= List of Cypriots =

The following is a list of Cypriots notable enough to have their own article. They are sorted by field, then by surname (both in alphabetical order).

== Academics and scientists ==
- Demis Hassabis (born 1976), Computer Scientist. Chief Executive Officer and co-founder of DeepMind
- Kyriacos A. Athanasiou (born 1960), biomedical engineer
- Mehmet Aziz (1893–1991), medical doctor credited with eradicating malaria in Cyprus
- Ulus Baker (1960–2007), sociologist
- Niyazi Berkes (1908–1988), sociologist
- Gülsen Bozkurt (born 1950), haematologist
- Mustafa Camgöz (born 1952), professor of cancer biology at Imperial College London
- Mehmet Çakıcı (born 1966), psychiatrist
- Anastasios Christodoulou (1932–2002), foundation secretary of the Open University
- Andreas Demetriou (born 1950), developmental psychologist and former Minister of Education and Culture of Cyprus
- Eleftherios Diamandis (born 1952), professor of clinical biochemistry at the University of Toronto
- Georgios P. Georgiou (born 1987), academic, linguist
- Nicos Kartakoullis (born 1967), professor at the University of Nicosia
- Niyazi Kızılyürek (born 1959), political scientist and MEP
- Kyriacos C. Markides (born 1942), professor of sociology and author
- Kypros Nicolaides (born 1953), obstetrician
- Kyriacos Costa Nicolaou (born 1946), chemist
- C. L. Max Nikias (born 1952), president of the University of Southern California in Los Angeles
- Andreas G. Orphanides (born 1955), Professor and former Rector European University Cyprus
- Athanasios Orphanides (born 1962), economist
- Kamil Özerk (born 1954), pedagogue
- Panikos Panayi (born 1962), professor, academic, historian and author De Montfort University
- Irena Papadopoulos, head of transcultural studies in health at Middlesex University
- Costas N. Papanicolas (born 1950), nuclear physicist and former president of The Cyprus Institute
- Christopher A. Pissarides (born 1948), economist, Nobel Prize laureate
- Andreas Pitsillides (born 1977), theologian
- Sophocles Sophocleous, art historian
- Symeon C. Symeonides (born 1949), dean of the Willamette University College of Law
- Chris Toumazou (born 1961), electronic engineer and Regius Professor of engineering at Imperial College London
- Andrekos Varnava (born 1979), professor, academic, historian and author Flinders University
- Marius Vassiliou (born 1957), computational physicist and research executive
- Vamık Volkan (born 1932), psychiatrist and author
- Panayiotis Zavos (born 1944), geneticist

== Actors ==
- Zeki Alasya, actor
- Angie Bowie, actress, personality
- Feri Cansel, erotic actress
- Jamie Demetriou, actor
- Natasia Demetriou, actress, What We Do in the Shadows, Stath Lets Flats
- Hazar Ergüçlü, actress, The Wild Pear Tree, Medcezir
- Evan Evagora, actor, Star Trek: Picard
- Dimitri Leonidas, actor, Sinbad, Tormented
- Georgina Leonidas, actress, The Basil Brush Show, Harry Potter and the Half-Blood Prince, Harry Potter and the Deathly Hallows – Part 2
- Stephanie Leonidas, actress, Defiance, Atlantis: End of a World, Birth of a Legend
- Rolandos Liatsos, actor
- Sotiris Moustakas, comedy actor
- Ada Nicodemou, actress, Home and Away
- Hannah Simone, actress
- Marina Sirtis, actress, Star Trek
- Hal Ozsan, actor, Dawson's Creek, Kyle XY
- Peter Polycarpou, actor

== Business ==
- John Christodoulou, property developer
- Suat Günsel, billionaire
- Stelios Haji-Ioannou, entrepreneur, owner of EasyGroup
- Dakis Joannou, J&P
- Lycourgos Kyprianou, former chairman of GlobalSoft and AremisSoft Corp
- Anastasios George Leventis, founder and owner of Leventis Group
- Asil Nadir, former chief executive of Polly Peck
- Theo Paphitis, entrepreneur and former chairman of Millwall Football Club
- George Paraskevaides, philanthropist and businessman
- Panos Panay, entrepreneur, executive and president of The Recording Academy
- Roys Poyiadjis, former co-chief executive officer of AremisSoft
- Reo Stakis, hotel and casino owner
- Andreas Panayiotou, businessman and property developer

== Film ==
- Michael Cacoyannis, filmmaker
- Panicos Chrysanthou, filmmaker and documentarian
- Derviş Zaim, novelist and filmmaker
- Haris Zambarloukos, cinematographer

== Historical figures ==
- Acesas (around 5th century BC), ancient artist, famed weaver
- Andromachus of Cyprus, admiral of Alexander the Great
- Aristocyprus, King of Soli
- Grigoris Afxentiou, member of EOKA
- Altheides, philosopher
- St Barnabas (1st century), apostolic father, early missionary
- Caterina Cornaro, Queen of Cyprus
- Charlotte, Queen of Cyprus
- Clearchus of Soli (4th-3rd century BC), Cyprus-born Greek philosopher of the Peripatetic school
- Evagoras, king of Salamis (410-374 BC)
- Henry I of Cyprus, King of Cyprus
- Hugh I of Cyprus, King of Cyprus
- Hugh II of Cyprus, King of Cyprus
- Hugh III of Cyprus, King of Cyprus
- Hugh IV of Cyprus, King of Cyprus
- James I of Cyprus, King of Cyprus
- James II of Cyprus, King of Cyprus
- James III of Cyprus, King of Cyprus
- Janus, King of Cyprus
- John II of Cyprus, King of Cyprus
- Michalis Karaolis, member of EOKA
- Stephen of Lusignan, writer
- Leontios Makhairas, historian
- Kyriakos Matsis, member of EOKA
- Nicocreon of Cyprus, (4th century BC-before 306 BC), king of Salamis
- Evagoras Pallikarides, member of EOKA
- Abu Bekr Pasha, Ottoman statesman
- Kıbrıslı Mehmed Emin Pasha, Grand Vizier
- Kıbrıslı Mehmed Kamil Pasha (born 1883), Grand Vizier
- Persaeus of Citium (306-243 BC), Stoic philosopher
- Peter I of Cyprus, King of Cyprus
- Peter II of Cyprus, King of Cyprus
- Ptolemy of Cyprus, king of Cyprus
- Sergius Paulus (1st century), proconsul of Cyprus
- Stasanor (lived 4th century BC), Cyprus-born Greek officer of Alexander the Great, later satrap of Drangiana, Bactria, and Sogdiana
- Stasinus (~7th century BC), one of the first European poets, a semi-legendary early Greek poet, author of the epic poem "Cypria", related to the Trojan War
- Theodora (around 500–548), empress of Byzantine empire (527–548)
- Zeno of Citium (333-264 BC), Cyprus-born Greek philosopher, founder of Stoicism

== Jurists ==
- Alecos Markides
- Solon Nikitas (1937–2005), judge and jurist, Supreme Court (1988–2003), Attorney-General (2003–2005)

== Musicians ==
- Ivi Adamou, singer (The X Factor), represented Cyprus in the 2012 Eurovision Song Contest
- Peter Andre, singer
- Marlain Angelides, singer
- Lisa Andreas, singer
- Aris Antoniades, composer
- Nil Burak, singer
- Constantinos Christoforou, singer
- Kemal Cetinay, singer and TV personality
- Tulisa Contostavlos, British-Cypriot singer
- Hovig Demirjian, singer
- Diam's, singer, rapper
- Nicolas Economou, composer
- Eleftheria Eleftheriou, singer (The X Factor), represents Greece in the 2012 Eurovision Song Contest
- Elpida, represented Cyprus in the 1986 Eurovision Song Contest
- Theo Evan, singer
- Barry Evangeli, music producer
- Evridiki, singer
- Michalis Hatzigiannis, singer
- Savvas Houvartas, guitarist, songwriter
- Alkinoos Ioannidis, singer
- George Kallis, composer
- Fikri Karayel, singer-songwriter
- Mick Karn, musician from the rock band Japan
- Yannis Kyriakides, composer
- Andreas G. Orphanides, composer
- Cyprien Katsaris, pianist
- Maria Elena Kyriakou, singer, winner of the first season of The Voice of Greece
- Stavros Konstantinou, singer
- Andrew Lambrou, singer, represented Cyprus in the 2023 Eurovision Song Contest
- Nikolas Metaxas, singer
- George Michael, singer
- Stavros Michalakakos, singer, winner of Greece's X-Factor II
- Despina Olympiou, singer, represented Cyprus in the 2013 Eurovision Song Contest
- Alex Panayi, singer-songwriter
- Aristos Petrou, rapper
- Mariada Pieridi, singer
- Nikki Ponte, singer (X-Factor)
- Ziynet Sali, singer
- Sarbel, singer
- Savvas Savva, composer, pianist
- Cat Stevens, singer-songwriter and multi-instrumentalist
- Rüya Taner, pianist
- Georges Theofanous, composer
- Martino Tirimo, pianist
- Marios Tokas, singer, composer
- Okan Ersan, guitarist
- Michalis Violaris, singer, composer
- Anna Vissi, singer
- Lia Vissi, singer
- Loukas Yorkas, singer, The X Factor winner 2009, represents Greece in the 2011 Eurovision Song Contest

== Mythical figures ==
- Anaxarete, legendary Cypriot maiden in Greek mythology
- Iphis see Anaxarete
- Aphrodite, Goddess of Love
- Pygmalion, legendary king of Cyprus in Greek mythology

== Political figures ==
- Adamos Adamou, MEP
- Mustafa Akıncı, President of Northern Cyprus (2015–present)
- Nicos Anastasiades, President of the Republic of Cyprus (2013–2023)
- Praxoula Antoniadou, Acting President of the United Democrats
- Mustafa Çağatay, Prime Minister of Northern Cyprus (1978–1983)
- Reşat Çağlar, diplomat
- Dimitris Christofias, former president of Cyprus (2008–2013)
- Kypros Chrysostomides, politician
- Katherine Clerides, former politician, peace activist
- Panayiotis Demetriou, MEP
- Rauf Denktaş, first president of Northern Cyprus
- Derviş Eroğlu, long-time prime minister and president of Northern Cyprus (2010–2015)
- Kutlay Erk, the former mayor of the Nicosia Turkish Municipality
- Alexis Galanos, Mayor of Famagusta and former president of the House of Representatives
- Marios Garoyian, President of the House of Representatives
- Polycarpos Georgadjis, politician and member of EOKA
- Takis Hadjigeorgiou, MEP
- Mehmet Harmancı, mayor of North Nicosia
- Georgios Iacovou, politician
- Androulla Kaminara (born 1957), European official and EU ambassador
- Ioannis Kasoulidis, MEP
- Vasiliki Kassianidou, archaeologist and politician
- Petros Kestoras, diplomat
- Glafkos Klerides, President of the Republic of Cyprus (1993–2003)
- Giannos Kranidiotis, politician
- Fazıl Küçük, first Turkish Cypriot vice president of the Republic of Cyprus
- Markos Kyprianou, former Minister of Foreign Affairs, formerly Finance Minister and former European Commissioner for Health
- Spyros Kyprianou, president (1977–1988)
- Georgios Ladas, former president of the House of Representatives
- Frances Lanitou, diplomat
- Yiorgos Lillikas, politician
- Vassos Lyssarides, founder of EDEK and former president of the House of Representatives
- Averof Neofytou, leader of DISY (2013–present)
- Makarios III, archbishop, president (1960–1977)
- Niyazi Manyera, medical doctor, politician and the first Minister of Health of the Republic of Cyprus
- Marios Matsakis, former MEP
- Yiannakis Matsis, former MEP
- Eleni Mavrou, former mayor of Nicosia (2006–2011)
- Alekos Michaelides, former Foreign Minister and President of the House of Representatives
- Andreas Moleskis, senior civil servant
- Özkan Murat, politician
- Osman Örek, Prime Minister of Northern Cyprus (1978)
- Kudret Özersay, politician, first leader of #Toparlanıyoruz Movement and founder of Halkın Partisi
- Hüseyin Özgürgün, Prime Minister of Northern Cyprus
- Canan Öztoprak, politician
- Leonidas Pantelides, former Ambassador of Cyprus to Russia
- Tassos Papadopoulos, president (2003–2008)
- Ezekias Papaioannou, Secretary General of AKEL (1949–1988)
- Michalis Papapetrou, politician and diplomat
- Nikos Sampson, de facto president of the Cyprus Republic after the 1974 coup d'état
- Benon Sevan, ex-head of UN Oil for Food program
- Ploutis Servas, first Secretary General of AKEL
- Ferdi Sabit Soyer, politician
- Sibel Siber, first female prime minister of Northern Cyprus
- Kostas Themistocleous, politician
- Kyriacos Triantaphyllides, MEP
- Alparslan Türkeş, leading Turkish politician
- Salih Usar, Minister of Public Works and Communications
- Eşref Vaiz, politician
- Androulla Vasiliou, European Commissioner for Education, Culture, Multilingualism and Youth
- George Vasiliou, president and founder of Cypriot United Democrats party (1988–1993)

== Religious figures ==
- Arkadios II, Archbishop (630s–643)
- Archbishop Chrysostomos I of Cyprus, Archbishop (1977–2006)
- Archbishop Chrysostomos II of Cyprus, Archbishop (2006–)
- Barnabas, prominent early Christian disciple. He is traditionally identified as the founder of the Cypriot Orthodox Church. The feast day of Barnabas is celebrated on June 11.
- Epiphanius of Salamis, Metropolitan of Cyprus (367–403)
- Gregory II (1241–1290), Patriarch of Constantinople (1283–1289)
- John the Merciful (7th century), Patriarch of Alexandria
- Kyprianos, Archbishop (1810–1821)
- Kyrillos II, Archbishop (1909–1916)
- Kyrillos III, Archbishop (1916–1933)
- Leontios of Neapolis (7th century), Bishop of Neapolis and writer
- Lazarus of Bethany, ordained by Paul and Barnabas as the first Bishop of Kition following his resurrection
- Makarios I, Archbishop of Cyprus (1854–1865)
- Makarios II, Archbishop (1947–1950)
- Makarios III, Archbishop, president (1960–1977)
- Nazim al-Qubrusi, leader of the Naqshbandi-Haqqani Sufi Order
- Peter VII (1949–2004), Pope and Patriarch of Alexandria and All Africa (1997–2004)
- Saint Spyridon (ca. 270–348)

== Sports ==
- Georgios Achilleos, world champion skeet shooter
- Mete Adanır, footballer
- Efstathios Aloneftis, football player with APOEL F.C./Cyprus national football team
- Anastasios Andreou, 1896 Olympian
- Antonakis Andreou, skeet shooter
- Eleni Artymata, track and field
- Marcos Baghdatis, tennis player
- Demetri Catrakilis, rugby player for Harlequins
- Constantinos Charalambidis, football player with Apoel Nicosia
- Dimitris Christofi, football player with Omonoia Nicosia
- Christodoulos Christodoulides, judoka
- Andrew Demetriou, Australian rules football player, CEO of the Australian Football League (AFL)
- Chris Dicomidis, rugby player for the Cypriot national rugby team
- Andri Eleftheriou, skeet shooter
- Tio Ellinas, race car driver
- Marios Georgiou, Olympic gymnast
- Savva Georgiou, football player
- Marios Hadjiandreou, triple jumper
- Oscar Heidenstam, bodybuilding champion
- Lazaros Iakovou, football player
- Andreas Ioannides, football player
- Kyriakos Ioannou, track and field
- Sotiris Kaiafas, former football player with Omonoia Nicosia and Golden Boot winner
- Prodromos Katsantonis, sprinter
- Michalis Konstantinou, football player with Omonoia Nicosia
- Pavlos Kontides, sailor and first Cypriot Olympic medalist
- Anthony Koutoufides, Australian rules footballer
- Stylianos Kyriakides, marathon runner
- Tom Loizides, Cypriot national rugby team
- Anninos Marcoullides, sprinter
- Elena Mousikou, archer
- Yılmaz Orhan, football player
- Ramona Papaioannou, sprinter
- Karolina Pelendritou, swimmer and Paralympic gold medalist
- Dimitri Petrides, Latin American dance pioneer
- Costas Philippou, UFC fighter/ Boxer
- Meliz Redif, athlete
- Panagiotis Sierepeklis, volleyball player
- Andreas Sofokleous, footballer
- Andreas Tsiatinis, basketball player
- Milan Trajkovic, hurdler
- Chrystalleni Trikomiti, rhythmic gymnast
- Garo Yepremian, former place kicker for the Miami Dolphins

== Writers ==
- Kutlu Adali, journalist
- Anthony Anaxagorou, poet
- Ulus Baker, non-fiction writer
- Urkiye Mine Balman, poet
- Neriman Cahit, poet and author
- Kyriakos Charalambides, poet
- Demetris Th. Gotsis, poet and writer
- Christy Lefteri, novelist
- Dimitris Lipertis, poet
- Peter Lyssiotis, writer
- Niki Marangou, writer
- Pembe Marmara, poet
- Alex Michaelides, writer
- Vasilis Michaelides, poet
- Costas Montis, poet
- Kaytazzade Mehmet Nazım, poet
- Nicos Nicolaides, writer and painter
- Michael Paraskos, novelist and art critic
- George Philippou Pierides, writer
- Michael Theodoulou, journalist
- Osman Türkay, poet and Nobel Prize for Literature nominee
- Sevgül Uludağ, journalist
- Mehmet Yaşın, poet
- Neşe Yaşın, poet
- Özker Yaşın, poet

== See also ==
- Culture of Cyprus
- Demographics of Cyprus
