= Cypriot literature =

Cypriot literature (Greek: Κυπριακή λογοτεχνία, romanized: Kypriakí logotechnía, Turkish: Kıbrıs edebiyatı) covers literature from Cyprus found mainly in Greek, Turkish, English and/or other languages, including French. The modern Cypriot Greek dialect belongs to the Southeastern group of Modern Greek dialects.

== Ancient / Medieval ==
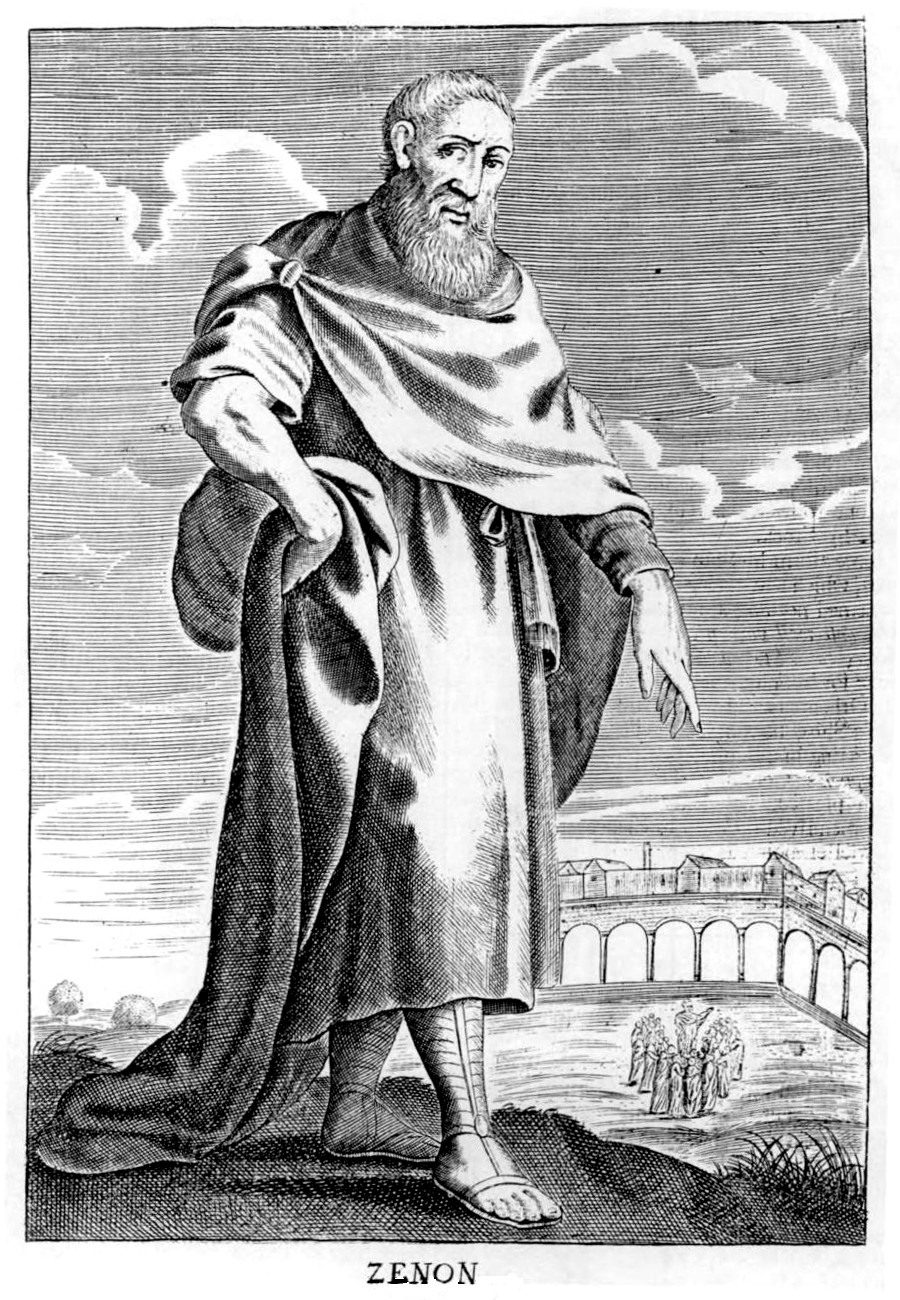
Zeno of Citium, a significant figure in early Cypriot literature

Literary production from antiquity includes the Cypria, an epic poem, probably composed in the late 7th century BC and attributed to Stasinus. The Cypriot Zeno of Citium was the founder of the Stoic School of Philosophy, followed by his friend and disciple Persaeus.

Cyprus also figures in early Christian literature such as the Acts of the Apostles according to which the Apostles Barnabas and Paul preached on the island. Byzantine/medieval Cypriot writers include Leontios of Neapolis, Altheides and Patriarch Gregory II of Constantinople. Byzantine Epic poetry, notably the "acritic songs", flourished during the Middle Ages.

== Late Middle Ages and the Renaissance ==
The legislation of the Kingdom of Cyprus in the Middle Ages, known as the Assizes of Jerusalem, was written in the local dialect of the time, as well as in French. The Assizes were translated into Italian by 1531 and remain the largest collection of surviving medieval laws.

As far as historiography is concerned, the most important medieval works are the chronicles of Leontios Makhairas and Georgios Boustronios, covering the period under Frankish rule (1191–1489), written in the local dialect with many French influences.

The Cypriot Canzoniere is a great collection of sonnets in the manner of Francesco Petrarca and of Poèmes d'amour written in medieval Greek Cypriot that dates to the 16th century, when Cyprus was a possession of the Republic of Venice. Some of them are actual translations of poems written by Petrarch, Bembo, Ariosto and Sannazzaro. The majority of the play Othello by William Shakespeare is set on Venetian Cyprus.

== Modern ==
A comprehensive study on modern literary figures from Cyprus writing in Greek, Turkish and English can be found in Bahriye Kemal's book Writing Cyprus: Postcolonial and Partitioned Literatures of Place and Space (Routledge, 2020).

Modern literary figures from Cyprus writing in Greek include the poet and writer Kostas Montis, poet Kyriakos Charalambides, novelist Panos Ioannides, poet Michalis Pasiardis, poet/translator Stephanos Stephanides, writer Nicos Nicolaides, horror writer Fivos Kyprianou, Stylianos Atteshlis, Loukis Akritas and Demetris Th. Gotsis. Dimitris Lipertis, Vasilis Michaelides and Pavlos Liasides are folk poets who wrote poems mainly in the Cypriot-Greek dialect. The local dialect has been traditionally used for folk songs and poetry, including τσιαττιστά (battle poetry, a form of Playing the dozens) and the tradition of ποιητάρηες (bards).

Modern literary figures from Cyprus writing in Turkish include poets Osman Türkay, Özker Yaşın, Neşe Yaşın, Neriman Cahit and Mehmet Yaşın. Neşe Yaşın is a well known Cypriot Turkish poet and author, who mainly writes in Turkish although a considerable number of her works of prose have been translated into Greek and English. In 2002 her novel Secret History of Sad Girls was banned in the TRNC and Turkey and she received multiple threats from Turkish nationalists. Sevgül Uludağ is an investigative reporter who besides being instrumental in uncovering information on thousands of missing Cypriots she has also authored a number of books. Urkiye Mine Balman has written in a wide variety genres, but her works are mostly romantic poems describing sometimes a lonesome village girl or country life and long-distance romances. Balman has published her works in Yesilada, Türk Dili, and Türk'e Dogru literary magazines in Turkey.

Cyprus-based writers in other languages includes the Armenian Cypriot poet Nora Nadjarian. There is also an increasingly strong presence of both temporary and permanent emigre Cypriot writers in world literature, as well as writings by second and third -generation Cypriot writers born or raised abroad, often writing in English. This includes writers such as Christy Lefteri, Michael Paraskos, Stel Pavlou, and Stephanos Stephanides.

== Other ==
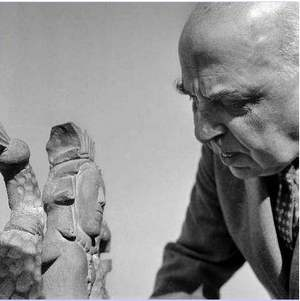
Giorgos Seferis is one of the most important Greek poets. He was awarded the Nobel Prize for Literature in 1963. He worked in the diplomatic corps and was posted to Cyprus where he wrote some of his most important work.

Cyprus has also been a place of inspiration and literary production for non-native authors during the twentieth century.

Lawrence Durrell lived in Cyprus from 1952 until 26 August 1956 and wrote the book Bitter Lemons concerning his time there, which earned him the second Duff Cooper Prize in 1957.

Nobel laureate Giorgos Seferis, from Greece was heavily influenced by Cyprus. He wrote one of his most famous works (Log Book III – initially entitled Cyprus, where it was ordained for me…) while working for the Greek diplomatic mission on the island. British novelist Paul Stewart was previously based in Cyprus, and the island was the location for Victoria Hislop's 2015 novel The Sunrise.

== See also ==
- Culture of Cyprus
- Music of Cyprus
