= Filippou =

Filippou – also Philippou or Phillipou – is a Greek surname. Notable people with the surname include:

- Alexander Filippou (born 1958), Greek-German chemistry scholar
- Costas Philippou (born 1979), Greek-Cypriot-American mixed martial artist
- Danny and Michael Philippou, creators of Australian YouTube channel RackaRacka
- Efthymis Filippou (born 1977), Greek screenwriter
- Filippos Filippou (disambiguation)
- Ioánna Filíppou (born 1995), Cypriot beauty pageant competitor
- Mattaes Phillipou (born 2004), Australian rules footballer
- Michalis Filippou (born 1951), Greek football manager
- Nikos Filippou (born 1962), Greek basketballer
- Sam Phillipou (born 1974), Australian rules footballer
- Members of the Australian band Universal who are brothers:
  - George Philippou
  - Michael Philippou
  - Adam Philippou

== See also ==
- George Philippou Pierides (1904–1999), Cypriot writer
