= Kypria =

Kypria may refer to:

- Cypria (AKA Kypria), an epic poem of ancient Greek literature
- Kypria festival, an annual international festival in Cyprus
