= Rita Theodorou Superman =

Cypriot politician (born 1966)

- Ρίτα Θεοδώρου Σούπερμαν
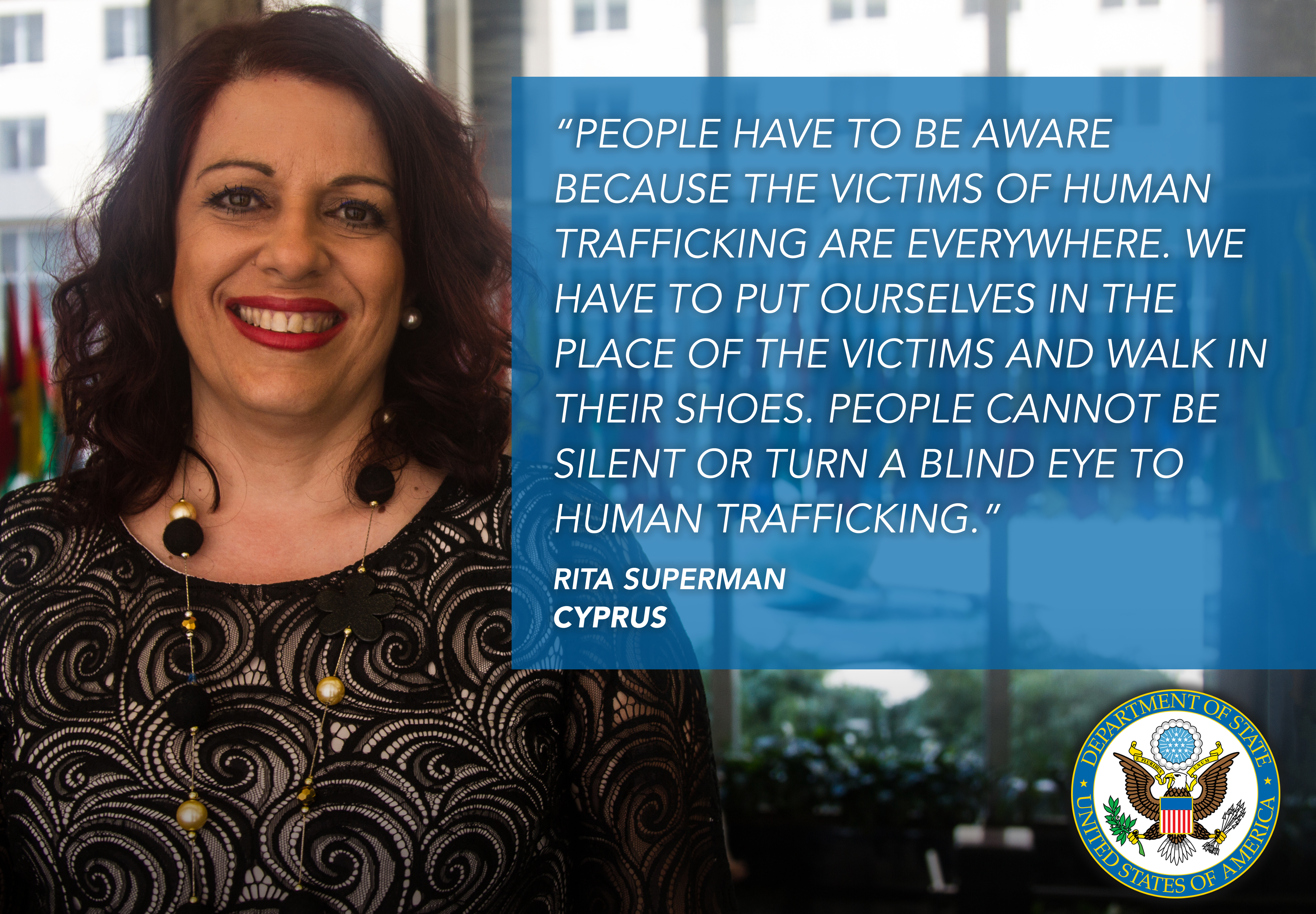
- Theodorou in 2026

Member of the House of Representatives of Cyprus
- Incumbent
- Assumed office 31 May 2021
- Constituency: Kyrenia District

Personal details
- Born: 23 December 1966 (age 59) Kyrenia, Northern Cyprus
- Party: DISY
- Education: Cyprus College, CDA College, University of Nicosia
- Occupation: Police officer, politician

Rita Theodorou Superman (Greek: Ρίτα Θεοδώρου Σούπερμαν; born 23 December 1966) is a Cypriot police officer and politician. She was elected to the House of Representatives in the 2021 legislative election, representing the Kyrenia constituency for the Democratic Rally (DISY).

== Early life and career ==
Theodorou Superman was born in Kyrenia, Cyprus. She graduated from the Cyprus Police Academy and obtained a diploma in business administration from Cyprus College. She later received a bachelor's degree in business administration from CDA College and a master's degree in criminology from the University of Nicosia.

Prior to her election, Theodorou Superman worked as a police officer. She served as head of the anti-trafficking department of the Cyprus Police.

== Political career ==
Theodorou Superman was elected to the House of Representatives in the 2021 legislative election, becoming one of two DISY members to represent the Kyrenia constituency, and one of eight women in parliament. She assumed office on 31 May 2021.

During her tenure, she has served as a member of the House Standing Committee on Development Plans and Public Expenditure Control, the Committee on Refugees-Enclaved-Missing-Adversely Affected Persons, the Committee on the Environment, and the Committee on Human Rights and Equal Opportunities for Men and Women. She has also been a member of the Cypriot delegation to the Parliamentary Assembly of the Mediterranean (PAM) and served as special rapporteur of PAM on combatting terrorism and organized crime.

On 6 December 2024, Theodorou Superman assumed the presidency of the Parliamentary Assembly Coordinating Mechanism of the United Nations Office for Counter Terrorism (UNOCT). In January 2026, she accused the Cypriot government of "hiding the issue of human trafficking under the carpet" following a report into the exploitaiton of women in Ayia Napa.

== Awards and honours ==
In 2016, Theodorou Superman was named a Trafficking in Persons Report Hero by the United States Department of State.

== Personal life ==
Theodorou Superman is married to George Superman; she has two daughters and one son.
