= Kyprianou =

Kyprianou (Greek: Κυπριανού) is a Greek-language surname that may refer to the following notable people:

- Andreas Kyprianou (born 1988), Cypriot football striker
- Andros Kyprianou (born 1955), Greek Cypriot politician, General Secretary of AKEL
- Hector Kyprianou (born 2001), English-born Cypriot footballer
- Lycourgos Kyprianou, Cypriot businessman, former chairman of GlobalSoft and AremisSoft Corp
- Markos Kyprianou (born 1960), Cypriot politician, Minister of Foreign Affairs until 2011
- Spyros Kyprianou (1932–2002), Cypriot politician, 2nd President of the Republic of Cyprus from 1977 to 1988

== See also ==
- Spyros Kyprianou Athletic Center, Cyprus
- Spyrou Kyprianou Avenue, Nicosia, Cyprus
