= Accreditation Institution =

The Danish Accreditation Institution

Agency overview
- Formed: September 1, 2007
- Type: School accreditation
- Headquarters: Denmark
- Parent agency: Ministry of Science, Innovation, and Higher Education
- Child agency: ACE Denmark
- Website: akkr.dk

The Danish Accreditation Institution was established by Danish law as an independent institution in 2007. The institution consists of two entities; the Accreditation Council, which serves as the decision-making authority, and Accreditation Institution, which serves as the accreditation operator. The Council makes decisions on the accreditation of all higher education study programmes in Denmark, both new and existing.

== The Accreditation Council ==
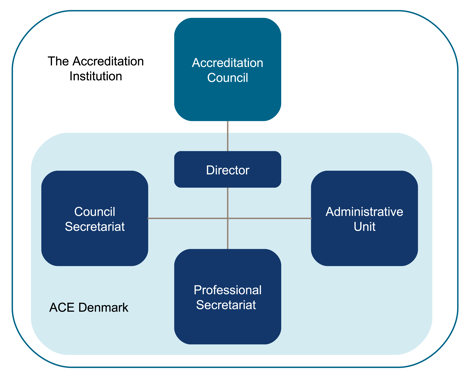

As the decision-making authority, the Council is an independent unit in the Accreditation Institution. The chairman and members of the Council must between them possess knowledge and experience on quality assurance, higher education, research and labour market conditions for graduates.

The decisions of the Accreditation Council fall under the auspices of the following ministries:

- Ministry of Science, Innovation, and Higher Education
- Ministry of Culture (Denmark)

The Council has nine members. At least one member must have international experience and one must be a student. Women and men are equally represented. The Council's decisions are made public in Danish on www.akkr.dk.

== Operators ==
The Council's decisions are based on recommendations from the two accreditation operators, the Accreditation Institution and EVA.

=== Accreditation Institution ===
The Accreditation Institution is the accreditation operator for bachelor, master's and professional master's programmes. The Accreditation Institution is an independent government institution made up of three secretariats and a management team.

The Professional Secretariat facilitates the accreditation of all Danish university study programmes. This involves preparation of a rotation plan for the study programmes, setting-up and preparation of expert panels to assess the study programmes, organising university visits and authoring the concluding reports.

The Council Secretariat prepares the Council's meetings and facilitates its contact and dialogue with stakeholders in different areas. These include the operators ACE Denmark and EVA as well as professional organisations, universities, student organisations, public authorities and the political environment, e.g., in the Danish Parliament.

The Administrative Unit reports to the director and undertakes assignments relating to communication, law, finance and general service functions.

=== EVA ===
EVA is the accreditation operator of professional bachelor, academy profession and diploma programmes as well as the specialisation courses (adult education and continuing training). In addition, EVA undertakes evaluations, development activities and studies of early childhood education, primary and lower secondary education, upper secondary education, higher education and adult education.

== Accreditation method ==
The accreditation method involves a direct assessment of whether a study programme or an institution meets a number of predefined quality criteria. Accreditation is characterised by resulting in an authoritative approval/non-approval of a study programme or an institution. As a further result of the authoritative approval, the subject may obtain special rights such as the right to offer new study programmes and degrees.

=== Quality and relevance criteria ===
Danish accreditation involves both existing study programmes and new study programmes which must be accredited before they may be set up.

In Denmark, the quality and relevance of a study programme are assessed on the basis of five predefined criteria.

1. Demand for the study programme in the labour market
2. The study programme is based on research and connected with an active research environment of high quality
3. Academic profile of the study programme and learning outcome targets
4. Structure and organisation of the study programme
5. Continuous internal quality assurance of the study programme

Accreditation may result in three different decisions:

- Positive accreditation: The study programme is approved for up to six years.
- Conditional positive accreditation: The study programme is given one to two years to rectify shortcomings. (New study programmes cannot receive conditional positive accreditation – only approval or refusal).
- Refusal: The study programme is closed. The minister must prepare a plan for how the students can complete their education.

== International standards ==
The accreditation method is based on the European standards and guidelines for quality assurance, the so-called ESGs. The ESGs were approved at the Bologna Ministerial Meeting in 2005 in Bergen, which set up a separate focus on professionalisation of quality assurance within higher education. The standards contain requirements for the universities, for external quality assurance and for external quality assurance institutions such as the Accreditation Institution and EVA. The Accreditation Institution and EVA are both members of ENQA, the European Association of Quality Assurance Agencies. The Accreditation Institution has also been included in the European Register for Quality Assurance Agencies, EQAR.
