= Özker =

Özker is both a masculine Turkish given name and a surname. Notable people with the name include:

Given name:

- Özker Özgür, Turkish-Cypriot politician
- Ozker Yasin, Turkish poet

Surname:

- Eren Ozker, American puppeteer
