= Charalambides (surname) =

Charalambides (also spelled Charalambidis or Charalampidis) is a Greek surname. It may refer to:

- Constantinos Charalambidis (born 1981), Cypriot footballer
- Efterpi Charalambidis, Venezuelan film director
- Kostas Charalampidis (born 1976), Greek basketball player
- Kyriakos Charalambides (born 1940), Greek poet and translator
- Stephanos of Tallinn (born as Christakis Charalambides, 1940), Estonian Orthodox Church primate

Nora Charles in Dashiel Hammett's 1934 book The Thin Man teasingly calls her detective husband, Nick Charles, "Mr. Charalambides," referencing Nick's earlier explanation that "Charles" is not Greek-sounding because "the Old Man" (either his father or grandfather) acquiesced to changing it upon immigrating to America.
