= Özker Yaşın =

Turkish Cypriot poet, author and journalist

- Born: 1932; Nicosia, British Cyprus
- Died: 6 February 2011 (aged 78–79); Istanbul, Turkey
- Resting place: North Nicosia, Northern Cyprus
- Occupations: Poet, Author, Journalist
- Children: Neşe Yaşın; Mehmet Yaşın
- Writing career
- Language: Turkish

Özker Yaşın (1932–2011) was a Turkish Cypriot poet, author and journalist. He is considered to be one of the leading Turkish Cypriot poets of the period starting from the 1950s, and his work often exhibited a nationalistic line of thought.

== Biography ==
Yaşın was born in 1932 in the Cypriot capital of Nicosia. His family had originated from the village of Peristerona. He received his primary and secondary education in Istanbul, in the 18th Primary School and the Vefa High School. His first poem in a newspaper was published in 1946, and the first one in a journal was published when he was 17 in journal Yeşilada.

In 1950, he returned to Cyprus as a journalist. In 1952, his first poem in the renowned Turkish journal Varlık was published. Upon his return, he became a very prolific poet who brought "a different outlook" to Turkish Cypriot poetry. He published books called Bayraktar Destanı ("the Epic of the Flag Bearer"), Kıbrıs'tan Atatürk'e (From Cyprus to Atatürk), Namık Kemal Kıbrıs'ta ("Namık Kemal in Cyprus") and Atatürk'e Saygı Duruşu ("Standing in Silence for Atatürk"). In 1963, when the intercommunal violence called "Bloody Christmas" erupted, he joined the Turkish Cypriot armed struggle with Turkish Resistance Organization fighters and started working for the newly established Turkish Cyprus Bayrak radio. He wrote poems in the front line and read them on Bayrak, these poems were later compiled into two books, Kanlı Kıbrıs ("Bloody Cyprus"), telling the story of the events of 21–25 December 1963, and Oğlum Savaş'a Mektuplar ("Letters to War, My Son"), telling the story of the events of 25 December 1963 – 7 March 1964. He was arrested by the Greek Cypriot police in the Nicosia International Airport due to the poems he read on the radio and was imprisoned for some time. He also wrote satire under the alias "Terzioğlu".

He was elected a member of the Turkish Cypriot Communal Assembly on 5 July 1970 from Nicosia and was one of the founding members of the Republican Turkish Party. He was a member of the Committee of Social Works of the Turkish Cypriot Administration. He continued politics and owned a shop in the 1980s, when he quit due to his deteriorating health and moved to a house that formerly belonged to his mother in Fatih, Istanbul with his wife.

In 1964, he was displaced as a result of the intercommunal violence with his family and had to live in an overcrowded house. Between 1967 and 1973, he published the newspaper Savaş.

Yaşın married three times. His first two marriages ended in divorce and he married his last wife, Nimet Yaşın, on 9 February 1983. He had five children, two of whom, Neşe and Mehmet Yaşın, went on to become important poets in Turkish Cypriot literature.

He spent his final working years writing his three-volume work, Nevzat ve Ben ("Nevzat and I"). He refused to use any other method for writing other than writing by hand. He suffered from various diseases including diabetes in his last years, and lost his vision two and a half years before his death. He died on 6 February 2011 and was buried in Nicosia. The decision to bury him Nicosia was made by his wife, with his daughter Neşe, and was inspired by his line "One day, I will die and be buried in Cyprus, and daisies will grow on my grave".

== Themes and influences ==
Thematically, his works have focused on Cyprus, however, he was also influenced by the city of Istanbul, where he spent his childhood. He was called "one of the most important poets in Turkish Cypriot literature in original pursuits", but his work exhibits influence from various Turkish authors, such as Orhan Veli Kanık, Nazım Hikmet, Cahit Külebi, Ümit Yaşar Oğuzcan, Bedri Rahmi Eyuboğlu and "arguably" Behçet Kemal Çağlar.

Yaşın was part of the nationalist poetry movement at the time and wrote works depicting the intercommunal violence and the Turkish invasion of Cyprus. His ideological alignment always promoted peace instead of aggressive nationalism, however, when the Turkish Cypriots faced "aggressive attacks" after 1963, he became a symbolic advocate of national rights for Turkish Cypriots. However, he also reflected a change of focus from Turkey to Cyprus as the location of Turkish Cypriot identity. This can be seen in his words, "We Cypriots in the past were proud of our Turkishness and would say 'How happy is he who can call himself a Turk.' Now, however, we will feel pride both in being 'a Turk' and in being 'a Cypriot'. From now on we'll brag, 'How happy is he who can call himself a Turkish Cypriot'."

His nationalist line of thought combined his position as a Turkish Cypriot intellectual and the political environment of the 1960s and 70s. However, over time, his poetic approach turned to one that was increasingly imbued in "dispersion", according to Metin Turan.
