= Savvas Houvartas =

Cypriot musician

Savvas Houvartas, (Greek: Σάββας Χουβαρτάς; 1968 – 4 May 2013) was a Cypriot guitarist and songwriter. His compositions, are influenced by jazz or rock, and are instrumental or with Greek lyrics; overall are close to the Mediterranean music; improvisation is another characteristic of his music. Houvartas regularly performed his music at festivals and various venues. Among the festivals are the Etnofest World Culture Festival in Serbia, Kypria festival, the University of Cyprus Cultural Festival, and Pomos Paradise Jazz Festival. 'Erimos' a composition of Savvas has been included in the 2007 Europavox Festival compilation CD.

Houvartas died on 4 May 2013. A showcase event in the Rialto Theatre was dedicated to his memory in 2014.

== Discography ==
- 2010 'A minor JAM'
- 2007 Europavox Festival (France) Compilation CD - Composition 'Erimos' under World Music category
- 2007 'Acoustic'
