= Solon Nikitas =

Cypriot judge (1937–2005)

Solon Nikitas (October 1, 1937 – October 22, 2005) was a Cypriot judge and jurist. He served as a justice of the Supreme Court of Cyprus as well as attorney general.

== Early life and career ==
Nikitas was born and raised in Limassol, Cyprus. His family later moved to Famagusta, and he graduated from the Gymnasium of Famagusta with distinction, being awarded the Palamas Prize.

He briefly worked at the Board of Commerce, before going to England where he studied law and was called to the Bar (Lincoln's). In 1961, he began practicing law in Nicosia.

== Legal career ==
On 10 September 1971, Nikitas was appointed Judge of the District Court of Famagusta, subsequently serving at the District Court of Nicosia, beginning on 10 September 1973). On 10 October 1980, he was appointed Senior District Judge and on 1 January 1982, President of District Court, serving at the District Court of Nicosia. On 1 September 1987, he began serving at the District Court of Larnaca-Famagusta.

On 19 November 1988, Nikitas was appointed to the Supreme Court of Cyprus. He left the court on 30 April 2003 following his appointment as attorney-general of Cyprus. In May 2005, he resigned from his position as attorney-general in connection with a judgment of the Supreme Court, stating that the case was “inextricably interwoven with the very essence of the administration of justice, the principles of the rule of law and the democratic principle of the separation of powers. It is also related to the existence, the endurance and the quality of institutions in a free and democratic society”.

He was elected as a member of the council of the Commonwealth Magistrates and Judges Association (CMJA) in 1994 and as a Regional Vice-President for the North Atlantic and Mediterranean Region of the CMJA in 1997. As Regional Vice-President he organised the very successful follow-up conference on the Latimer House Principles in Larnaca in October 1988 on "The Role of the Judiciary in Developing and maintaining a vibrant human rights environment in the Commonwealth". He participated in many conferences all over the world and gave lectures and speeches on several legal subjects during his long and distinguished legal and judicial career. Inspired by intense democratic convictions, he was a founding and acting member of the Organisation for the Restoration of Democracy in Greece.

== See also ==
- List of Cypriots
- List of prominent jurists
