= Fotini Tsiridou =

Cypriot politician

- Φωτεινή Τσιρίδου

Member of the House of Representatives of Cyprus
- Incumbent
- Assumed office 1 June 2021
- Constituency: Limassol

Personal details
- Born: 17 December 1979 (age 46) Limassol, Cyprus
- Party: DISY
- Education: City St George's, University of London; University College London; Middle Temple
- Occupation: Lawyer, politician

Fotini Tsiridou (Greek: Φωτεινή Τσιρίδου; born 17 December 1979) is a Cypriot lawyer and politician. She was elected to the House of Representatives in the 2021 legislative election, representing the Limassol constituency as a member of the Democratic Rally (DISY).

== Early life and career ==
Tsiridou was born and raised in Limassol, Cyprus. She attended the Lyceum of Petrou kai Pavlou for her secondary education.

She obtained a Bachelor of Laws from City St George's, University of London and subsequently attended the Inns of Court School of Law, where she qualified as a barrister. She also holds a Master of Laws in maritime law from University College London. She is a member of the Middle Temple and the Chartered Institute of Arbitrators.

Tsiridou has been practicing law since 2003. From 2016 to 2018, she served as a member of the board of the Cyprus Ports Authority. In December 2018, she was appointed vice chair of the council of the Cyprus Stock Exchange; she remained in the role until 2021. She is a partner at the Limassol-based law firm Costas Tsirides & Co. LLC.

== Political career ==
In 2020, Tsiridou became a coordinator of the DISY policy production team. She was elected to the House of Representatives in the June 2021 legislative election, becoming one of three DISY MPs representing the Limassol constituency, and one of eight women in parliament. During her tenure, she has served as deputy chair of the House Standing Committee on Legal Affairs, Justice and Public Order. She has also served as a member of the House Standing Committees on Transport, Communications and Works; Labour, Welfare and Social Insurance; and Human Rights and Equal Opportunities for Men and Women.

In 2023, Tsiridou was a candidate for vice president of DISY; in May 2023, she was named deputy spokesperson of the party. In August 2025, DISY announced that she would seek re-election in the 2026 legislative election. In January 2026, she tabled a bill that would require digital citizenship and safe social media use to be included in all public and private school curricula.

== Personal life ==
Tsiridou is married to Alexandros Papadopoulos; she has one daughter and one son.
