= Andreas G. Orphanides =

Cypriot professor and university administrator

- Ανδρέας Γρ. Ορφανίδης
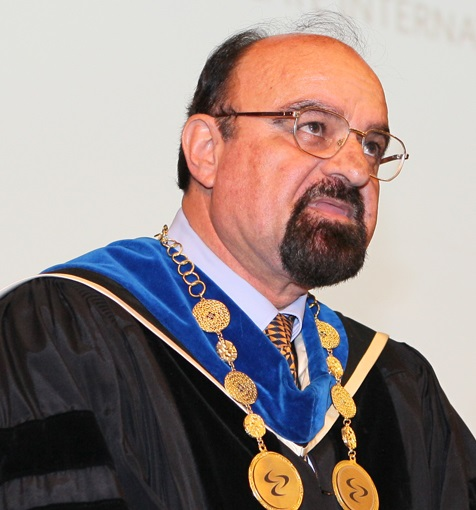
- Born: Lapithos, Cyprus
- Education: University of Athens; State University of New York at Albany
- Occupations: Professor, Philips University, Cyprus; Former Rector, European University Cyprus

Andreas G. Orphanides (Greek: Ανδρέας Γρ. Ορφανίδης) is a Cypriot professor and university administrator. He is Professor of History and Archaeology at Philips University in Cyprus, after serving as Professor of History, Archaeology and Anthropology at European University Cyprus, where he was formerly Rector. He is a past president of both the European Association of Institutions in Higher Education and the European Quality Assurance Register of Higher Education.

== Life and career ==
Andreas G. Orphanides was born in Lapithos, Cyprus. He received his undergraduate degree from the School of Philosophy at the University of Athens and pursued his graduate studies in Anthropology and Archeology at State University of New York at Albany. He received his master's degree in 1982 with a dissertation on Bronze Age anthropomorphic figurines in the Cesnola Collection at the Metropolitan Museum of Art, published the following year in Astrom Editions' Studies in Mediterranean Archaeology series. He received his PhD in 1986. His doctoral dissertation, Towards a theory for the interpretation of material remains in archaeology: the Bronze Age anthropomorphic figurines from Cyprus was a continuation of his master's degree research. He was Assistant Director of the Institute of Cypriot Studies at the State University of New York at Albany, as well as Assistant Director and pottery specialist of the University's archaeological expedition in Cyprus (1981-1986).

Orphanides later pursued further graduate studies in open and distance learning at Hellenic Open University. On his return to Cyprus, he taught History, Archaeology and Anthropology at Cyprus College, and eventually became Dean of Academic Affairs there. From 1988 to 2006 he was editor-in-chief of the college's Journal of Business and Society. When the college received university status and became European University Cyprus in 2007, he was elected and appointed Rector, a position he held until 2014, and thereafter he remained Professor of History, Archaeology and Anthropology.

Andreas G. Orphanides was Vice President of the European Association of Institutions in Higher Education from 2005 to 2011, and President from 2011 to 2015, and with these capacities he participated in various bodies of the Bologna Process, such as the BFUG, the E4 Group, and EQAR where he served as its President and Vice President. Recently (2015-2020), he was on the Council of the Cyprus Agency of Quality Assurance and Accreditation in Higher Education.

Orphanides is also a composer whose works have been performed in Europe and in the United States. He studied both Western classical music and Byzantine music at the National Conservatory and the Kyrenia Diocese School of Byzantine Music at Lapithos. His works include several symphonic and choral pieces, the anthems of the European University Cyprus and the Open University of Cyprus, and the string quartet 'Cyprus Zephyr' which won Second Prize at the 2017 Malta International Composition Competition.

== Books ==
Single-authored

- Andreas G. Orphanides, Bronze Age Anthropomorphic Figurines in the Cesnola Collection at the Metropolitan Museum of Art. SIMA, Pocket-Book 20, Gothenburg: Paul Astroms Forlag, 1983, 88 pages, 6 figures, 18 plates
- Andreas G. Orphanides, Radioanalytical Techniques in Archaeology: Pottery and Raw Clay Analysis. Nicosia: AGO Publications, 1985, 104 pages, 10 figures
- Andreas G. Orphanides, Towards a Theory for the Interpretation of Material Remains in Archaeology: The Bronze Age Anthropomorphic Figurines from Cyprus. Ph.D. Dissertation, State University of New York at Albany, 1986, 233 pages, 30 figures

Co-edited

- Andreas G. Orphanides and P. W. Wallace, Greek and Latin Texts to the Third Century A.D, SHC, Volume I, Nicosia: Institute of Cypriot Studies, University at Albany, and Cyprus College, 1990, 312 pages
- Andreas G. Orphanides and P. W. Wallace, Near Eastern and Aegean Texts from the Third to First Millennia B.C. (by A. Bernard Knapp), SHC, Volume II, Albany, NY: Greece and Cyprus Research Center, 1996, 92 pages
- Andreas G. Orphanides and P. W. Wallace, A Pilgrim's Account of Cyprus: Barsky's Travels in Cyprus (by A. D. Grishin), SHC, Volume III, Albany, NY: Greece and Cyprus Research Center, 1996, 114 pages, 18 plates
- Andreas G. Orphanides and P. W. Wallace, Pero Tafur and Cyprus (by C. I. Nepaulsingh), SHC, Volume IV, Albany, NY: Greece and Cyprus Research Center, 1997, 70 pages
- Andreas G. Orphanides and P. W. Wallace, English Texts: Frankish and Turkish Periods (by D. W. Martin), SHC, Volume V, Albany, NY: Greece and Cyprus Research Center, 1998, 336 pages
- Andreas G. Orphanides and P. W. Wallace English Texts: British Period to 1900 (by D. W. Martin), SHC, Volume VI, Albany, NY: Greece and Cyprus Research Center, 1999, 352 pages, 55 plates
- Andreas G. Orphanides and P. W. Wallace, Greek Texts of the Fourth to Thirteenth Centuries (by H. A. Pohlsander), SHC, Volume VII, Albany, NY: Greece and Cyprus Research Center, 1999, 217 pages
- Andreas G. Orphanides and P. W. Wallace, Latin Texts from the First Century B.C. to the Seventeenth Century A.D. (by L. Roberts), SHC, Volume VIII, Albany, NY: Greece and Cyprus Research Center, 2000, 272 pages
- Andreas G. Orphanides and P. W. Wallace, The Final Days of British Rule in Cyprus (by D. W. Martin et P. W. Wallace.), SHC, Volume IX, Albany, NY: Greece and Cyprus Research Center, 2000, 370 pages
- Andreas G. Orphanides and P. W. Wallace, Lusignan's Chronography and Brief General History of the Island of Cyprus A.D. 1573 (by O. Pelosi), SHC, Volume X, Albany, NY: Greece and Cyprus Research Center, 2001, 252 pages
- Andreas G. Orphanides and P. W. Wallace, Enosis and the British (by R. Coughlan), SHC, Volume XI, Albany, NY: Greece and Cyprus Research Center, 2004, 252 pages
- Andreas G. Orphanides and P. W. Wallace, German Texts: Turkish Period after 1800 (by H. A. Polhsander), SHC, Volume XII, Albany, NY: Greece and Cyprus Research Center, 2006, 302 pages
- Andreas G. Orphanides and P. W. Wallace, George Boustronios, A Narrative of the Chronicle of Cyprus 1456-1489 (translated by N. Coureas and H. Polhsander), SHC, Volume XIII, Albany, NY: Greece and Cyprus Research Center, 2005, 252 pages
- Andreas G. Orphanides and P. W. Wallace, Swedish Texts (by Elisabeth Piltz), SHC, Volume XIV, Albany, NY: Greece and Cyprus Research Center, 2007, 121 pages, 3 plates

== Awards and honours ==
- Gold Medal of the Ministry of Education and Science of Armenia "for his significant contribution to the field of Education and Science, and for his support to modernization of programs of Universities of the Republic of Armenia", 2014
- Doctor Honoris Causa awarded by the Senate of Ovidius University, 2012
- Second Prize awarded for his string quartet Cyprus Zephyr, Malta International Composition Competition, 2017

== Musical compositions ==
- Composed "String Quartet "Cyprus Zephyr"", 2017
- Composed "Saxophone Quartet "Cyprus Zephyr"", 2017
- Musical CD "Orphanides Meets Kapp–EURASHE 20th Anniversary Gala Concert, Tallinn", 2011
- Composed "Δοξάστε-Γιορτάστε" (for orchestra and choir), 2008
- Composed "Symphonic Poem "Anerada" for Piano and Orchestra", 2006
- Composed "Symphonic Suite in F major "Κοινές Ρίζες" (for symphony orchestra), 2005
- Composed and wrote the libretto of "Symphony in D minor "Olympic Legacy"" (for symphony orchestra, choir and soloist-baritone), 2005
- Composed and wrote the lyrics of CD "Φυλλοκάρκια [Heart Leaves]" (13 songs), Nicosia, Aria Music Records, 2004 (donated to charity)
- Wrote the lyrics of Popular Oratorio - CD "Νησί του Έρωτα [Island of Love]" (12 songs), Athens, 2000
- Composed and wrote the lyrics of the Anthems of two universities. i.e. Open University of Cyprus and European University Cyprus, 2006
