= Andreas Tsiatinis =

Cypriot basketball player (born 1985)

Free Agent
- Position: Small forward

Personal information
- Born: November 15, 1985 (age 41) Nicosia, Cyprus
- Listed height: 6 ft 6 in (1.98 m)
- Listed weight: 200 lb (91 kg)

Career information
- Playing career: 2004–present

Andreas Tsiatinis (born November 15, 1985, in Nicosia, Cyprus) is a Cypriot basketball player. He measures 198 cm (6 ft 6 in) tall. He is a small forward. He has won the Cyprus League with APOEL.
