= EURASHE =

European Association for the Applied Sciences in Higher Education (EURASHE)
- Formation: 1990
- Headquarters: Brussels, Belgium
- Website: www.eurashe.eu

EURASHE logo

EURASHE (European Association for the Applied Sciences in Higher Education) is a member-based organisation gathering universities of applied sciences, university colleges, as well as national and sectorial associations and other higher education institutions that offer programmes with a strong involvement of the world of work and conduct applied research within the Bologna cycles.

The association was founded in Patras, Greece, in 1990, with a mission to promote the value of applied higher education at both national and European level. Its 100+ members overall represent more than 500 applied higher education institutions, located mainly inside the EHEA as well as Canada, India, and the Near East.

EURASHE is deeply involved the Bologna Process, being a consultative member of the Bologna Follow-Up Group (BFUG) since 2001 together with other stakeholder organisations. This role is an important feature of the Bologna Process, as consultative members bring their experience and perspective directly into policy discussions, helping to connect political commitments with practical implementation. EURASHE uses this position to represent the perspective of applied sciences universities and other professionally oriented higher education institutions.

On the practical level, EURASHE organises workshops, webinars and networking events for the applied higher education community, focused on relevant policy issues for its members and stakeholders.

== See also ==
- European Association for Quality Assurance in Higher Education
- European Students' Union
- European University Association
