= Irena Papadopoulos =

Cypriot academic

Irena Papadopoulos (born in Famagusta, Cyprus) is a Greek Cypriot transcultural nursing researcher and now resides in the United Kingdom.

Papadopoulos currently heads the research centre for transcultural studies in health at Middlesex University but has been working within the NHS and the university sector for over 30 years. During this period she has led a number of projects aimed at changing nursing practice, developing new curricula, developing new assessment tools, establishing quality systems, and integrating nursing education within the higher education sector. She has conducted various research projects using a range of methodologies, and have provided consultancy to individuals and institutions. She has conducted research on the health, the health promotion and the social care needs of minority ethnic groups, asylum seekers and refugees. She has developed and delivered programmes aimed at promoting cultural competence as well as tools to measure individual and organisation competence. Her main research interests are culture/ethnicity/diversity and health, cultural competence, inequalities in health, disability and health, consumer involvement, regeneration and health, and the contribution of the voluntary sector to health and social welfare. She was for a number of years responsible for her school's research capacity programme which aimed at developing research skills for academic staff and research students. she has led the development and delivery of a Masters in Applied Health Research, an Intensive European Programme in Transcultural Nursing, a Masters in European Nursing, as well as supervising research students. Further, she led the Research Assessment Exercise for the 'Nursing' Unit of Assessment, both in 1996 and 2000, and was instrumental in establishing the Ethics Committee of the former School of Health, Biological and Environmental Sciences, and University's Journal of Health Social and Environmental Issues.

Papadopoulos also has a vast experience related to the voluntary sector. In 1994, she co-founded the ‘Greek and Greek Cypriot Community of Enfield’, a very successful voluntary organisation. She has also been -amongst others- an elected executive member of a Racial Equality Council, and a Citizen's Advice Bureau. Her contribution in the voluntary sector has involved my participation in a number of committees and close liaisons with policy makers and funders at local and national level. In 2003 she established the ‘Papadopoulos Award for Outstanding Caring Acts by Young People in the Greek community’. She is a Scholar of the Transcultural Nursing Society and a former Dozor Scholar. She is the co-author of a book on transcultural nursing (1998) and the editor of a book on transcultural health and social care (2006).
