= Tom Loizides =

Cyprus international rugby union player

- Born: Thomas Loizides; 2 August 1988 (age 38) London, England
- Height: 1.78 m (5 ft 10 in)
- Weight: 88 kg (194 lb)
- University: Wellington College, Berkshire

Rugby union career
- Position(s): Wing; Centre
Senior career
Years	Team	Apps	(Points)
?-2006, 2006-2008	London Irish		
2008-present	Saracens		
–	Esher RFC		
International career
Years	Team	Apps	(Points)
2011-present	Cyprus	2	(0)

Thomas Loizides (born 2 August 1988) is an English-born Greek Cypriot rugby player who plays for the Cyprus national rugby union team and has done since 2011. He also plays for the English club Esher RFC. He joined the club in July 2008 after leaving the Saracens.

Loizides plays at Wing, but played at Centre when he was younger. Loizides attended Wellington College, Berkshire.
