= European Association for Quality Assurance in Higher Education =

- Founded: 2000
- Headquarters: Brussels, Belgium
- Members: 63 members
- Official language: English
- President: Péter Levente Lakatos
- Director: Anna Gover
- Affiliations: 43 affiliates
- Website: www.enqa.eu

The European Association for Quality Assurance in Higher Education (ENQA), formerly the European Network for Quality Assurance in Higher Education, was established to represent quality assurance and accreditation organisations from the European Higher Education Area and internationally.

== Activities ==
In 2003, the Ministers of the Bologna process asked ENQA to elaborate "an agreed set of standards, procedures and guidelines" for higher education. The resulting European Standards and Guidelines for Quality Assurance (ESG) was adopted by the Bologna Process Ministers in 2005 and was revised in 2015.

=== EQAR ===
ENQA worked with the other "E4" agencies, the European University Association (EUA), the European Association of Institutions in Higher Education (EURASHE) and the European Students Union (ESU), to establish the European Quality Assurance Register for Higher Education (EQAR), which makes available a validated list of higher education quality assurance agencies which adhere to the ESG, and reduces the risk of bodies which purport to grant accreditation without rigorous review. EQAR is composed of the founding E4 bodies, government members (any state which is part of the Bologna Process may join) and social partners, and governed by an elected Executive Board. It has a small secretariat and is based in Brussels.
