= Cyprus Conflict Resolution Trainers Group =

The Cyprus Conflict Resolution Trainers Group (also referred to in the media or literature as CRTG: Conflict Resolution Trainers Group, or simply Trainers’ Group or The Trainers) was founded in 1994 by about 30 Cypriot peace pioneers (15 Greek Cypriots and 15 Turkish Cypriots). Because this group has introduced conflict resolution and structured dialogue concepts to a few thousand Cypriots, it is credited for the formation of an embryonic peace movement.

== Historical Overview ==
The "core group" of the CRTG had come together through their participation in various conflict resolution workshops conducted by professionals and academics from the United States and Canada, particularly Herb Kelman of Harvard University, Ron Fisher of the University of Saskatchewan, Louise Diamond of the Institute for MultiTrack Diplomacy in Washington, D.C., and Diana Chigas of the Conflict Management Group in Boston. Most members of the CRTG have participated in conflict resolution workshops organized by the Cyprus Consortium and an advanced follow-up training for trainers. A few were also members of the Bi-communal Steering Committee, which strategized and facilitated the organization of the first workshops in Cyprus. This committee enjoyed the strong support of the Executive Director of Fulbright, Daniel Hadjittofis, who provided strategic and logistical support. His involvement was instrumental to the success, because Fulbright was recognized as a neutral bicommunal institution since it was created before the conflicts of 1963 and 1974 and could therefore host bi-communal events without political complexities.

== The Cyprus Consortium ==
The Cyprus Consortium, was an ad hoc cooperation between the Institute for Multi-Track Diplomacy, the Conflict Management Group and NTL Institute for Applied Behavioral Science). It was formed to support the joint Cyprus Conflict management Project" in Cyprus, which was sponsored by the Cyprus Fulbright Commission and funded by the US Agency for International Development.

== The Bi-communal Steering Committee ==
The Bi-communal Conflict Resolution Steering Committee was formed in November 1992 by 12 (6 Greek Cypriots, 6 Turkish Cypriots) peace pioneers, who took upon their shoulders the task to coordinate bi-communal activities in Cyprus. Their most notable achievement was the organization of a 10-day-long training in conflict resolution that took place in Oxford, UK. What became known as the Oxford Group attracted extraordinary positive and negative publicity. It is this visibility that eventually lead to the formation of The Cyprus Consortium.

== Developing a vision for the future ==
Between the fall of 1994 and the summer of 1995, this group conducted structured dialogues (also known as Interactive Management workshops) using a methodology grounded on the science of Structured dialogic design aiming to facilitate peace-building efforts in Cyprus. Two separate groups (Greek Cypriots and Turkish Cypriots) met on a weekly basis, both in separate community meetings and in bi-communal settings.

== High visibility of the CRTG's contributions ==
=== Cyprus Peace Bazaar ===
In the third phase of their work, the CCRTG proposed a total of 241 possible projects designed to work toward their vision, and they eventually selected 15 of these projects (using democratic structured dialogue) for implementation during the following year. On June 24, 1995 they held an Agora/Bazaar in the premises of Ledra Palace to which they invited others who had expressed interest in joining them in peace building efforts.

==== Selected projects ====
| # | PROJECT |
| 1 | Form study groups on Cyprus Federation/EU |
| 2 | Establish regular columns in G/C and T/C newspapers by members of opposite community |
| 3 | Schedule series of lectures by Orthodox and Muslim priests |
| 4 | Establish bi-communal meetings for T/Cs and G/Cs who studied together in integrated schools before 1974 (English School and American Academy) |
| 5 | Find sponsors for publishing books on poetry, short stories, art, folk dances in both languages |
| 6 | Establish a bi-communal women’s research center and support group |
| 7 | Form a bi-communal research center on history, social structure, traditions, culture, oral history of the two communities |
| 8 | Conduct bi-communal workshops for young political leaders |
| 9 | Establish bi-communal center to teach Internet and Greek and Turkish languages |
| 10 | Organize bi-communal workshops on problem solving techniques for educationalists |
| 11 | Set up bi-communal training/research center on conflict resolution and problem solving |
| 12 | Create bi-communal dialogue groups to focus on critical issues (property concerns, identity, security, etc.) |
| 13 | Organize poetry evenings for bi-communal audience |
| 14 | Organize concert with theme Peace on the Green line |
| 15 | Study the living conditions of T/Cs who live in the south and G/Cs who live in the north and make joint public report |

==== Implementation ====
The Cyprus Conflict Resolution Trainers Group requested financial support from the UN with a historical letter sent to the UN Secretary-General, signed by one TC (Sevgül Uludağ) and one GC (Harry Anastasiou). Almost three years later, in late 1999, the UN established the UNOPS program, which provided funding for only a few of the above 15 and for more than a hundred additional peace projects on the island.

=== International Recognition ===
During a special event held under the auspices of Fulbright, the UN, the US Embassy and a number of other Diplomatic Representations in December 1997, the members of the CRTG were honored. The event took place in a newly constructed temporary building, in the yards of Ledra Palace, which was built by the UN and operated by Fulbright to host the increasing number of bi-communal workshops and seminars. During the event, a historical overview of all bi-communal groups created and facilitated by the CRTG was shown,

=== Special mentioning in a UN Resolution ===
The work of the CRTG was recognized through United Nations Security Council Resolution 1117, which stated on 27 June 1997, Paragraph 13: “Welcomes the efforts of the United Nations and others concerned to promote the holding of bi-communal events so as to build trust and mutual respect between the two communities, urges that these efforts be continued, acknowledges the recent cooperation from all concerned on both sides to that end, and strongly encourages them to take further steps to facilitate such bi-communal events and to ensure that they take place in conditions of safety and security.”

=== A stimulus for academic peace studies ===
The work of the CRTG stimulated dozens of PhDs and Masters in the fields of Peace, Conflict Resolution and related studies. For example, Oliver Wolleh from Berghof Peace Support published a book on the work of the CRTG. Three members of the CRTG (Harry Anastasiou, Maria Hadjipavlou and Yiannis Laouris) have also described the work of the CRTG in their respective books.

=== Evaluations ===
A number of scholars evaluated the impact of the conflict resolution activities on the island. Canan Öztoprak, also one of the founding members of CRTG, who also served as Minister of Education and Culture in Northern Cyprus published an extensive criticism on the positives and negatives of the Bi-Communal meetings and Activities mainly organized by the CRTG. Birte Vogel and Oliver Richmond have critically engaged with the question of external support to the peace movement
