= Cypriot Canzoniere =

The Cypriot Canzoniere (Song-book) οr the Cypriot Rime d'Amore (Love Rhymes; Greek: Ρίμες Αγάπης) is a collection of 16th-century poems in the Cypriot dialect influenced by the Italian Renaissance poetry and especially Petrarchism.

The poems were written by a one or more, anonymous Cypriot poets that were directly influenced by Italian poetry. The manuscript consists of 156 poems focusing mostly on love themes. Some of the poems are direct translations of Petrarch and Sannazaro. They are the first poems directly influenced by the Renaissance in the Greek language, for example they introduced the ottava and terza. The societal, cultural and musical norms in Venetian Cyprus are documented by the chronicler Etienne Lusignan and help shed light into the references of the poems. Elsie Mathiopoulou-Tornaritou was the first scholar to suggest that they were written by multiple authors and a time span of perhaps seven decates until the Ottoman conquest of Cyprus in 1571. Additionally, she was the first to use the term canzoniere to describe the collection.

The poems survive in a single manuscript, codex IX 32, currently located at the Marcian Library in Venice. They were first published by the French philologist Émile Legrand in 1881. And subsequently, by Themis Siapkara-Pitsillidou who supported the hypothesis that they were written by a single Cypriot poet.

== See also ==
- Cypriot dialect
- Venetian Cyprus
- Leontios Machairas
- Georgios Boustronios
