= Ümit Yaşar Oğuzcan =

Turkish Poet

- Born: 22 August 1926; Tarsus, Turkey
- Died: 4 November 1984 (aged 58); Istanbul, Turkey
- Occupations: Poet, author

Signature
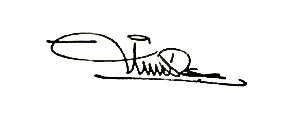

Ümit Yaşar Oğuzcan (22 August 1926 – 4 November 1984) was a Turkish poet.

== Life ==
He was born on 22 August 1926 in Tarsus. He studied in Konya and Eskişehir. He served as an accountant in the Niğde branch office and then in the general directorate of İş Bankası (bank) in Ankara. He retired in 1977 while he was the vice public relations director of the bank. After retirement, he founded an art gallery in Istanbul. He died on 4 November 1984.

== As a poet ==
His first poem was published in Yedigün literary periodical while he was still a student. In later years he continued writing. He published his first poetry book in 1947. He also published a travel book about his travels in Europe. In total, he has published 33 poetry books and 17 other books. Most of his poems are love poetry. But he also wrote satire poems. In his earlier poems he was under the influence of Faruk Nafiz Çamlıbel and Yahya Kemal Beyatlı. In later poetry, he followed the style of Orhan Veli Kanık
