= Filippos Filippou =

Filippos Filippou may refer to:

- Filippos Filippou (runner) (born 1956), Cypriot long-distance runner
- Filippos Filippou (footballer) (born 1975), Cypriot footballer
