= Roys Poyiadjis =

Greek Cypriot entrepreneur and financier (born 1965)

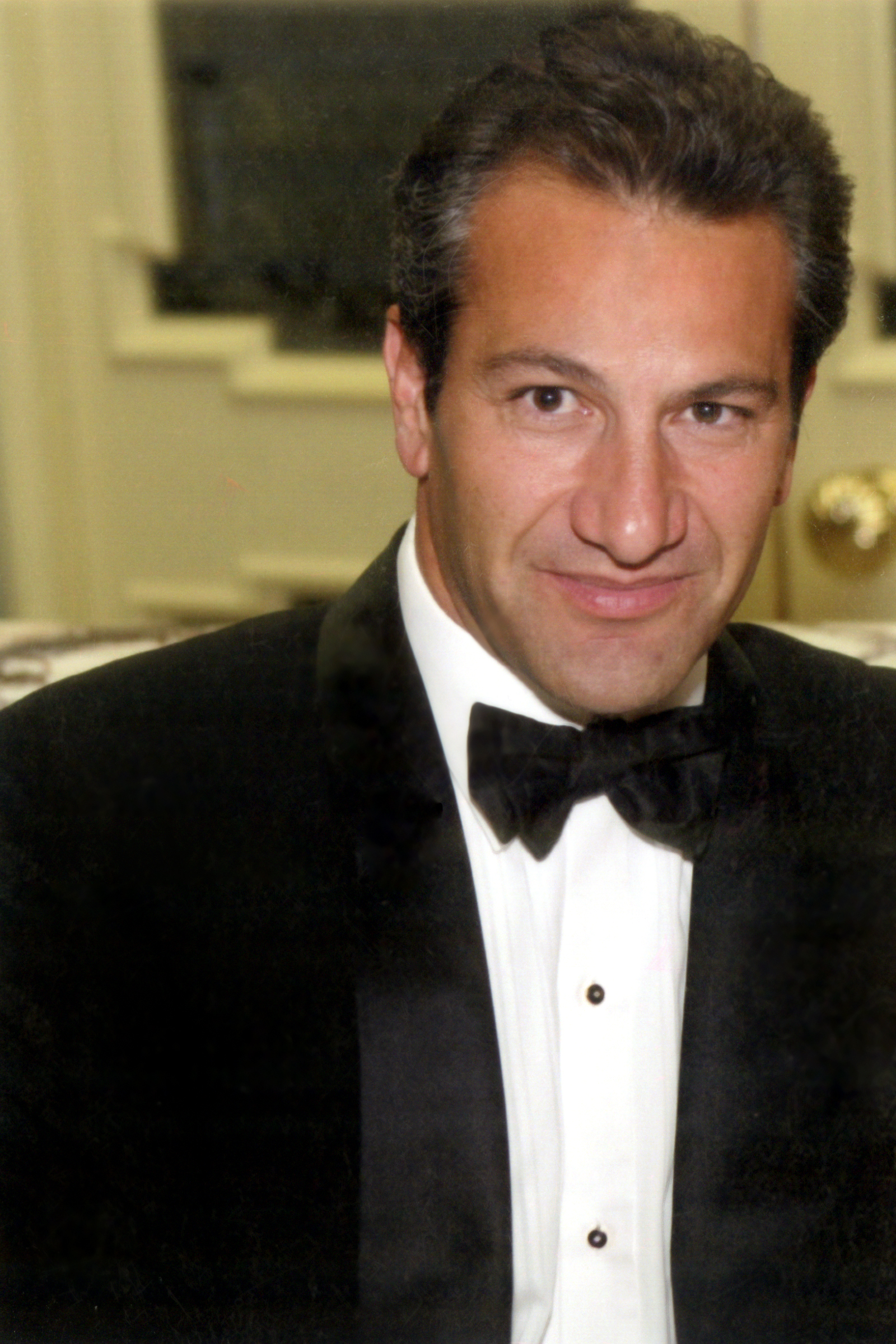
- Poyiadjis in 2011
- Born: 14 August 1965 (age 60); Famagusta, Cyprus
- Citizenship: Cypriot and British
- Education: University of Kent; London Business School
- Occupations: Entrepreneur, financier
- Criminal charge: Securities fraud
- Criminal penalty: $200 million

Roys Poyiadjis (Greek: Ρόις Πογιατζής; born 14 August 1965) is a Greek Cypriot entrepreneur and financier. He is most notable for his role in the largest Securities and Exchange Commission (SEC) settlement with an individual, $200 million, after he pleaded guilty to conspiracy to commit security fraud.

== Biography ==
Poyiadjis was born in Cyprus, and on 14 August 1974, his ninth birthday, he and his family fled their homes in Famagusta as a result of Turkish invasion of Cyprus. They lived in a refugee camp. He married Donna Florence Costanzo Poyiadjis in June 2000 and has two children. Poyiadjis received a bachelor's degree in 1989 from the University of Kent in England and an MBA from the London Business School in 1993. In 1988, he won the gold medal in the British Universities Boxing Championships in the Light Heavyweight division.

Poyiadjis worked for Morgan Stanley Co. and Lehman Brothers International Ltd between 1993 and 1996 in the United Kingdom. He later formed a merchant bank called Alpha Capital, which focused on funding technology companies.

According to Forbes magazine, in 1997 Poyiadjis met Lycourgos Kyprianou, a fellow Greek Cypriot with a software company called AremisSoft. Poyiadjis invested $7 million in AremisSoft in October 1997 and helped Kyprianou secure another $12 million of financing in March 1998. The company went public on Nasdaq in April 1999. Poyiadjis, became president and vice-chairman in 1998, and became CEO in 2000 (Kyprianou became chairman and chief technology officer). By August 2000, Poyiadjis and Kyprianou owned about 30% of the company, and in Feb. 2001, they became co-chief executive officers. Irwin L. Jacobs was one of AremisSoft's largest shareholders. Poyiadjis resigned from AremisSoft on 30 September 2001.

In 2005 Poyiadjis founded Platinum Capital Partners, Inc a holding company for the Poyiadjis Family Office with investment activities primarily focused in technology, private equity, real estate, and special situations.

In 2014, Poyiadjis and Martua Sitorus, the co-founder of Wilmar International formed a partnership to create the largest biofuel power plant in Japan. The plant's 20-year feed-in tariff is valued at US$1.5 billion. In 2012, Poyiadjis began a venture to build the first independent power producer on the Island of Cyprus. But due to the Greek and Cypriot economic crisis, the project changed course resulting in a biofuel power plant in Japan.

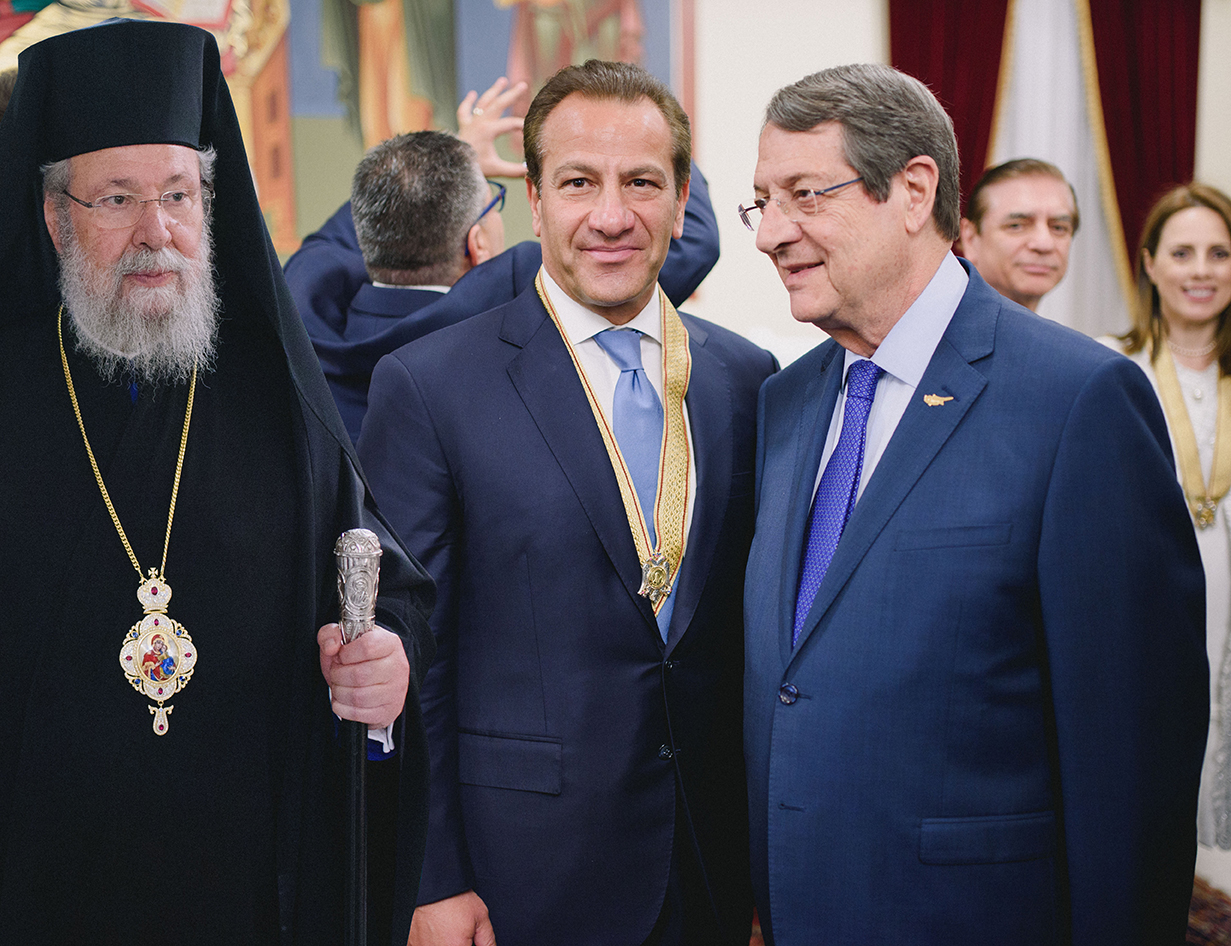
From left to right: Archbishop Chrysostomos II, Roys Poyiadjis, and President Nicos Anastasiades at a ceremony to celebrate the repatriation of a mosaic stolen from the church of Panagia Kanakaria. Poyiadjis wears the Golden Medallion of St. Paul, awarded to him for his contribution in the repatriation.

Roys Poyiadjis, along with an art historian and another Cypriot businessman, were responsible for the repatriation of the mosaic of St. Andrew in 2018. The mosaic was a work of art stolen from the church of Panagia Kanakaria in 1975.

In April 2018 Poyiadjis submitted an investment offer to acquire the Omonia FC. On 24 May 2018, he decided to withdraw his offer to acquire Omonia, stating that in his opinion the acquisition process lacked transparency and the Omonia FC board had already predetermined the outcome in favor of Stavros Papastavrou before the general assembly vote.

== Securities and Exchange Commission settlement ==
In May 2001, the United States Securities and Exchange Commission (SEC) began to investigate AremisSoft after a New York Times article suggested that the company overstated the value of a contract to automate the National Healthcare Service in Bulgaria. On 4 October 2001, the SEC filed a civil enforcement action against AremisSoft. On 19 December 2001, a federal grand jury in the Southern District of New York filed an indictment charging Poyiadjis and Kyprianou with securities fraud in connection with AremisSoft. The funds under question were in bank accounts on the Isle of Man.

Both Poyiadjis and Kyprianou were in Cyprus at the time of the indictment. In 2005, Poyiadjis voluntarily returned to the United States to plead guilty to one count of conspiracy to commit security fraud. Poyiadjis' proceeds from the sale of AremisSoft stock were $150 million. The case reached a global settlement when Poyiadjis agreed to pay $200 million. According to Lawyer Magazine, this is the largest SEC case of its kind. In July 2010, Poyiadjis was sentenced by Judge Laura Taylor Swain to three years of probation. At Poyiadjis's sentencing, Judge Swain stated that she took into consideration "the extent of Mr. Poyiadjis's cooperation," and "Mr. Poyiadjis's remorse, as reflected both in his words and actions." Lycourgos Kyprianou remains a fugitive from justice in the United States.

The case was described in the book Selling America Short, by Richard C. Sauer, which is about the author's time as an assistant director with the US Securities and Exchange Commission: "What was supposed to be a quick legal smash and grab [for the SEC] is turning into procedural purgatory."

== Philanthropy ==
Poyiadjis became involved with the New York University School of Medicine when Professor Rodolfo Llinas diagnosed Poyiadjis' brother, Alkis Poyiadjis, with schizoaffective disorder and referred him for successful treatment in Switzerland. Poyiadjis has since donated several million dollars to the Department of Physiology and Neuroscience and in support of Dr. Llinas' research studies. Poyiadjis has also volunteered to participate in various research studies conducted by the medical school. Poyiadjis also provided financial support to the Department of Functional Neurosurgery at the University Hospital at Zurich, where Alkis was treated.

At the NYU School of Medicine, Poyiadjis formed three companies (NeuroResonance LLC, NeuroControl Systems LLC, NeuroInterface LLC) that are commercialising drugs and devices to suppress thalamocortical dysrhythmia.

In 2013, Poyiadjis established a scholarship fund at the University of Cyprus to provide three annual scholarships for ten years to be awarded to three students who demonstrate academic excellence and are in financial need. These scholarships are awarded to students in humanities, pure and applied sciences and engineering.
