= Michael Theodoulou =

Cypriot journalist

Michael Theodoulou is a journalist based in Nicosia, Cyprus who reports for the Christian Science Monitor, The Times, National Public Radio, and The Scotsman. He has reported for numerous news outlets over a long career. He frequently reports on Cyprus and the Middle East. He traveled to Iran many times in the 1990s, and his reports on Ayatollah Khomeini are often cited.

He retired as an active journalist in May 2018.
