= Petros Kestoras =

Cypriot diplomat

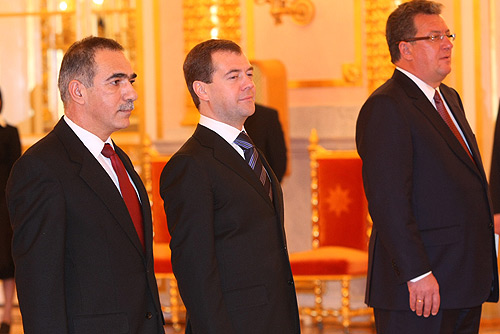
Petros Kestoras presents his Letters of Credence to Russian president Dmitry Medvedev on 16 January 2009.

Petros Kestoras (Greek: Πέτρος Κέστορας) (born 21 October 1957 in Kato Zodhia) is a Cypriot diplomat and former ambassador extraordinary and plenipotentiary of the Republic of Cyprus to the Russian Federation.

Educated at the University of Padua with a degree in political sciences (international politics), Kestoras worked in various positions of the Cyprus Ministry of Foreign Affairs in Cyprus and abroad until his first ambassadorial appointment in 2002 as the ambassador of Cyprus to the People's Republic of China. He held the post until July 2007, when he returned to Cyprus to head the European Union department of the Foreign Ministry, and in September 2008 he took up the post of Ambassador of Cyprus to Russia.

In November 2016, he became an ambassador in Poland and in March 2017, the ambassador to Lithuania.

Kestoras speaks English, Greek, Italian and French.
