= Andreas Sofokleous =

Cypriot footballer (born 1973)

Personal information
- Full name: Andreas Sofokleous
- Date of birth: September 7, 1973 (age 53)
- Place of birth: Limassol, Cyprus
- Height: 1.79 m (5 ft 10 in)
- Position: Defender

Senior career*
Years	Team	Apps	(Gls)
1991–1998	Apollon Limassol	74	(3)
1998–2000	AEL Limassol	45	(6)
2000–2005	AEK Larnaca	81	(4)
2005	APEP Pitsilia	1	(0)
Total		201	(13)

International career
1998–1999	Cyprus	4	(0)
- * Club domestic league appearances and goals

Andreas Sofokleous (born September 7, 1973) is a Cypriot former international football defender.

He played for two rivals of Limassol, Apollon and AEL, AEK Larnaca and APEP Pitsilia.

== Honours ==
AEK Larnaca

- Cypriot Cup: 2003–04
