= Cyprus College =

Coordinates: 35.1596°N 33.3385°E

- Type: Private College
- Established: 1961
- Students: 3,500
- Location: Nicosia, Limassol, Cyprus
- Website: http://www.cycollege.ac.cy

Cyprus College is a for-profit college in Nicosia and Limassol, Cyprus. It was founded in 1961 by Ioannis Gregoriou as a business school, and thereafter it expanded into a number of other fields, including computer science, graduate studies, and social sciences. In 2006, when the college had an enrolment of 3,500, it submitted under the Deanship of Andreas G. Orphanides an application to the Ministry of Education and Culture of the Republic of Cyprus to establish a private university with the name European University Cyprus. Approval for this came in September 2007, and Cyprus College continued its operation independently of European University Cyprus. Since September 2010, Cyprus College has also been operating in Limassol in new facilities that comply with the required standards of a modern college.
