= Michalis Filippou =

Greek footballer

Personal information
- Full name: Michail Filippou
- Date of birth: 2 February 1951 (age 75)
- Place of birth: Piraeus, Greece

Managerial career
- Years: Team
- 1992–1994: Doxa Drama
- 1997–1998: Doxa Drama
- 1998–1999: Trikala
- 2000: Kavala
- 2001: Trikala
- 2005: Anagennisi Arta
- 2006: Trikala
- 2007: Trikala

Michalis Filippou (Greek: Μιχάλης Φιλίππου; born 2 February 1951) is a Greek football manager.
