= Alexander Filippou =

Greek chemist

Alexander C. Filippou (born 19 August 1958, Thessaloniki, Greece) has been a professor of Inorganic Chemistry at the Rheinische-Friedrich-Wilhelms-University Bonn since 2005.

== Biography ==
He studied chemistry at the Technical University of Munich from 1976 to 1982, receiving his diploma in 1982 with the thesis "Synthesis of anionic carbyne complexes", in the group of Professor Dr. E.O. Fischer. In 1984 he completed his dissertation "New pathways of synthesis of anionic ketene- and carbyne complexes of 16 Group elements through neutral substituted carbyne-carbonyl complexes" also in the group of Professor Dr. E.O. Fischer at the Institute of Inorganic Chemistry, Technical University of Munich. In 1992 he was postdoctoral lecture qualification in chemistry in the group of Professor Dr. W.A. Herrmann, Technical University of Munich, thesis: "Metal centerad coupling reactions of C1 ligands". In 1992 he was temporary supervisor of the research group of Professor M.L.H. Green in Oxford, starting December 1992 Fellow of St. Matthews College, Oxford.

In 1993 he became professor (C3) of Inorganic Chemistry at the Humboldt-University of Berlin and in 2005 he became professor (W3) of Inorganic Chemistry at the Rheinische Friedrich-Wilhelms-Universitaet Bonn.

Filippou has made a significant contribution in the research of heavier homologues of carbon (Si, Ge, Sn, Pb) regarding the ability to form a triple bond to a metal.

== Sources ==
- Filippou, Alexander C.; Weidemann, Nils; Philippopoulos, Athanassios I.; Schnakenburg, Gregor (11 September 2006). "Activation of Aryl Germanium(II) Chlorides by [Mo(PMe3)6] and [W(η2-CH2PMe2)H(PMe3)4]: A New Route to Metal–Germanium Triple Bonds". Angewandte Chemie International Edition. 45 (36). Wiley: 5987–5991. doi:10.1002/anie.200602061. ISSN 1433-7851. PMID 16927310.
- Filippou, Alexander C.; Weidemann, Nils; Schnakenburg, Gregor; Rohde, Holger; Philippopoulos, Athanassios I. (3 December 2004). "Tungsten-Lead Triple Bonds: Syntheses, Structures, and Coordination Chemistry of the Plumbylidyne Complexestrans-[X(PMe3)4W?Pb(2,6-Trip2C6H3)]". Angewandte Chemie International Edition. 43 (47). Wiley: 6512–6516. doi:10.1002/anie.200461725. ISSN 1433-7851. PMID 15578776.
- Filippou, Alexander C.; Rohde, Holger; Schnakenburg, Gregor (19 April 2004). "Cover Picture: Triple Bond to Lead: Synthesis and Characterization of the Plumbylidyne Complextrans-[Br(PMe3)4Mo≡Pb−C6H3-2,6-Trip2] (Angew. Chem. Int. Ed. 17/2004)". Angewandte Chemie International Edition. 43 (17). Wiley: 2181. doi:10.1002/anie.200490048. ISSN 1433-7851.
- Filippou, Alexander C.; Rohde, Holger; Schnakenburg, Gregor (19 April 2004). "Triple Bond to Lead: Synthesis and Characterization of the Plumbylidyne Complextrans-[Br(PMe3)4Mo≡Pb−C6H3-2,6-Trip2]". Angewandte Chemie International Edition. 43 (17). Wiley: 2243–2247. doi:10.1002/anie.200353477. ISSN 1433-7851. PMID 15108133.
- Filippou, Alexander C.; Portius, Peter; Philippopoulos, Athanassios I.; Rohde, Holger (27 January 2003). "Triple Bonding to Tin: Synthesis and Characterization of the Stannylyne Complex trans-[Cl(PMe3)4W≡Sn−C6H3-2,6-Mes2]". Angewandte Chemie International Edition. 42 (4). Wiley: 445–447. doi:10.1002/anie.200390135. ISSN 1433-7851. PMID 12569513.
- Filippou, Alexander C.; Philippopoulos, Athanassios I.; Portius, Peter; Neumann, Dirk U. (4 August 2000). "Synthesis and Structure of the Germylyne Complexestrans-[X(dppe)2W≡Ge(η1-Cp*)] (X=Cl, Br, I) and Comparison of the W≡E Bonds (E=C, Ge) by Density Functional Calculations". Angewandte Chemie International Edition. 39 (15). Wiley: 2778–2781. doi:10.1002/1521-3773(20000804)39:15<2778::aid-anie2778>3.0.co;2-2. ISSN 1433-7851. PMID 10934426.
