= Stephanos Stephanides =

- Born: Stephanos Stephanides; 1949 (age 75–76) Trikomo, Cyprus
- Occupation: Academic professor, poet, translator, critic, ethnographer, documentary film maker

Stephanos Stephanides (born 22 October 1949) is a Cypriot-born author, poet, translator, critic, ethnographer, and documentary film maker. In 1957 he moved with his father to the United Kingdom and since then he has lived in several countries for more than 34 years. He returned to Cyprus in 1991 as part of the founding faculty of the University of Cyprus where he holds the position of Professor of English and Comparative Literature. Stephanides’ dominant and literary language is English, and he is also fluent in Greek, Spanish and Portuguese. His early migration from Cyprus to the United Kingdom and subsequent work and travel in many countries has been influential in shaping the transcultural character of his work. As a young lecturer at the university of Guyana, he became deeply interested in Caribbean literary and cultural expression and his anthropological work with the descendant of Indian indentured labourers in Guyanese villages and sugar plantations marked the beginning of a lifelong interest in Indian culture and the Indian diaspora, his creative and academic writing span issues of cross-culturality, dislocation and migration. Hail Mother Kali deals with issues of a broken postcolonial society of racially mixed Indian and African descendants in Guyana.

== Early life ==
Stephanides was born in Trikomo a village located in the North-east part of Cyprus. When he was eight years old, his father took him from Cyprus to the United Kingdom. Following his parents separation when he was still an infant, he lived with his grandparent in the village. His work documents warm memories of village life of that time that period, which was also marked by the emergence of the EOKA organization and the struggle against British Colonial Rule. His father settled in Bristol but Stephanides was left in Manchester for two years with his uncle's family. He subsequently went to school in Bristol. In his teenage years he developed a love for literature, writing poetry, and learning foreign languages when he was at school and was encouraged by his teachers to pursue literary studies at University. Stephanides graduated from Cardiff University, Wales, in 1973, and obtained a PhD from the same University in 1981.

== Life and work ==
He left the United Kingdom in 1976 and lived and travelled in Greece, Spain, and Portugal for two years before receiving an appointment with the University of Guyana in 1978 where he stayed for six years. As a result, he became immersed in Caribbean and Brazilian culture. He moved to Washington DC in the mid-80s where he worked as a professional translator and conference interpreter, researcher and writer. In 1985 he was awarded a grant by the American Translators Association to translate a book on British Guyana written in Portuguese in the 19th century by a Portuguese writer. In 1988 he made a documentary film on Kali worship in Guyana called Hail Mother Kali that was short-listed for an award for excellence by the Society of Anthro-Journalism. In 1989 he was awarded the poetry award of the Society for Humanistic Anthropology of the American Anthropological Association (AAA) for poetry written during field work in Guyana. In 1991 he returned to Cyprus accompanied by his US-born wife and daughter. Stephanides cites a variety of authors from differing cultural and social backgrounds as influences in his work. He cites Derek Walcott as an influence in the English language, drawing inspiration from him through the way he brings together the Creole idiom into with the classical. He also cites Constantine P. Cavafy as a favourite. He was a friend of the Greek-Cypriot writer Niki Marangou, translating her poetry into English and maintaining a close literary relationship with her until her death.

== Contribution to Cypriot literature ==
He has served twice as a judge for the Commonwealth Writers Prize in 2000 and 2010. He was made Fellow of the English Association and Cavaliere of the Republic of Italy for promoting the Italian culture in Cyprus. In his recent documentary entitled No Man's Land he managed to unite poets from different cultural and linguistic background bringing together speakers of minority languages, such as Catalan, Lithuanian and Portuguese. In 2009, he edited a special issue on Cypriot writing for 91st Meridian, an online publication by the International Writing Program at the University of Iowa, where he also attended the 2016 Fall Residency. The Routledge Encyclopedia for postcolonial writing has also enlisted an entry for Cypriot literature.

== Selected bibliography since 2000 ==
Monographs

- Blue Moon in Rajasthan and other poems. Kochlias: Nicosia, 2005.
- Translating Kali’s Feast: the Goddess in Indo-Caribbean Ritual and Fiction. Editions Rodopi: Amsterdam & Atlanta, 2000, 2nd print 2005 including a print for South Asian circulation only. Reviews: The Book Review (Delhi, January 2002), Crossings (SUNY Binghamton, 2002), Interdisciplinary Literary Studies (Penn State U), Wasafiri (U of London), The Translator (No. 1, 2006, by Shirley Chew, U of Leeds).

Edited collections

- Excerpta Cypriana (ed. and introduction), University of Iowa, International Writing Program. 91st Meridian (Special issue on Cypriot Literature in three languages), Volume 6.3, Summer 2009 (available online).
- Cultures of Memory/Memories of Culture (ed. and introduction), University of Nicosia Press: Nicosia, 2007. Reviewed in Cyprus Review Vol. 20: 1 (Spring 2008), and Vsesvit 9–10 Review of World Literature, Kiev (2010).
- Gramma, Special issue co-edited with Antonis Balasopoulos on the topic "Comparative Literature and Global Studies: Histories and Trajectories". University of Thessaloniki, 2005.
- Beyond the Floating Islands (ed. and introduction with Susan Bassnett), COTEPRA Reader Series, University of Bologna: Bologna, 2002.

Literary translations

- Selection from the Divan by Niki Marangou (trans. & intro), Kochlias: Nicosia, 2001. Seven Tales From Cyprus (trans. & intro), Kochlias: Nicosia, 2003.

Chapters in Books:

- "Theoria/Darshan: Writing Literature in the Field", in Letizia Gramaglia and David Dabydeen (eds), Coral Identities: Essays on Indo-Caribbean Literature (Peepal Tree Press, Leeds, 2013).
- “I Land Home in the Waft of Sibyls with their Ruthful Smiles,” The New Symposium: Writers and Poets on What We Hold in Common. 91st Meridian Books/Autumn Hill Books: Iowa City, 2012, 271–277.
- “Stories and Myths in Translation Theory and the Rethinking of Cultural Tradition,” in Piyush Raval (ed.), Translation Studies. Contemporary Perspectives on Postcolonial and Subaltern Translations, Delhi: Viva Books, 2012, 25–48.
- “Turning East,” Literature for Europe?, in Theo D’Haen and Iannis Goerlandt (eds), Rodopi Studies in Comparative Literature 61, Amsterdam and New York, 2009. 197–215.
- "Translation and Ethnography in Literary Transaction", in Gunilla Lindberg-Wada (ed.), Studying Transcultural Literary History, Berlin & New York: Walter de Gruyter, 2006. 300–309.
- "Translating Against: Comparative Criticism from Post-colonial to Global." Writing back in/and Translation. Peter Lang. Frankfurt au Main 2006. 209–220.
- Encyclopedia of Post-colonial Literature in English (editor and contributor for Cyprus), Routledge, 2005.
- "Thresholds of Translatability Between Centre and Periphery". In: The Periphery Viewing the World. Parousia Publications 60: Athens, 2004: 113–119.
- "Translation, Multiculturalism, and the New Europe". In: Robert Shannan Peckham (ed.), Rethinking Heritage: Cultures and Politics of Europe. I.B. Tauris: London & New York, 2003. 45–58.
- "Contemporary Cypriot Poetry" (translated from Greek), in Mehmet Yashin (ed.), Step-Mother Tongue: From Nationalism to Multiculturalism, Middlesex UP, London 2000. 102–106.
- "The Other in the Idiom of Migrancy". In: Ruth Parkin-Gounelas (ed.), The Other Within. Vol. I. Thessaloniki, 2001. 27–35.
- "The Dislocated Idiom of Martin Carter". In: Stewart Brown (ed.), The Art of Martin Carter. Leeds: Peepal Tree Press, 2000. 219–225.

Journal articles

- "An Island in Translation". Kunapipi, Volume XXXIII, Number 1-2, 2012. 42–53.
- with Susan Bassnett. "Islands, Literature and Cultural Translatability". Transtext(e)s Transcultures. A Journal of Global Cultural Studies. University of Lyon 3. 2008: 5–21.
- "Thinking Through the Gap: Poetic Philosophers and Philosophical Poets". Primerjalna knjizevnos (Ljubljana) 29. Special Issue (2006). 211–216 (translated into Slovenian 27–33). Published by the Slovenian Comparative Literature Association.
- 'Transculturating for Worldliness'. Transtext(e)s Transcultures. A Journal of Global Cultural Studies. (Statement for founding issue, 17–23 in English, French, and Chinese). University of Lyon 3. 2006.
- "Translatability of Memory in an Age of Globalization". Comparative Literature Studies Special Issue: Globalization and World Literature. Guest Editor: Djelal Kadir. Penn State Press. Vol. 41. No. 1. 2004: 101–115.
- "Spaces of Translatability in 20th Century Poetry2, Annales du Monde Anglophone, No. 17 (Paris, Spring 2003): 141–149. Special Issue: European Studies of Modern Anglophone Poetry.
- "Europe, Globalization, and the Translatability of Culture", The European English Messenger. Volume X/2, Autumn 2001. 39–46.
- "Tribute to R.K. Narayan". The Book Review (Delhi). Volume XXV, no. 9, September 2001. 25–26.
- "Letter to Amitav Ghosh". The Book Review (Delhi). Volume XXV, no. 7, July 2001. 27–28.
- "Goddesses, Ghosts, and Translatability in Wilson Harris’ Jonestown". Journal of Caribbean Literatures. Volume two, numbers 1, 2, and 3. Spring 2000. 233–241.
- "Imagining the Homeland in Translation", Beyond the Western Tradition. Translation Perspectives. Volume XI. SUNY, Binghamton, 2000. 53–65.
- "In Conversation", Raj Kamal Jha with Stephanos Stephanides. The Book Review (Delhi). Volume XXIV, no 7, July 2000. 22–25.
- "The House" by Theodossis Nicolaou (in Greek and English) in Beacons: A Journal of Literary Translation. Number 6, 2000. Ed. Breon Mitchell for the Literary Division of the American Translators Association and Indiana University. 178–197.

== Filmography ==
- Poets in No Man's Land (Nicosia, 2012). 20-minute documentary directed and produced with Stephen Nugent.
- Poetry videos with Turkish-Cypriot poet Gur Genc: Speaking of Water (2005) and Between Sand and Water (2006).
- Kali in the Americas (Brooklyn 2003). Ethnographic video https://www.youtube.com/watch?v=kW67fXMMDvg
- Hail Mother Kali (Guyana 1988). (Film footage in the holdings of Smithsonian Institution, Human Studies Film Archives with the title Hail Mother Kali Project.) Reviewed in American Anthropologist, June 1989; in Anthro-Journalism (Washington DC), October 1989; and Revue de la Commission d’anthropologie visuelle (Montreal), Printemps 1991.
