= Nicos Kartakoullis =

Nicos L. Kartakoullis
- Prof. Nicos L. Kartakoullis
- Born: Νίκος Λ. Καρτακούλλης; 1967 (age 58–59)

Professor Nicos L. Kartakoullis (Greek: Νίκος Λ. Καρτακούλλης) is the president of the Council of the University of Nicosia, Cyprus, as well as professor of organisational behaviour and sports management. He served as vice president of the Ethics and Sports Integrity Commission of Cyprus (appointed by the president of the Republic of Cyprus) and as Expert representing the Republic of Cyprus at the International Partnership Against Corruption in Sport (IPACS). Kartakoullis is the president of the Council of the University of Nicosia Foundation and an adjunct professor to the School of Human Kinetics, Faculty of Health Sciences of the University of Ottawa, Canada.

== Early life ==
Kartakoullis was born in Cyprus in 1967. After the Turkish invasion of the island in 1974, he was raised in a refugee camp outside the capital city of Nicosia. He is a graduate of The English School, Nicosia and has served in the Land Forces for his army service as a star sergeant. He completed his university studies in the United States of America and the United Kingdom on scholarships.

As a Fulbright scholar he received his BSc (Honours) degree from Michigan State University and holds three postgraduate degrees (MA Ed., MSc and MBA) from the University of Southampton and University of Leicester in the UK. He earned his PhD from the University of Southampton in the UK.

For his academic performance as a university student he was honoured by the International Academic Honours Society (Phi Beta Delta), as well as by the Outstanding College Students of America Award. He received the Joon S. Moon Distinguished International Alumni Award from Michigan State University.

== Career ==
He was the Chef de Mission (Chief of Mission) for Cyprus for the Olympic Games in Atlanta (1996) and Sydney (2000) and for the Commonwealth Games (1998 and 2002), Mediterranean Games (1997 and 2001).

Kartakoullis was the National Correspondent of the Youth Board of the Republic of Cyprus to the Council of Europe, and offered his services to FIFA, UEFA and International Olympic Committee. He is an International Faculty Member to the United States Sports Academy and a visiting professor at the University of Ottawa, Canada.

Kartakoullis was the Chairman of the Board of Directors of the Cyprus Sport Organisation (Ministry of Sport) between 2008 and 2011.

== Academic career ==
Kartakoullis is the President of the Council of the University of Nicosia, Cyprus. as well as Professor of Organisational Behaviour and Sports Management.

He is the Chairperson of the Department of Hospitality, Tourism and Sport Management, and was previously Vice President for University Relations and Community Outreach. He is involved in a number of research projects funded by the EU (good governance in sport organizations, match fixing, doping and the use of prohibited substances in sports).

His research career includes sport policy intervention research at national and international level. He has represented the Republic of Cyprus, and made presentations to over 85 conferences worldwide. He has more than 50 publications in refereed journals in the areas of organizational behavior/sport management, leisure and tourism management and youth policy, and has published three books.

== Honours ==
For his service to sport and social development in developing countries, he has been honoured by Michigan State University (John S. Moon Distinguished International Alumni Award – Michigan State University) as well as by the House of Commons of Canada.

Kartakoullis is a holder of the "UEFA A" Football Coaching Qualification and has been honoured by the Cyprus Sports Writers’ Association with the "Ethos and Contribution Award for Sports Development," as well as by the “Stelios Kyriakides Award” for the promotion of Cyprus internationally through Education and Sport.

In 2002 he was honoured by the President of the European Olympic Committees Jacques Rogge for his contribution for the Development of the Olympic Movement.
