= Nicos Nicolaides =

Nicolas Nicolaides
- Born: 3 April 1884; Nicosia, Cyprus
- Died: 24 June 1956 (aged 72); Cairo, Egypt
- Occupations: Painter; Writer
- Writing career
- Period: 1907–1956
- Movement: Symbolist

Nicos Nicolaides (Greek: Νίκος Νικολαΐδης; (1884–1956) was a Greek Cypriot painter and writer.

== Early life ==
Nicolaides was born the son of poor parents in Nicosia, Cyprus, on 3 April 1884. A sister, Maria, followed him two years later. He was only six or seven when their parents died, one after another. Their maternal aunt took charge of the two children. She, too, was not well off. When Nicos reached the fourth grade in the local primary school, he left to take a job in a bookbindery. But when the bookbinder dismissed him for spending more time reading the books than binding them, he took refuge with an icon-painter. Once he had learned the craft, his reputation spread throughout Cyprus as a professional painter of icons. Some paintings he did in 1904 still survive in the villages of the Pitsillia region.

== Athens ==
In 1907 Nicolaides left Cyprus for Athens. In his baggage he took with him his first literary exercises (in poetry and prose) written in formal katharevousa Greek. Several of them were to appear in the following year in the Athenian publication A.O.D.O. (Apo Ola dia Olous – From All for All). While in Athens he studied for six months at the Fine Arts Department of the Athens Polytechnic. At the same time he started writing to Γαλάζιο Λουλούδι (the Blue Flower) under the influence of Maurice Maeterlinck and the Symbolist movement, then spreading among contemporary dramatists. Nicolaides was able to extend his experience of theatre (he had already had an introduction through attending performances given in Cyprus by visiting Athenian companies) when he became acquainted with Christomanos and theatrical circles in Athens. A few years later he would be lecturing on Ibsen. The art of theatre became for him a third career (literature being his prime interest and painting second), in which he engaged at various times throughout his life in various capacities—as author, researcher, producer, scene-painter, actor and even, on at least one occasion, accompanist.

== Alexandria, Cairo, and Athens ==
In July 1908, Nicolaides left Athens for Alexandria, and subsequently Cairo. From then until 1915 he moved between the three cities, with frequent trips elsewhere in the Kingdom of Greece (for example Volos), Continental Europe, and the Middle East. In 1914, he was interned by the Turks in Syria.

Travel, changes of scene, perpetual restlessness in quest of new experiences were typical of him not only at this period but also practically all his life. In a Bohemian existence, he travelled on foot through nearly all the countries of Europe and a good many in the Middle East and North Africa, usually sleeping in lodging houses provided for vagrants and eating food that had been discarded by restaurants. His health was undermined and he encountered various difficulties. His only income came from the sale of paintings, which he executed upon any kind of wooden panel that came to hand. Meanwhile, he was working on the composition of short stories and lyric prose. In those two genres, he rapidly developed a distinctive personal style that established his reputation in literary circles in Egypt and Athens.

Parthenon, 1910s

== Work in Athens 1915–1919 ==
Nicolaides spent 1915–19 in Athens, where he mixed with a number of other writers, particularly young men of his age group: Nikos Kanzantzakis, Kostas Varnalis, M. Avgeris, Takis Papatsonis, Kostas Karyotakis, Tellos Agras, Cleon Paraschos, and also Nausica Palamas, the daughter of Kostis Palamas. Later he would dedicate some of his works to them, and also to Eva Sikelianos. Gradually he established himself in literary circles and became recognised as a first-rate prose writer of the younger generation. Many in fact saw him as the leading one. A number of contemporary periodicals sought contributions from him. Some of his short stories made great impressions: "O Σκέλεθρας" (The Skeleton), "To Μυστικό" (The Secret), "Η Κούκλα" (The doll), "Oι Υπηρέτες" (The Servants), and "Μεταθάνατο" (After death). Vlasis Gavriilidis hailed him in heavy type in his paper Akropolis as "this outstanding prose writer".

Egyptian, 1917

== Cyprus, Alexandria, and Cairo ==
But in May 1919, at the peak of his literary fame, Nicolaides suddenly left Athens. He took up residence for the next four years in his homeland of Cyprus. His plan was to publish there the new works he had ready, and to promote the island's cultural life, making it a "land of the muses". Such at least is the testimony of a young compatriot, Glafkos Alithersis, who had returned to Cyprus before him and was preparing the ground for his teacher by spreading publicity in his Limassol newspaper Aletheia (Truth). As soon as Nicolaides was back in Cyprus, he immediately published "The Blue flower" in Nicosia. But he found the intellectual climate there discouraging. He spent a few months in Stavrovouni Monastery, then moved on after some hesitation to Limassol. There he was welcomed by a band of enthusiastic young friends who were willing to campaign on behalf of art and literature, including Emilios Hourmouzios, Giannis Lefkis, Giangos Eliadis, Christodoulos Christodoulidis, Antonis Indianos, Dimitrios Demitriadis, the brothers Banos, and George Fasouliotis. Alithersis had meanwhile left for Alexandria. Nicolaides' presence in Limassol stimulated a flowering of intellectual life and creativity. Within three years, he published three books (one volume of lyric prose, one of short stories, and a novel—Το Στραβόξυλο (The Peevish Fellow). He staged two tragedies with girl students of the school where he taught painting. He produced "tableaux vivants" with remarkable success. He put on an exhibition of his own paintings (possibly the first such event in Cyprus). He gave private painting lessons and he undertook the artistic side of various events (such as flower festivals). Most important of all for Cyprus was the 1924 launch in Limassol (after he had left again for Egypt) of the island's first genuine literary periodical, Avge. Nicolaides and Alithersis from Egypt, and the other young people inspired by him, provided the nucleus for its contents.

In 1923, disappointed at the limited impact of his books in Cyprus, Nicolaides had returned to Alexandria, where he produced, painted the scenery, and provided music for a performance of the play The Blue Flower. Finally, around 1924, he settled in Cairo, which was to be his home for the rest of his life, although he took various trips from there to satisfy his zest for change, more frequently when his means and his health permitted it, less frequently as he grew older.

In Cairo he lived in the poor Arab quarters, where he associated with the lowest strata of the indigenous population. His intellectual and creative needs were satisfied both through his many-faceted work and through the society of a group of local Greeks who met on the premises of the sponge vendor and well known socialist Sakellaris Yiannikakis. Besides Yiannakakis himself and the lawyer Yiannis Lachovaris, the company consisted of young graduates of Cairo's Ambetions College with a strong artistic bent and interested in the pursuit of social justice and direct political action. These included Stratis Tsirkas, Theodosis Pierides, George Philippou Pierides, George Demos, Lambis Rappas, Stavros Karakasis and others. Some of these were to go on to achieve a pan-Hellenic reputation. Nicolaides' literary and artistic workshop gave a significant impetus to this evolution.

Nicolaides' relationships and contacts with the "cultural elite" in Alexandria were slight with Kavafis and his circle, but much closer with Timos Malakos, Maria Roussia, Alithersis—who had been his associate in Cyprus—and others. Contacts of every kind with his homeland continued undiminished. He visited Cyprus at intervals, contributed to Kypriaka Grammata (the Cypriot literary journal), published in Nicosia, corresponded with friends on the island, and provided financial assistance to his sister and her two daughters, one of whom he enabled to study at Harokopeion College in Athens. However, he had little further contact with Athens. He did not distribute his books there, and as a result was more or less forgotten, although he was remembered by a few friends and admirers.

Both in Alexandria and in Cairo, Nicolaides published several works: two volumes of short stories in Alexandria and three volumes of lyric prose and two novels in Cairo. He produced theatrical pieces in the Cairo Opera House and elsewhere and with amateur companies drawn from the Greek community. He painted. He gave painting lessons and exhibited in art exhibitions. He designed pavilions for the Gezira Exhibition Grounds at Cairo. He sketched the famous Tower of Tsanaklis in the Egyptian desert. He participated actively in peace movement rallies and other events in the Greek community (in favour of democracy in Greece and independence for Cyprus). He took a leading part in various artistic and other endeavours within the Greek community.

Nicolaides died in Cairo on 24 February 1956.

== Published works ==
- To Galazio Louloudi "The Blue Flower '. Lyric drama in three acts with an interlude. Nicosia, Cyprus, 1919
- Anthropines kai Anthines Zoes 'Lives of Men and Flowers'. Prose tragedy and short pieces. Book 1. Limassol, Cyprus, 1920
- Diegemata A' Short Stories Book 1. Cyprus (Lemassol) 1921,216 pages. (Containing Oi Iperetes ' The Servants ', I Pardali Gata ' The Leopard ', I Koukla ' The doll ' .Mesa stin Omichli ' In the Midst of the Mist ', Stimmeni Psychi ' A Crooked Soul ', matathanato ' After Death ', Paramoni tou Sotiros ' Eve of the Redeemer ', I kainourgia Mbolia ' Growing Up ', To Xeno Skili ' The strange Dog ').
- To Stravoxylo ' The Peevish Fellow '. Romance. How a Man may be formed. Limassol, Cyprus, 1922, re-issued 1923. Published by Sisyphus, Athens, 1980
- O Skelethras Diegimata B' 'The Skeleton Short Stories'. Book 2. Cyprus and Alexandria, 1924. 9 Containing: Anarrosi ' Convalescence ' O Skelethras ' The Skeleton ', I Periphania tis hygias ' Pride in Health ', O adexios 'The Clumsy One ', Oi Didymoi ' The Twins ', To Mystiko ' The Secret '). Books 1 and 2 were re-issued in one volume as O Skelethras kai alla Diegimata 'The Skeleton Man and other Short Stories' by Kedros, Athens, 1991
- I Kali Syntrophissa. Diegimata C. ' The kind Companion ' Short Stories Book 3. Cyprus and Alexandria 1929,172 pages. ( Containing: I Kali Synrtrophissa ' The Kind Companion ', To Xilino Podi ' The Wooden Leg ', I Skropha ' The Bitch ', Ego kai Ekoinos ' He and I ', Ta Koroida ' The Dupes', San Skili ' Like a Dog '.
- Anthropines kai Anthires Zoes ' Lives of Men and Flowers ' 2nd edition, The complete work. Cyprus and Cairo, 1938.
- O Chrysos Mythos ' The Golden Myth'. Cyprus and Cairo, 1938.
- Per' Apo to Kalo kai to Kako ' Beyond Good and Evil'. Cyprus and Cairo, 1940. Published by Oi Philoi tou Bibliou (Friends of Books ), Athens 1947, 166 pages, published by Kedros, Athens 1994
- Ta Tria Karfia ' The Three Nails ' Novel. Cyprus and Cairo, 1948. published by Kedros, Athens, 1992.
- To Biblio tou Monachou ' The Book of the Monk ' An Anthology. Nicosia 1946, (re-printed from the periodical Kypriaka Grammata 'Cypriot Letters') Cairo 1951. Published by Kedros, Athens, 1987
