= Canan Öztoprak =

Turkish Republic of Northern Cyprus Cabinet Minister

Canan Öztoprak (born 1955) is a Turkish Republic of Northern Cyprus Cabinet Minister appointed to the April 2005 TRNC Government of Prime Minister Ferdi Sabit Soyer. Her portfolios were National Education and Culture. She has been an active peace activist and founding member of the Cyprus Conflict Resolution Trainers Group. A psychologist, she graduated from Middle East Technical University in 1974.
