= Rolandos Liatsos =

Cypriot theater and film actor

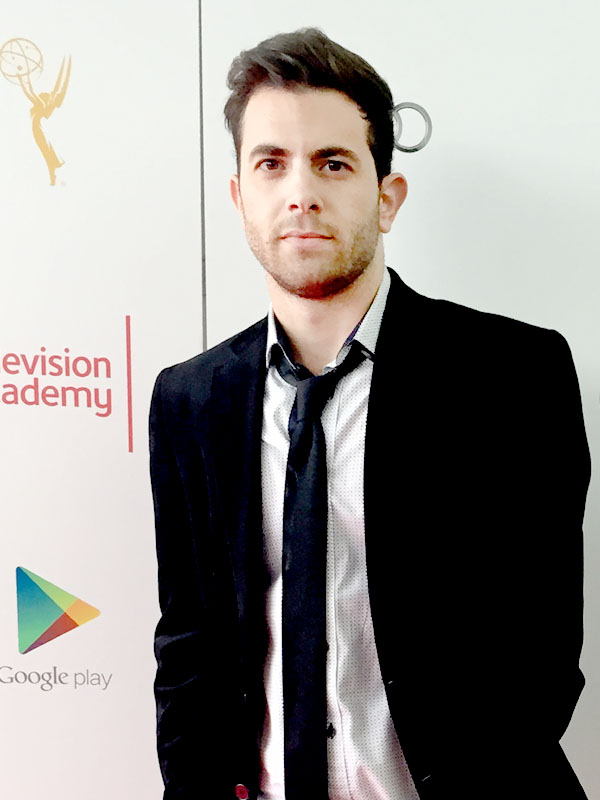

Rolandos Liatsos (born May 30, 1990, Cyprus) is a Cypriot stage actor.

== Career ==
He started his career at the age of 17 with Shakespeare’s play “A Midsummer Night's Dream” and made his breakthrough in Iakovos Kambanellis’ masterpiece “Stella With the Red Gloves.” After the success of this play Rolandos moved to Coventry where he starred in “The Tempest” and had his opera prima as a director and writer of “Unpublished by Alex.” Then he moved to Los Angeles to work with Academy Award Winner Milton Justice in the play “Woman in Mind.” Soon after he starred in Tennessee Williams’ play “The Rose Tattoo” directed by Yorgos Karamihos. With his theater experience focusing on various styles, including outdoor theater, experimental, Shakespeare, Physical theater, and Naturalism, he was able to bring to life Arturo Ui, a character based on Adolf Hitler in Bertolt Brecht's play "The Resistible Rise of Arturo Ui." In this political satire of the German writer, Rolandos gave his most successful performance yet.

A few of his latest film projects include "Even when I’m Sleeping,” "Social Norm," and "Three Hitmen," While in the U.K. he worked professionally with “The Fabularium” and KILN theater company.

== Filmography ==
- Social Norm, (2015) as Terry.
- Losses (short), (2015) as Brian.
- Here I Stand, (short), (2015) as Justin Miller.
- Three Hitmen (Short), (2014) as Jenson.
- Hills like White Elephant, (2014) as Michael Clark.
- We Love Cyprus (Documentary), (2013) as himself.
- Even When Im Sleeping, 2012 as Thomas.

== Theater work ==
- The Resistible Rise of Arturo Ui, (2014) as Arturo Ui,
- The Rose Tattoo, (2014) as Alvaro Mangiacavallo,
- Hurlyburly, (2013) as Eddie,
- Woman in Mind, (2013) as Rick,
- "Unpublished" by Alex, (2012) as Alex.
- The Grim Tales, (2011. 2012).
- End of The World, (2011)
- The Tempest, (2010) as Caliban.
- DWEEB, (2010).
- Arabian Nights, (2009).
- Stella With the Red Gloves, (2009).
- A Midsummer Night's Dream, (2007).

== Education ==
- in 2012 Rolandos Liatsos graduated with a BA in Theater and Professional Practice, From Coventry University, Coventry, UK.
- In 2014 Rolandos Liatsos graduated from the 2 year Conservatory at Stella Adler Academy.
