= Panagiotis Sierepeklis =

Cypriot volleyball player (born 1983)

Panagiotis Sierepeklis (born 10 July 1983, Paphos, Cyprus) is a Cypriot volleyball player, currently playing for Pafiakos. He is an Outside Hitter.

He started his career with Pafiakos as setter, making his first appearance for the senior squad during the 1997–1998 season however his real talent became apparent during 2000–01.

After Sierepeklis received many prizes. Cyprus biggest newspaper, recognized him as one of the best talent player in Cyprus.

He then moved to the Greek side Mega Alexandro in 2004, Aeto 2005 and Epikouro 2006–2007. On 31 July 2008 Pafiakos announced the signing of Sierepeklis (free transfer).
