= Lycourgos Kyprianou =

- Born: 1954 or 1955 (age 70–71)
- Occupation: Businessman

Lycourgos Kyprianou (born 1954/1955) is a Cypriot businessman, and the former chairman of GlobalSoft and AremisSoft Corp. Together with his business partner, Roys Poyiadjis, he has been charged with defrauding investors of $565 million. He fled to Cyprus, where he remains, and in 2018, the Cyprus justice ministry confirmed that no Cypriot has been extradited to the US.

== Fraud charges ==
In 2002, Kyprianou was charged with securities fraud and money laundering by the US authorities. The fraud was uncovered in 2001, after which Kyprianou and Poyiadjis fled to Cyprus.

In July 2005, a Nicosia court ordered a global freeze on Kyprianou's assets following an alleged US$565 million perpetrated by Kyprianou and Poyiadjis on the shareholders of AremisSoft. The previous month, Poyiadjis agreed to repay $200 million to investors. Kyprianou has denied all charges.

Kyprianou remains in Cyprus, and in 2018, the Cyprus justice ministry confirmed that no Cypriot has ever been extradited to the US.

== Personal life ==
In 2015, his daughter was married at his "palatial residence" in Tseri, Kyproulla.

== Publications ==
Kyprianou, L., 1980, Shape classification in Computer-Aided Design, Ph.D. Dissertation, Cambridge University.
