= Stasinus =

Semi-legendary early Greek poet

Stasinus (Ancient Greek: Στασῖνος, romanized: Stasînos) of Cyprus was a semi-legendary early Greek poet. He is best known for his lost work Cypria, which was one of the poems belonging to the Epic Cycle that narrated the War of Troy.

The Cypria, presupposing an acquaintance with the events of the Homeric poem, confined itself to what preceded the Iliad, and has been described as an introduction. The poem contained an account of the Judgement of Paris, the elopement of Helen, the abandonment of Philoctetes on the island of Lemnos, the landing of the Achaeans on the coast of Asia Minor, and the first engagement before Troy. Proclus, in his Chrestomathia, gave an outline of the poem (preserved in Photius, cod. 239).

Plato puts quotes from Stasinus' works in the mouth of Socrates, in his dialogue Euthyphro.

== Surviving fragments ==
- Of Zeus, the author and creator of all these things,/ You will not tell: for where there is fear there is also reverence. - fragment cited by Socrates in the Euthyphro dialogue

== Sources ==
- F.G. Welcker, Der epische Cyclus, oder Die homerischen Dichter Bonn : E. Weber, 1849-65.
- D.B. Monro, Homer's Odyssey, books XIII-XXIV Appendix to his edition of Odyssey, xiii–xxiv. (1901)
- Thomas W Allen, "The Epic Cycle," in Classical Quarterly 2.1 (January 1908:54-64).
