= Kypria festival =

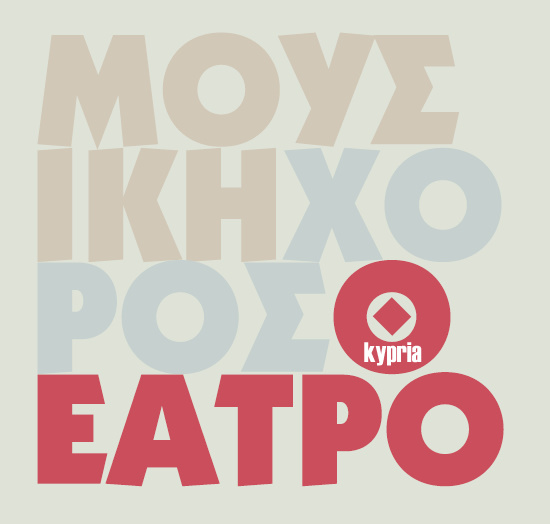
Kypria International of the arts in Cyprus

Kypria is an annual festival staged at various venues across Cyprus in September and October. It is organised by the Cyprus Ministry of Education and Culture. The festival brings to Cyprus some of the world's best artists in the fields of music, dance and performance art. Art and photography exhibitions, opera and ballet are also included. The festival started in 1990.
