= Neşe Yaşın =

Turkish Cypriot poet and author

- Born: February 12, 1959 (age 67); Nicosia, Cyprus
- Education: University of Cyprus
- Occupations: Poet, Author

Neşe Yaşın (born February 12, 1959), is a Turkish Cypriot poet and author.

== Early life ==
Neşe Yaşın was born in Nicosia to Turkish-Cypriot parents. Her father is the accomplished poet and author Özker Yaşın and she is the sister of the award-winning poet Mehmet Yaşın. After graduating from Türk Maarif Koleji, Yaşın completed her undergraduate education at Middle East Technical University where she studied sociology. She then graduated from the University of Cyprus.

== Career ==
She has been an active peace activist from a very young age and member of the Cyprus Conflict Resolution Trainers Group, which in 1995 proposed 15 projects to promote peace and reconciliation on the island and presented in the Cyprus Peace Bazaar. Yaşın mainly writes in Turkish although a considerable number of her works of prose have been translated into Greek and English. Also her poetry has been translated to 20 languages, published in literary magazines and anthologies. She frequently writes and presents papers on peace and reunification of her "beloved island" Cyprus. One such paper that gathered attention was the one presented at World Conference on Culture in Stockholm in 1998.

Yaşın directed and presented a literary program called 41st Room at "CYBC" radio (1992-2007) and the program Peace Garden (2001-2003) at "ASTRA" radio. She is currently writing weekly columns for "BirGün" newspaper (Turkey) and "Yenidüzen" newspaper (Cyprus).

In 2006, she made history in Cyprus when she ran for a position in the parliament of Cyprus after the Cypriot government passed a law allowing Turkish-Cypriots residing in the south to vote in general elections for non Turkish-Cypriot candidates. She became the first Turkish-Cypriot to participate in elections since the departure of the Turkish-Cypriot candidates in 1963.

Yaşın currently teaches at the University of Cyprus at the Department of Turkish and Middle Eastern Studies.

Since the mid 1980s, she has been living and working in south Nicosia.

== Bibliography ==
- Hyacinth and Narcissus, 1979, Cem Publications, Istanbul
- Tears of Wars, 1980, Yeni Turku Publications, Istanbul
- Doors, 1992, Cem Publications, Istanbul
- Which Half, 1995, Thegona, Nicosia
- The Moon is Made of Love, 2000, Gendas Publications, Istanbul ISBN 9753083009
- Secret History of Sad Girls, 2002, İletisim Publications, Istanbul ISBN 9750500962
- Chambers of Memory, 2005, Dunya Publications, Istanbul
- Selected poems, 2008, Amargi Publications, Istanbul

== Awards ==
- Artist of the Year-Special Award (Republic of Cyprus), 1978
- Artist of the Year (Turkish Bank), 1980
- Necati Taşkın Foundation Award, 1993
- POGO-Woman Day Honorary Award, 1997
- Anthias-Pierides Cultural Award, 1998
