= Mehmet Yaşın =

Turkish Cypriot poet and author

- Born: 1958 (age 67–68); Yenişehir, Nicosia, Cyprus
- Education: Ankara University, Istanbul University, University of Birmingham, University of Middlesex
- Occupations: Poet, author
- Writing career
- Notable awards: Academy Poetry Award; A. Kadir Award; Memet Fuat Criticism/Inquisition Award

Mehmet Yaşın (born 1958) is a Turkish Cypriot poet and author.

== Biography ==
Mehmet Yaşın was born in the Yenişehir neighborhood of Nicosia to Turkish-Cypriot parents. His father is the accomplished poet and author Özker Yaşın, and his sister the well-known poet Neşe Yaşın.

He left Cyprus at the age of 17, and went to study in Turkey, where he studied at the Ankara University and Istanbul University. He received postgraduate education at the University of Birmingham and University of Middlesex, and was also educated in France and the United States. He speaks Turkish, English and Greek.

His first poem was published in 1979 at the Turkish journal Sanat Emeği ("Art Work"), and his poems received attention in the journals Yazko Edebiyat, Adam Sanat and Defter in the 1980s. His first book of poetry, Sevgilim Ölü Asker ("My Darling, Dead Soldier") received critical acclaim and was awarded the Academy Poetry Award and the A. Kadir Award, but it was banned due to its "dangerous content". He published his first novel, Your Kinsman Pisces, in 1994.

His work often features the theme of loss, as he was heavily influenced by the loss of the cosmopolitan quality of his neighborhood, Yenişehir, and the destruction of their house in the 1974 conflict. In 2002, he published poems in the Karamanli Turkish language, at a period when he withdrew from publicity. He published the book An Anthology of Cypriot Poetry, where he translated Cypriot poems from the Phoenician and Lusignan eras for the first time, with the aid of historians and archaeologists. The book received the Memet Fuat Criticism/Inquisition Award. At the time, he delivered lessons of Turkish Cypriot literature, comparative literature and theory of translation in northern and southern Cyprus.

His works have been translated to more than 20 languages and have been set to music in Cyprus, Turkey, the UK and the Netherlands.

== Bibliography ==
- My Love The Dead Soldier, 1984
- Ladder of Light, 1986
- Pathos, 1990
- The Armchair of the Promise, 1993
- Your Kinsman Pisces, 1994
- Anthology of Turkish-Cypriot Poetry: 18th to 20th centuries, 1994
- Poeturka, 1995
- To Repair a Daydream, 1998
- Anthology of Early Cypriot Poetry: 9th century BC to 18th century AD, 1999
- Step-Mothertongue – From Nationalism to Multiculturalism: Literatures of Cyprus, Greece and Turkey, 2000
- Don't Go Back To Kyrenia, 2001
- His Name is on the List of the Missing, 2002
- The Yellow Bird, 2007
- Heart-stopped in Time, 2009
- The Child that Fled His Home, 2013
- Yellow Amber, 2014
