= George Philippou Pierides =

George Philippou Pierides (Greek: Γιώργος Φιλίππου Πιερίδης) (9 August 1904 – December 1999) was a Cypriot writer, celebrated for his cycle of short stories later collected as "Tetralogy of the Times" (Η Τετραλογία των Καιρών).

== His life ==
Pierides was born in the village of Dali in Cyprus in 1904. He grew up and lived in Egypt where he worked in the cotton industry. After World War II, he returned and settled in Cyprus in 1947 where he worked primarily as a librarian in the Municipal Library of Famagusta and the Library of Phaneromeni in Nicosia. His writings reflect his observations and experiences in both Egypt ("The Cotton Growers") and Cyprus ("Tetralogy of the Times").

== His work ==
=== Tetralogy of the Times ===
This collection of short stories, published in Greek by the Bank of Cyprus Cultural Foundation. Each group of short stories deals with a different period in Cypriot history, as seen through the lives of ordinary people from various walks of life and social positions in the Greek Cypriot community. In historical order (the original short stories were not written in strict chronological sequence but were published as such within "Tetralogy") the four sections are:

- "Times Immovable" which deals with the period before the 1955 Greek Cypriot uprising.
- "Times of Difficulty" which deals with the period between 1955 and 1959.
- "Times of Affluence" which deals with the period of the first Cypriot republic (1960–1974) and
- "Times of Suffering" which examines the reactions and experiences coming out of the 1974 coup and the Turkish military intervention.
