= Cypria =

C. 7th century BCE epic poem

- by Stasinus
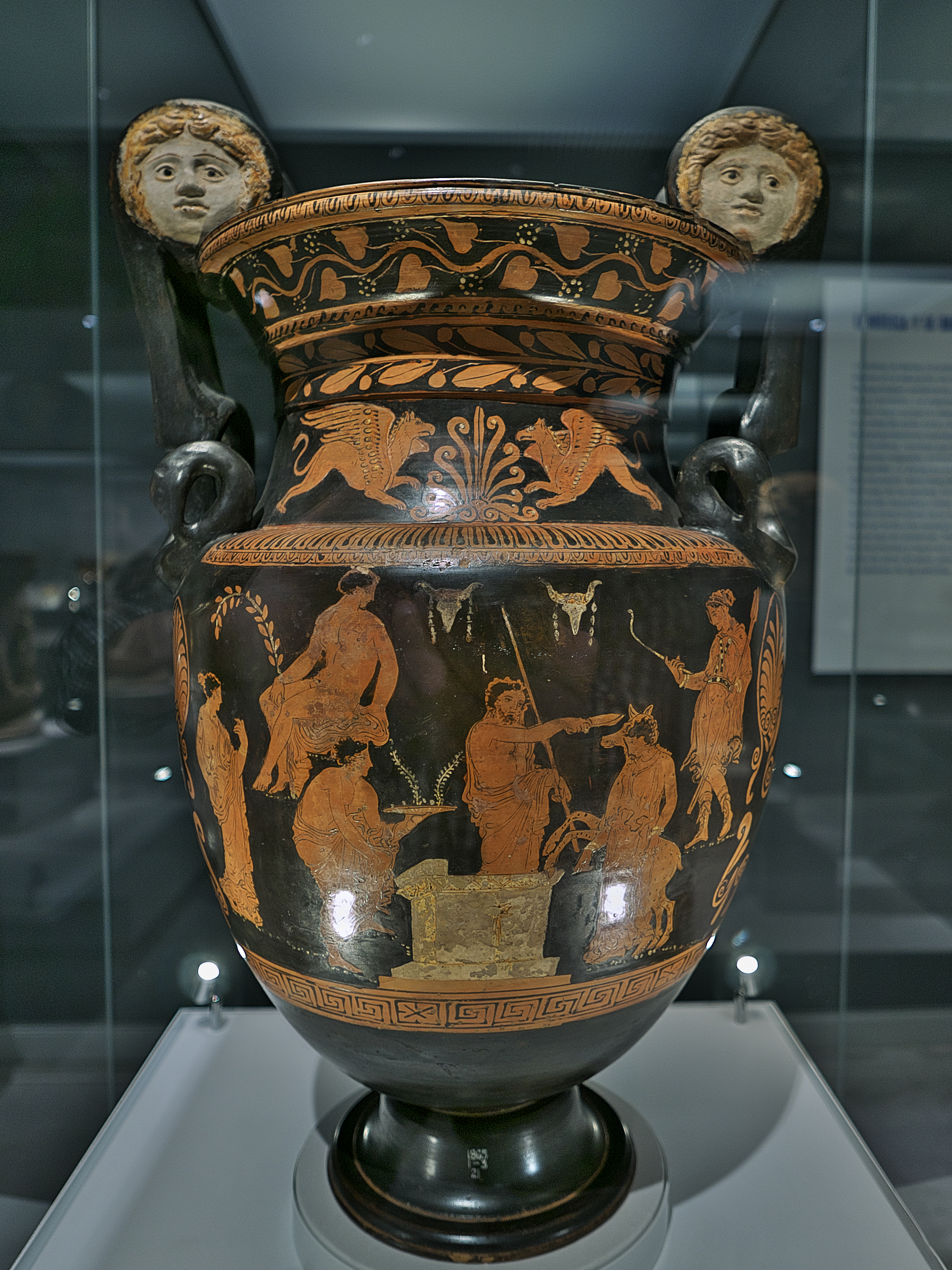
- Sacrifice of Iphigenia on a red-figure Apulian volute krater c. 370-350 BC, British Museum
- Written: c. 7th century BCE
- Country: Ancient Greece
- Language: Ancient Greek
- Genre: Epic poetry
- Followed by: Iliad

The Cypria (/ˈsɪpri.ə/; Ancient Greek: Κύπρια, romanized: Kýpria; Latin: Cypria) is a lost epic poem of ancient Greek literature, which has been attributed to Stasinus and was quite well known in classical antiquity and fixed in a received text, but which subsequently was lost to view. It was part of the Epic Cycle, which told the entire history of the Trojan War in epic hexameter verse. The story of the Cypria comes chronologically at the beginning of the Epic Cycle, and is followed by that of the Iliad; the composition of the two was apparently in the reverse order. The poem comprised eleven books of verse in epic dactylic hexameters.

== Date and authorship ==
The Cypria, in the written form in which it was known in classical Greece, was probably composed in the late seventh century BCE, but there is much uncertainty. The Cyclic Poets, as the translator of Homerica Hugh G. Evelyn-White noted, "were careful not to trespass upon ground already occupied by Homer," one of the reasons for dating the final, literary form of Cypria as post-Homeric, in effect a "prequel". "The author of the Kypria already regarded the Iliad as a text. Any reading of the Kypria will show it preparing for events for (specifically) the Iliad in order to refer back to them, for instance the sale of Lycaon to Lemnos or the kitting out of Achilles with Briseis and Agamemnon with Chryseis". A comparison can be made with the Aethiopis, also lost, but which even in its quoted fragments is more independent of the Iliad as text.

The stories contained in the Cypria, on the other hand, were fixed much earlier than that, and the same problems of dating oral traditions associated with the Homeric epics also apply to the Cypria. Many or all of the stories in the Cypria were known to the composer(s) of the Iliad and Odyssey. The Cypria, in presupposing an acquaintance with the events of the Homeric poem, in the received view thus formed a kind of introduction to the Iliad though there is an overlap in events from the death of Palamedes, including the catalogue of Trojan allies. J. Marks observes that "Indeed, the junction would be seamless if the Kypria simply ended with the death of Palamedes."

The title Cypria, associating the epic with Cyprus, demanded some explanation: the epic was said in one ancient tradition to have been given by Homer as a dowry to his son-in-law, a Stasinus of Cyprus mentioned in no other context; there was apparently an allusion to this in a lost Nemean ode by Pindar. Some later writers repeated the story. It did at least serve to explain why the Cypria was attributed by some to Homer and by others to Stasinus. Others, however, ascribed the poem to Hegesias (or Hegesinus) of Salamis in Cyprus or to Cyprias of Halicarnassus (see Cyclic Poets).

It is possible that the "Trojan Battle Order" (the list of Trojans and their allies, of Iliad 2.816–876, which forms an appendix to the Catalogue of Ships) is abridged from that in the Cypria, which was known to contain in its final book a list of the Trojan allies.

== Manuscript tradition ==
In current critical editions only about fifty lines survive of the Cypria's original text, quoted by others. For the content we are almost entirely dependent on a prose summary of the Cyclic epics contained in the Chrestomathy attributed to an unknown "Proclus" (possibly to be identified with the 2nd-century AD grammarian Eutychius Proclus, or else with an otherwise unknown 5th-century grammarian). Many other passing references give further minor indications of the poem's storyline.

== Content ==
What follows embeds reports of known content of the Cypria in a retelling of the known events leading up to the anger of Achilles. Details about the Cypria's contents are known through few fragments and a summary by Proclus.

The poem narrates the origins of the Trojan War and its first events. It begins with the decision of Zeus, in collaboration with Themis, to relieve the Earth of the burden of population through war, a decision with familiar Mesopotamian parallels. During the wedding of Peleus and Thetis, the goddess of discord Eris instigates a feud among the goddesses Athena, Hera, and Aphrodite on account of their beauty. Hermes escorts the three to Mount Ida to be judged by Paris (also called Alexander). Paris awards the victory to Aphrodite after she promises him marriage to Helen, the daughter of Zeus and Nemesis (raised by Tyndareus and Leda).

Then Paris builds his ships at Aphrodite's suggestion, and Helenus foretells the future to him; Aphrodite orders Aeneas to sail with him, while Cassandra prophesies the outcome. In Lacedaemon the Trojans are entertained by the sons of Tyndareus, Castor and Pollux, and by Menelaus too, who then sets sail for Crete, ordering Helen to furnish the guests with all they require. Aphrodite brings Helen and Paris together, and he takes her and her dowry back to his home of Troy with an episode at Sidon, which Paris and his men successfully storm. In the meantime Castor and Pollux, while stealing the cattle of Idas and Lynceus, are caught and killed: Zeus gives them immortality that they share every other day.

Iris informs Menelaus about the events back in Sparta, who returns to plan an expedition against Troy with his brother Agamemnon. He visits Nestor who tells him the stories of how Epopeus was destroyed after seducing the daughter of Lycus, Oedipus, the madness of Heracles, and the story of Theseus and Ariadne. Then they start gathering the leaders all over Greece; Odysseus feigns madness to avoid sailing, but on the advice of Palamedes they kidnap his son Telemachus, forcing him to join. The leaders then gather at Aulis for a sacrifice, where they witness the snake and sparrows omen; Calchas foretells the future to them.

They set sail and reach the city of Teuthras in Mysia which they sack, having mistaken it for Troy. The hero Telephus comes to the city's rescue and is wounded by Achilles. The fleet is scattered by storm, and Achilles puts in at Skyros where he marries Deidameia, the daughter of Lycomedes. He then heals Telephus (who arrives at Argos following an oracle), so that he might be their guide to Troy. Afterwards, the Achaeans muster for a second time at Aulis, where Agamemnon kills a deer during a hunt and offends Artemis by bragging that his hunting skills surpass hers. The goddess in anger sends them bad weather, stranding them at Aulis. Calchas persuades them to sacrifice Agamemnon's daughter Iphigenia in order toobtain safe passage, and she is fetched over under the pretence of marriage to Achilles. Artemis, however, snatches her away, substituting a deer on the altar, and transports her to the land of the Tauri, making her immortal.

Next they sail as far as Tenedos, where while they are feasting, Philoctetes is bitten by a snake and is left behind in Lemnos due to the wound's foul odor. Here, too, Achilles quarrels with Agamemnon because he was invited too late. A first landing at the Troad is repulsed by the Trojans, and Protesilaus is killed by Hector. Achilles then kills Cycnus, the son of Poseidon, and drives the Trojans back. The Greeks take up their dead and send envoys to the Trojans demanding the surrender of Helen and the stolen treasure. When the Trojans refuse, the Greeks first attempt an assault upon the city, and then lay waste to the surrounding countryside.

Achilles desires to see Helen, so Aphrodite and Thetis contrive a meeting between them. The Achaeans next desire to return home, but are restrained by Achilles, who afterwards drives off the cattle of Aeneas, sacks neighbouring cities, and kills Troilus. Patroclus carries away Lycaon to Lemnos and sells him as a slave, and out of the spoils Achilles receives Briseis as a prize, and Agamemnon Chryseis. Then, following the death of Palamedes, comes the plan of Zeus to relieve the Trojans by detaching Achilles from the Hellenic confederacy, and a catalogue of the Trojan allies.

== Reception ==
The Cypria was considered to be a lesser work than Homer's two masterpieces: Aristotle criticised it for its lack of narrative cohesion and focus. It was rather a catalogue of events than a unified story.

== Editions ==
- Online editions (English translation):
  - Fragments of the Cypria translated by H.G. Evelyn-White, 1914 (public domain)
  - Fragments of complete Epic Cycle translated by H.G. Evelyn-White, 1914; Project Gutenberg edition
  - Proclus' summary of the Epic Cycle, omitting the Telegony translated by G. Nagy, 2000
- Print editions (Greek):
  - A. Bernabé 1987, Poetarum epicorum Graecorum testimonia et fragmenta pt. 1 (Leipzig)
  - M. Davies 1988, Epicorum Graecorum fragmenta (Göttingen)
- Print editions (Greek with English translation):
  - M.L. West 2003 (ed., trans.), Greek Epic Fragments from the seventh to the fifth centuries BC Loeb Classical Library (Harvard University Press, Cambridge, MA) pp. 64–107 ISBN 0-674-99605-4 Online

== See also ==
- Eris (mythology)
- Apple of Discord
