= Kyriakos Charalambides =

Cypriot poet

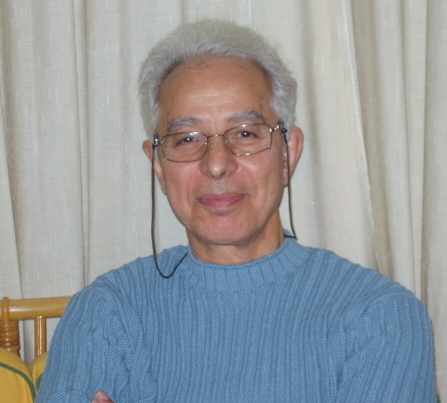
- Born: 31 January 1940 (age 86); Achna, Famagusta, Cyprus
- Occupation: Poet

Kyriakos Charalambides (Greek: Κυριάκος Χαραλαμπίδης, Kyriacos Charalambides) is one of the most renowned and celebrated living Cypriot poets. His poetry, essays, translations, and critical analysis celebrate the ideas of Western civilisation, expressed through the language and history of Greek culture. His poetic opus adds to the tradition established by such modern Greek poets as Constantine P. Cavafy, Giorgos Seferis and Odysseas Elytis. His poetry though holds steadfastly to the Greek Cypriot linguistic register.

== Biography ==
He was born on January 31, 1940, in Achna, in the Famagusta District of Cyprus. He studied history and archaeology at the University of Athens (1958–64), drama at the Drama School of the Greek National Theater (1962–63) and radio in Munich (1972–73). After four years as a high school Greek literature teacher in Cyprus, he was appointed to the Cyprus Broadcasting Corporation where he served until 1997 as Head of Radio Programmes. In 2008, he has been elected by the Senate of the University of Cyprus to serve on its Council.

== Works ==
He is the author of ten books of poetry:

- First Source [Πρώτη Πηγή], Athens, 1961.
- The ignorance of the water, with an introduction from Takis K. Papatsonis [Η άγνοια του νερού, με πρόλογο Τάκη K. Παπατσώνη], Icarus: Athens, 1967
- The vase with designs [Το αγγείο με τα σχήματα], Nicosia, 1973.
- The Achaeans’ Shore Αχαιών Ακτή, Nicosia, 1977; 2nd edition, Agra: Athens, 2003.
- Famagusta Regal Capital Αμμόχωστος Βασιλεύουσα, Hermes: Athens, 1982; Agra: Athens 1997.
- Dome Θόλος, Hermes: Athens, 1989; 1991; Agra: Athens, 1998.
- Meta-history Μεθιστορία, Agra: Athens, 1995; 2000.
- Dokimin Δοκίμιν, Agra: Athens, 2000.
- Aiyaloussa Visited Αιγιαλούσις Επίσκεψις, Agra: Athena, 2003.
- Quince Apple Κυδώνιον Μήλον, Agra: Athens, 2006.

== Awards ==
Three of his books were awarded the First State Prize for Poetry (Cyprus). His book "Tholos" (Dome) was awarded the Athens Academy Prize (1989) and his collection "Meta-history" was awarded the Greek National Prize for Poetry (1996). In 1997 he published his own translation and introduction to Romanos the Melodist's "Three Hymns," which was awarded the Hellenic Society of Literary Translators Prize. He is also the recipient of the 1998 Cavafy Prize (Egypt). In 2003 he was awarded the Costa and Eleni Ourani Award by the Athens Academy for his entire work in poetry. In 2006, he was awarded the Cultural Contribution Award of Teucros Anthias - Thodosis Pierides by the Cypriot political party, AKEL. In 2007, he was awarded the Literary, Arts and Sciences Prize of the Republic of Cyprus.

== Translations of Charalambides's work ==
Charalambides's work has been translated in many languages in various monographs:

- "Selected Poems" translated in English by Greg Delanty (Southworld Editions, the Munster Literature Center, Cork, Ireland, 2005.
- "Dome" translated in English by John Milides (National Center for Hellenic Studies and Research, La Trobe University, Australia 2002.
- "Hier, wo das Wunder nock Wirkt" translated in German from Hans Eideneier (Romiosini, Cologne 2000).
- "Methistoria" translated in French by Andreas Hadjisavvas with Francoise Becker, Michel Blanc and Francoise Gabenisch (Edition Praxandre, Besançon, France, 2007).
- "Ordens tyranni och andra dikter" translated in Swedish from Anna Maria Gull (Atlantis, Sweden, 2008, forthcoming).
- "Myth and History" translated in English by David Connoly (Nostos Books, Minneapolis, USA - 2010).

== Books on Charalambides's work ==
- Michalis Tsianikas, "The name of Famagusta: A critical approach to 'Famagusta Regal Capital" Indiktos: Athens, 2003.
- Thedosis Pylarinos, "Metahistory" Herodotus: Athens, 2007.
- Special edition of the journal "Porfyras" issue 124, Corfu, July–September, 2007.
- Special edition of the journal "Literary Themes" Themata Logotechnias issue 12, July - October, 1999.
- Presentation in journal "The word", issue 163, May - July 2001.

Moreover, his work has been set to music by Chrysostomos Stamoulis, Notis Mavroudes, Michalis Christodoulides, Marios Tokas, Savvas Savva, Marios Meletiou and George Kalogyrou.

== Reviews ==
Reviews of his work are published regularly in the Greek press. The most recent reviews include:

- Review of his book Quince Apple in Greek daily Kathimerini, 21 January 2007
- Review of his book Quince Apple in Greek daily Ta Nea, 15 July 2006
