= Culture of Northern Cyprus =

The culture of Northern Cyprus is the pattern of human activity and symbolism associated with Northern Cyprus and Turkish Cypriots. It features significant elements influenced by or developed upon the culture of Turkey, but combines these elements with a unique Cypriot approach and local traditions (in common with Greek Cypriots), as well as several other influences, such as the British and contemporary western cultures.

== Music ==
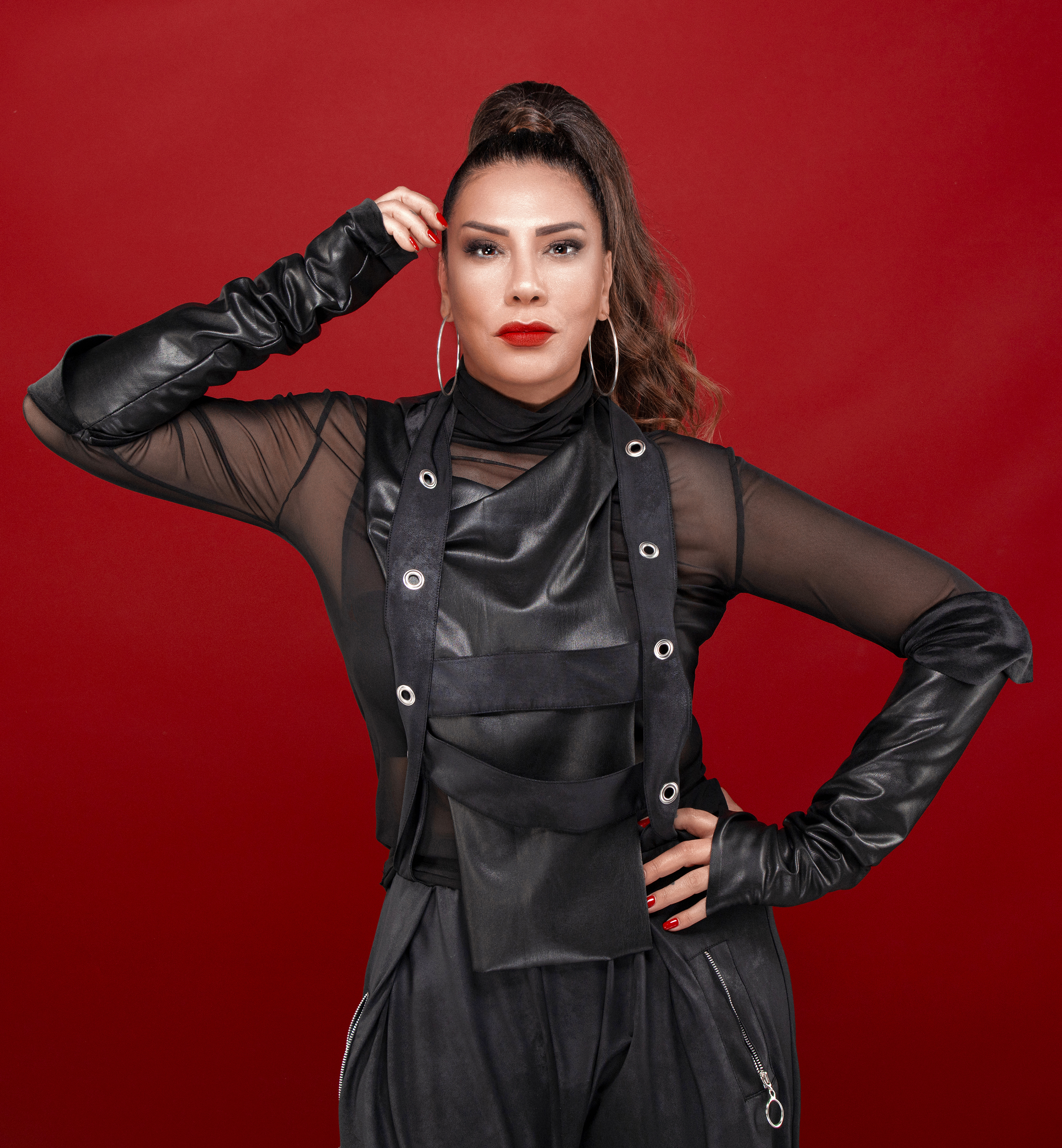
Işın Karaca

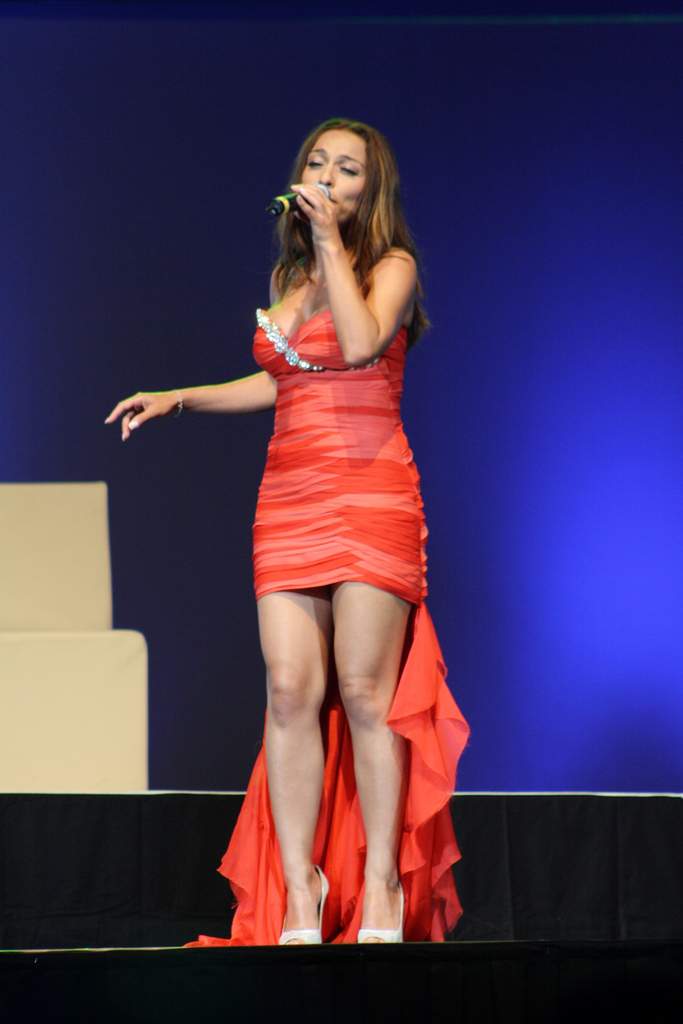
Ziynet Sali is a Turkish Cypriot pop singer famous in Turkey and Northern Cyprus.

=== Contemporary music ===
Turkish Cypriot cities and towns regularly organize festivals that include performances of local and international singers and bands. Some Turkish Cypriot singers, such as Ziynet Sali and Işın Karaca, have achieved fame in Turkey. The Turkish Cypriot band Sıla 4 produced music that is considered essential for the Turkish Cypriot identity, and also acquired fame in Turkey. Rock and pop music are popular with the public in Northern Cyprus, important singers and bands include SOS and Fikri Karayel.

=== Folk music ===
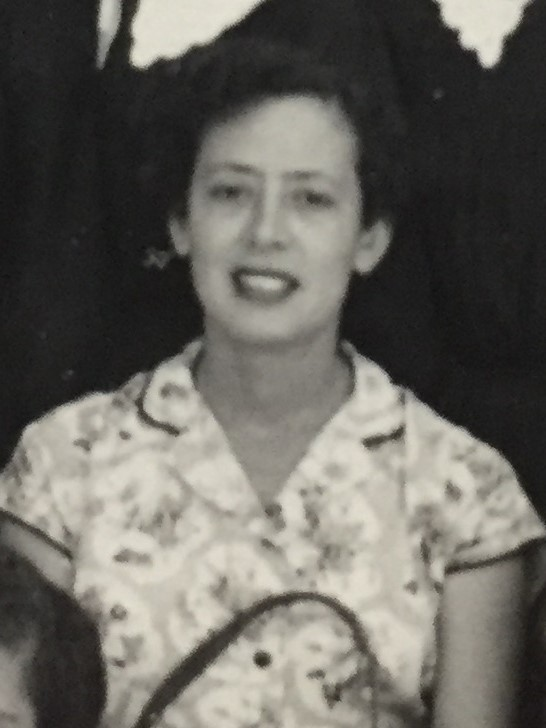
Kamran Aziz, pictured here in 1954, was a leading Turkish Cypriot composer

Turkish Cypriot folk music consists of a rich variety of local tunes, influenced by the mainland Turkish music to a limited extent. Historically, it was shaped around the tradition of weddings, the primary social gatherings at the time. Violin, goblet drum, known locally as "darbuka", zurna and other drums were heavily used in these gatherings, and a large number of traditional songs developed based on this legacy. Many traditional songs are shared with the Greek Cypriot community. The songs were not only used for entertainment at weddings, but also at other special occasions such as bayrams, circumcision ceremonies and wrestling matches, when a band, called "ince saz" ("shrill ensemble") consisting of a darbuka player, violinist, tambourine and cymbals players would be assembled. The name was given with reference to the shrill and loud sounds of the instruments that could be heard from miles away, signalling entertainment. In the distant past, when the society was gender-segregated, blind violinists would be hired to come and play at women's quarters as men were not allowed to see them, these violinists frequented the Kumarcilar Han in Nicosia.

Turkish Cypriot folk music can be categorized into two groups: the türküs and "oyun havaları", music that was meant to accompany folk dances and entertainment during weddings. Among the türküs, some important ones are "Dillirga", "Kebapçıların şişi" ("the skewers of the kebab makers") and "Portakal atışalım" ("let's throw each other oranges").

Whilst Kamran Aziz mostly composed non-folkloric pieces, many of her compositions are now considered to be part of the Turkish Cypriot folk music canon. She is also considered to have started Turkish Cypriot pop music in its modern sense.

=== Classical music ===
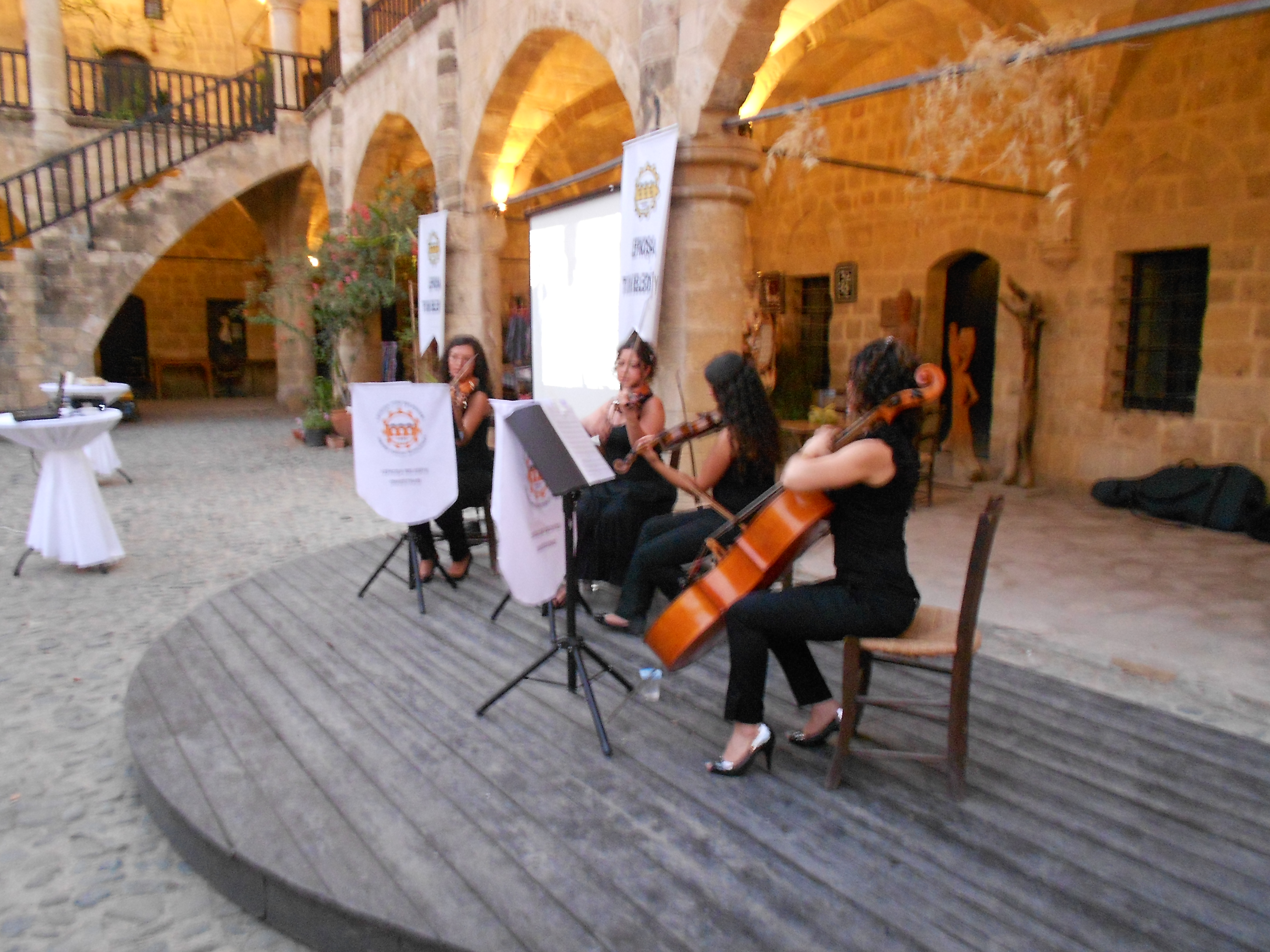
Musicians from the Lefkoşa Municipal Orchestra performing in Büyük Han

In Northern Cyprus, both western and Ottoman styles of classical music are performed.

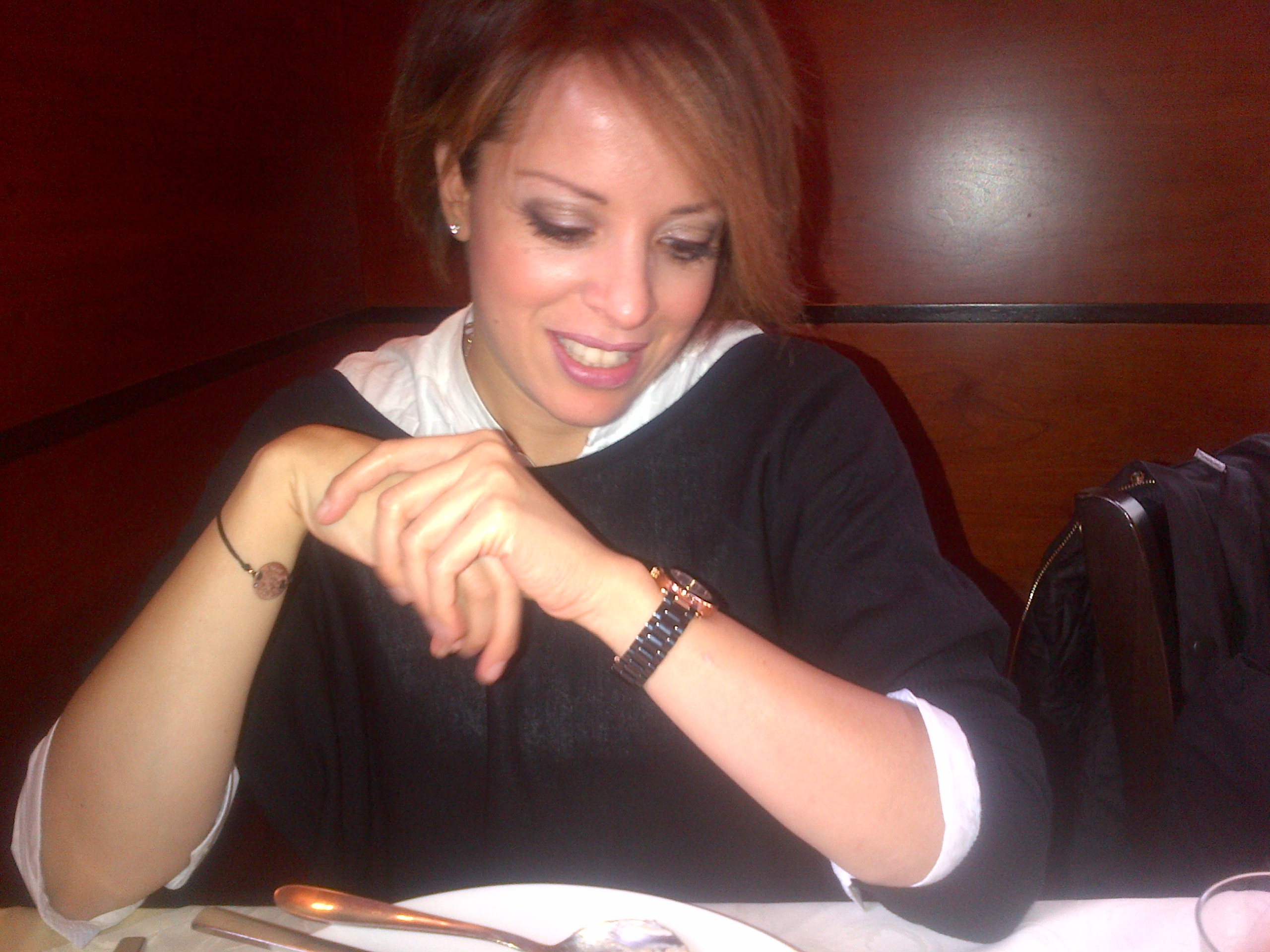
Rüya Taner, Turkish Cypriot classical pianist

The Northern Cyprus State Symphony Orchestra was established in 1975, but the efforts to develop and promote it never met with success. In 2014, the Presidential Symphony Orchestra was established. It was initially intended to consist of 39 musicians, but delivered its first concert in the Bellapais Abbey in Kyrenia with 61 participating musicians, all of whom were Turkish Cypriots. The Bellapais Abbey hosts international festivals of classical music, including the Bellapais International Festival of Classical Music, and is considered in important platform of classical music. The International Northern Cyprus Music Festival is also an important musical event, held in September and October in the Bellapais Abbey, ancient city of Salamis and the Kyrenia Castle, holding concerts and shows of classical music, tango, symphonic rock, chamber orchestras, flamenco and Romani music. North Nicosia has its own Lefkoşa Municipal Orchestra that performs at open spaces, such as parks and squares, and is also home to the annual Walled City Jazz Festival. Rüya Taner is a Turkish Cypriot pianist who has achieved international acclaim.

The first Ottoman classical music establishment in Cyprus was founded in 1924 and was called Darül-Elhan. It was involved in education and performances, and dissolved in 1953 to be replaced by several groups. In 1985, the State Turkish Music Choir was established to officially institutionalize the activities. The choir is still active and frequently delivers concerts throughout Northern Cyprus.

== Dance ==
=== Folk dances ===
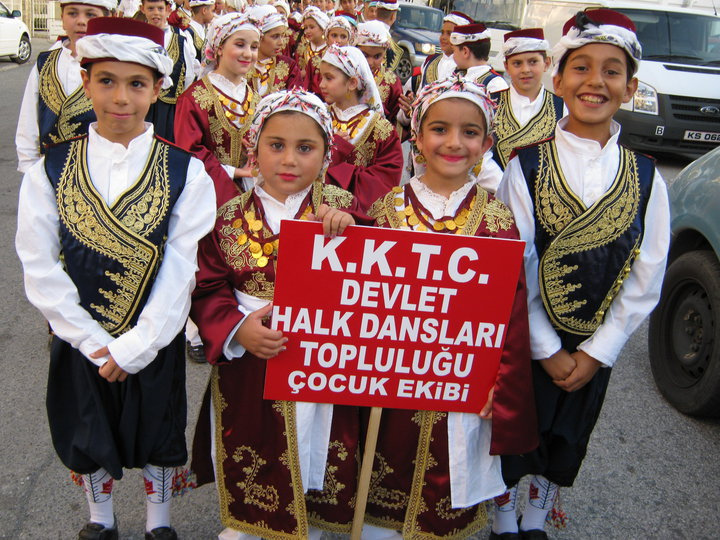
Turkish Cypriot children, dressed in traditional clothing, preparing for a folk-dance show

Turkish Cypriot culture also incorporates a great diversity of folk dances with various influences, including different versions of karsilamas, çiftetelli and zeybek. There is no definite number of Turkish Cypriot folk dances and dances have different names and styles in different regions. Dances could be exclusively for men, women or for mixed groups These folk dances were a crucial part of the weddings in the past, along with folk music. and carry motifs of traditional entertainment, lifestyles and important occasions. A folk dance tradition that still exists among Turkish Cypriots is the "testi oyunu", where an earthen pot is filled with coins, almonds, raisins and candies before weddings by the mother and in-laws of the bride-to-be and young women dance around the pot and finally break it during the dance. The scattered candies are then picked up by children.

Since the 1980s, there has been a revival of the traditional folk dances in Northern Cyprus due to the intensive activities of the folk dance groups established by the Ministry of Education, municipalities and various associations. This has led to the revival of previously forgotten traditions such as the henna night dances and also paved the way for the mixed practice by men and women of dances traditionally associated with one sex only, such as "testi oyunu". Turkish Cypriot folk dance groups practice their traditions in festivals in several European countries. Since the 1980s, the country has also organized international folk dance festivals and competitions, in Trikomo/İskele and Gönyeli. The first folk dance and folklore association in Northern Cyprus, HASDER, was founded in 1977.

=== Other styles of dance ===
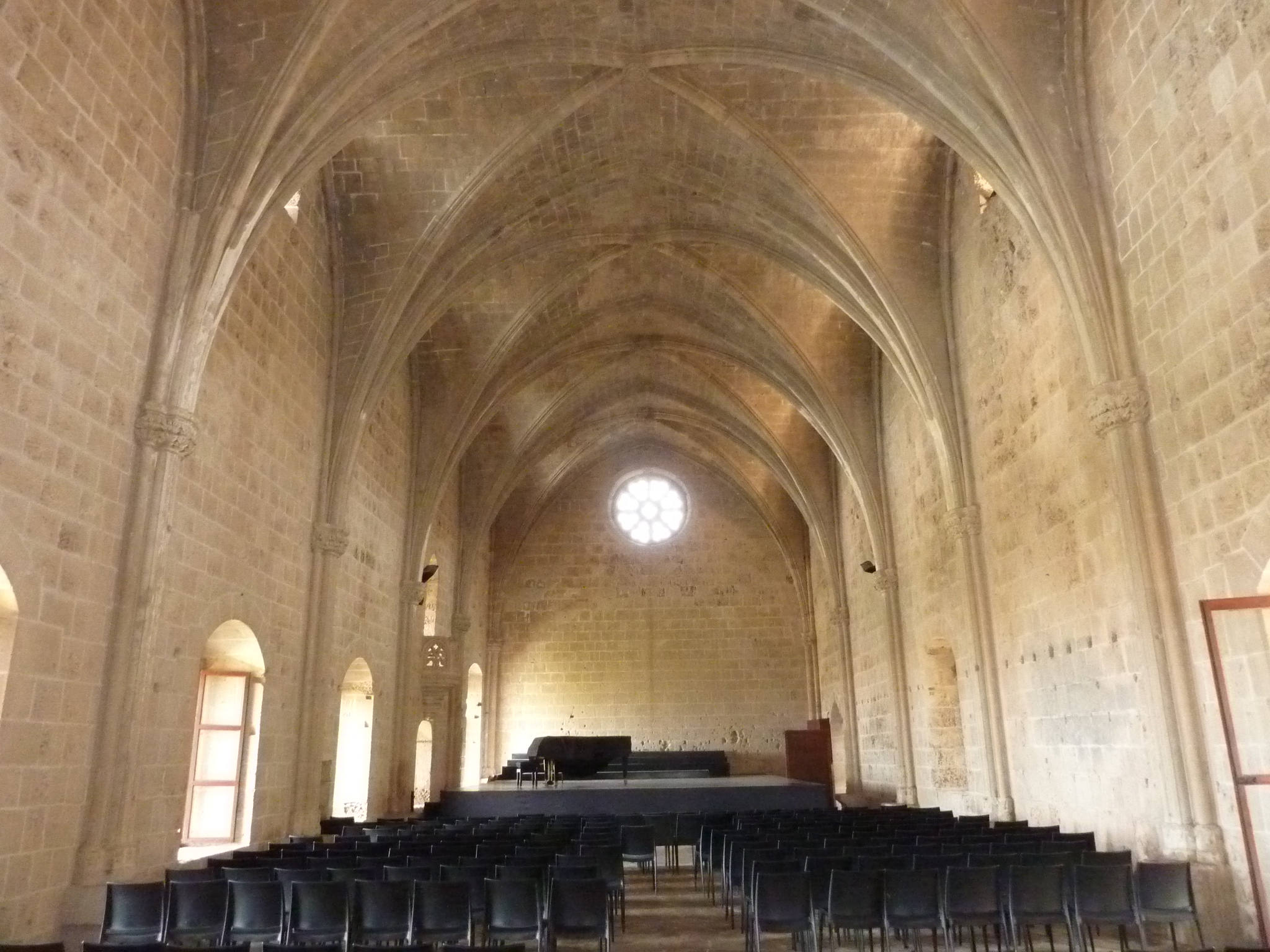
The Bellapais Abbey is home to many classical music and dance events.

The universities of Northern Cyprus are sources of diversity in terms of dance, as they hold nights where the students from tens of countries and continent perform their traditional dances.

Northern Cyprus hosts annual dance festivals in several styles. Salsa Jam is an annual festival of salsa, held in Kyrenia and the International Cyprus Tango Festival takes place in the Bellapais Abbey every year, organized by the Cyprus Tango Culture and Arts Association. Shows of other styles of dance, such as traditional Chinese dance, occasionally take place.

Several modern dance activities also take place in North Nicosia, where a number of dance schools are established. Internationally renowned musicals and dance shows are performed in front of crowded audiences in the Atatürk Culture and Congress Center. In 2010, North Nicosia was part of the international Earthdance activity, which was witnessed by thousands of locals.

== Literature ==
=== Poetry ===
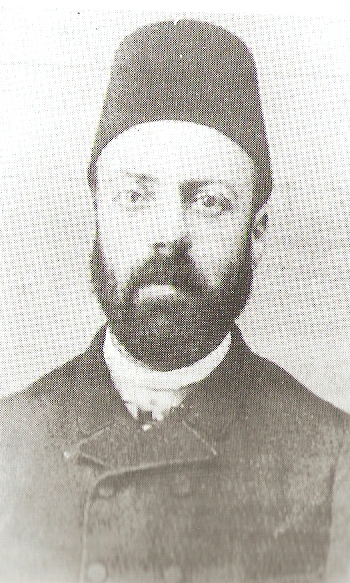
Kaytazzade Mehmet Nazım, an early Turkish Cypriot poet

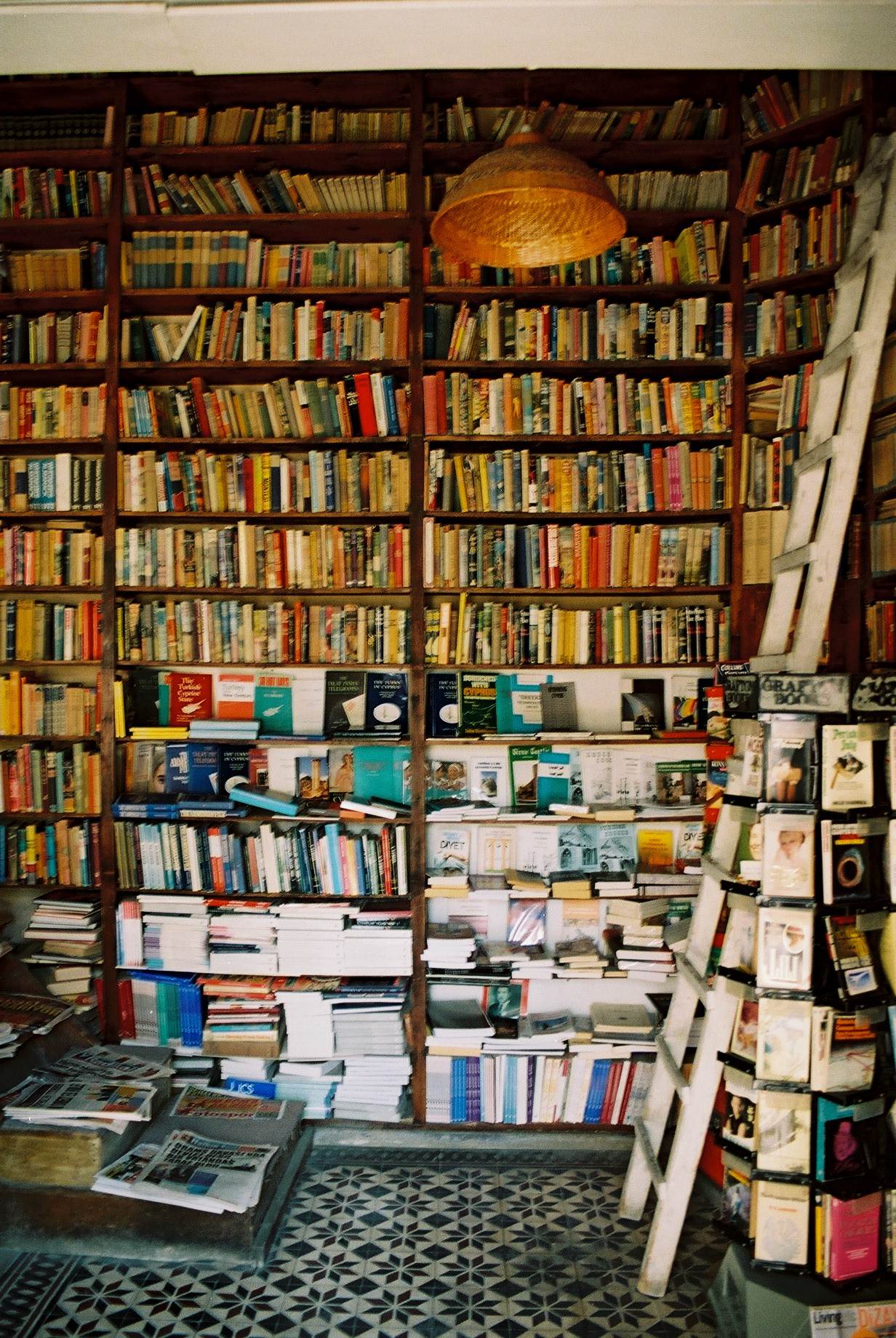
The historical Rüstem's Bookshop in North Nicosia.

Poetry is the most widely published form of literature in Northern Cyprus. Turkish Cypriot poetry is based on both the effects of Turkish literature and the culture of the island of Cyprus, along with some reflection of the British colonial history.

Early Turkish Cypriot poets include Kaytazzade Mehmet Nazım, Aşık Kenzi and Hasan Hilmi Efendi, who was called "the sultan of poets" by the Ottoman sultan Mahmud II. However, these poets are often not included in a distinct Turkish Cypriot literature as their writing identified with the Ottoman Empire and the Islamic community rather than Turkish Cypriots, whose literary identity had not been established at this time.

The first era of Turkish Cypriot poetry after the introduction of the Latin alphabet, characterised by poets such as Nazif Süleyman Ebeoğlu, Urkiye Mine Balman, Engin Gönül, Necla Salih Suphi and Pembe Marmara, had strong nationalistic elements due to the political attitudes of Turkish Cypriots at the time and stylistically reflected the poetry of the Turkish mainland. Meanwhile, other poets, such as Özker Yaşın, Osman Türkay, who was nominated for the Nobel Prize in Literature twice, and Nevzat Yalçın sought to write in more original styles, with the influence of nascent poetic styles in Turkey and those in Britain. This group of poets were very prolific and increased the popularity of poetry in the Turkish Cypriot community, and are seen as key figures in Turkish Cypriot literature.

In the 1960s, some poets attempted to popularize the then-mainstream poetic movements in Turkey. However, these attempts failed as the Turkish Cypriot society had a different political and cultural background. During this period, poets such as Fikret Demirağ, who followed a writing style in line with Turkey, developed a movement of abstract poetry in Cyprus.

The nationalism gave way to a notion of Cypriotness in the 1970s, with the influence of Yaşın, Türkay and Yalçın. During this period, the so-called "1974 generation of poets" arose, led by poets including Mehmet Yaşın, Hakkı Yücel, Nice Denizoğlu, Neşe Yaşın, Ayşen Dağlı and Canan Sümer. The poetry of this generation was characterized by the appreciation of the Turkish Cypriot identity as distinct from Turkish identity and the identification of Cyprus as the Turkish Cypriot homeland instead of Turkey, in contrast to the previous nationalist poetry. This approach is often called the "Cypriot poetry of rejection" as it resists the influence of Turkey, highlighting the cultural rift between Turkey and Cyprus due to the recent experience of war and therefore the independence of the Turkish Cypriot poetry and identity. This was followed by an increased adoption of the Mediterranean identity in the 1980s, accompanied by the effects of the liberalization of the Turkish Cypriot society, as reflected in the feminist elements, of which a particular example is Neriman Cahit.

Neşe Yaşın mainly writes in Turkish although a considerable number of her works of prose have been translated into Greek and English. In 2002 her novel Secret History of Sad Girls was banned in the TRNC and Turkey and she received multiple threats from Turkish nationalists. Urkiye Mine Balman has written in a wide variety genres, but her works are mostly romantic poems describing sometimes a lonesome village girl or country life and long-distance romances. Balman has published her works in Yesilada, Türk Dili, and Türk'e Dogru literary magazines in Turkey.

=== Oral literature ===
Mâni is an important form of traditional oral literature in the Turkish Cypriot culture. Before the transformation of the Turkish Cypriot society in the 20th century, winter nights were traditionally spent with the family, with the members of the family exchanging manis, riddles and folk tales for entertainment. While Turkish Cypriot manis originate from the Turkish oral tradition, they show significant functional differences, such as the elimination of religion-based manis about Ramadan in Cyprus. It was used as an important expression of love, especially during the times when lovers had to meet in secret. Traditionally, the use of manis have differed by the gender, with women using them at weddings, circumcision ceremonies, visits to the neighbors, and other forms of entertainment, as well as during harvest, while men performed them at weddings, festivals and while drinking in taverns.

Manis were learned from elderly mani tellers, who sometimes made subtle criticisms to the listener in the mani. This led to a tradition of "mani atışması", when two sides had a conversation, sometimes in a humorous way, using manis. Manis were also used for delivering advice to young people. There were special manis for weddings, ceremonies of asking for the girl's hand and "henna nights". Currently, the use of manis has greatly decreased in the society, but still persists, especially among women in rural areas. They are also used for entertaining the children by the elderly.

In Turkish Cypriot folklore, fairy tales are called "mesel" (as opposed to "masal" in standard Turkish). These fairy tales were usually told to children by elderly women, who were either relatives or guests of the parents. They were also told in coffeehouses by traditional storytellers. Turkish Cypriots fairy tales exhibit significant similarities with those in Anatolia and some are very similar to those in Turkmenistan. They often feature surrealistic events, such as those in foreign palaces and countries with exotic plants, or those featuring jinns engaged in the traditional Turkic sport cirit. However, they usually depict themes encountered in daily lives, such as love and ambition and were used to pass on traditional concepts regarding roles in the family, dynamics of relationships and conflicts that arise due to behavior to the children. Often, fairy tales are very typical with their use of language, as they utilize certain phrases and patterns to denote the beginning and the end of the story, as well as certain actions.

== Media ==
=== Television ===
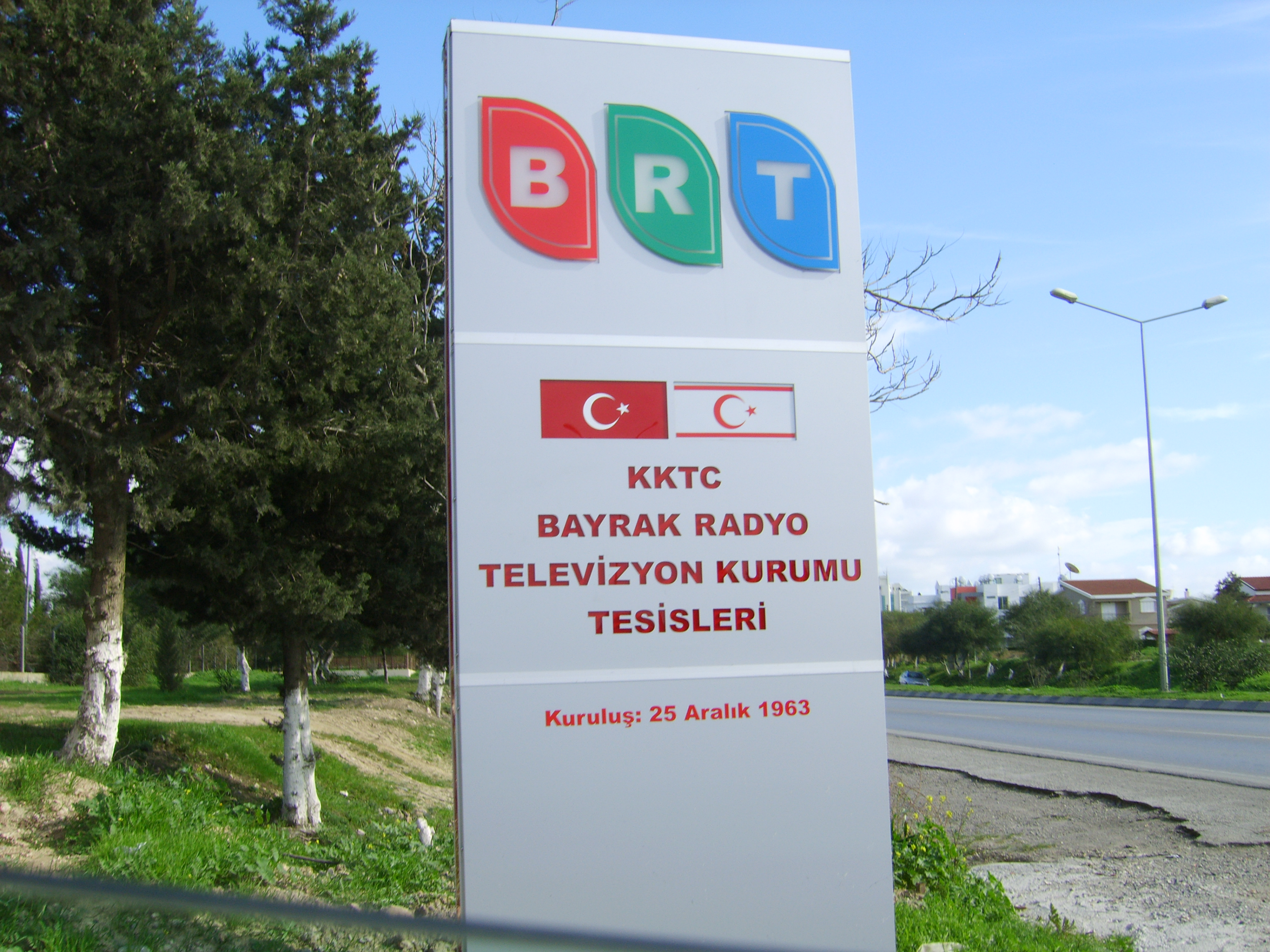
BRT headquarters in Nicosia.

Northern Cyprus has fourteen television channels, often accompanied by radio stations owned by the same company. Of these, BRT, which has two channels and many radio stations, is the state television. BRT is also the oldest Turkish Cypriot TV channel; it was established as a radio station in 1963, and launched its first television broadcast in 1976. Several Turkish Cypriot television channels are aligned with political parties or ideologies and make programs and reports according to their ideology, rather than for economic interests or publicity. Another factor that heavily politicizes Turkish Cypriot television is the political interests of the television channel owners, despite the Turkish Cypriot law prohibiting any person to own more than 20% of the shares of a channel.

=== Cinema ===
Anahtar (Key), released in 2011, was the first full-length film entirely produced in Northern Cyprus. Some other co-productions have also taken place. A co-production of Northern Cyprus, Turkey, Britain and the Netherlands, Kod Adı Venüs (Code Name Venus) was shown in the Cannes Film Festival in 2012. The film director and screenwriter Derviş Zaim achieved fame with his 2003 film Mud (Çamur) which won the UNESCO award at the Venice Film Festival.

The documentary film Kayıp Otobüs (The Missing Bus), directed by Turkish Cypriot journalist Fevzi Tașpınar, was aired on the TRT TV as well as participating in the Boston Film Festival in 2011. The film tells the story of eleven Turkish Cypriot workers who left their homes in a bus in 1964 that never came back. Their remains were found in a well in Cyprus in October 2006.

== Handicrafts ==
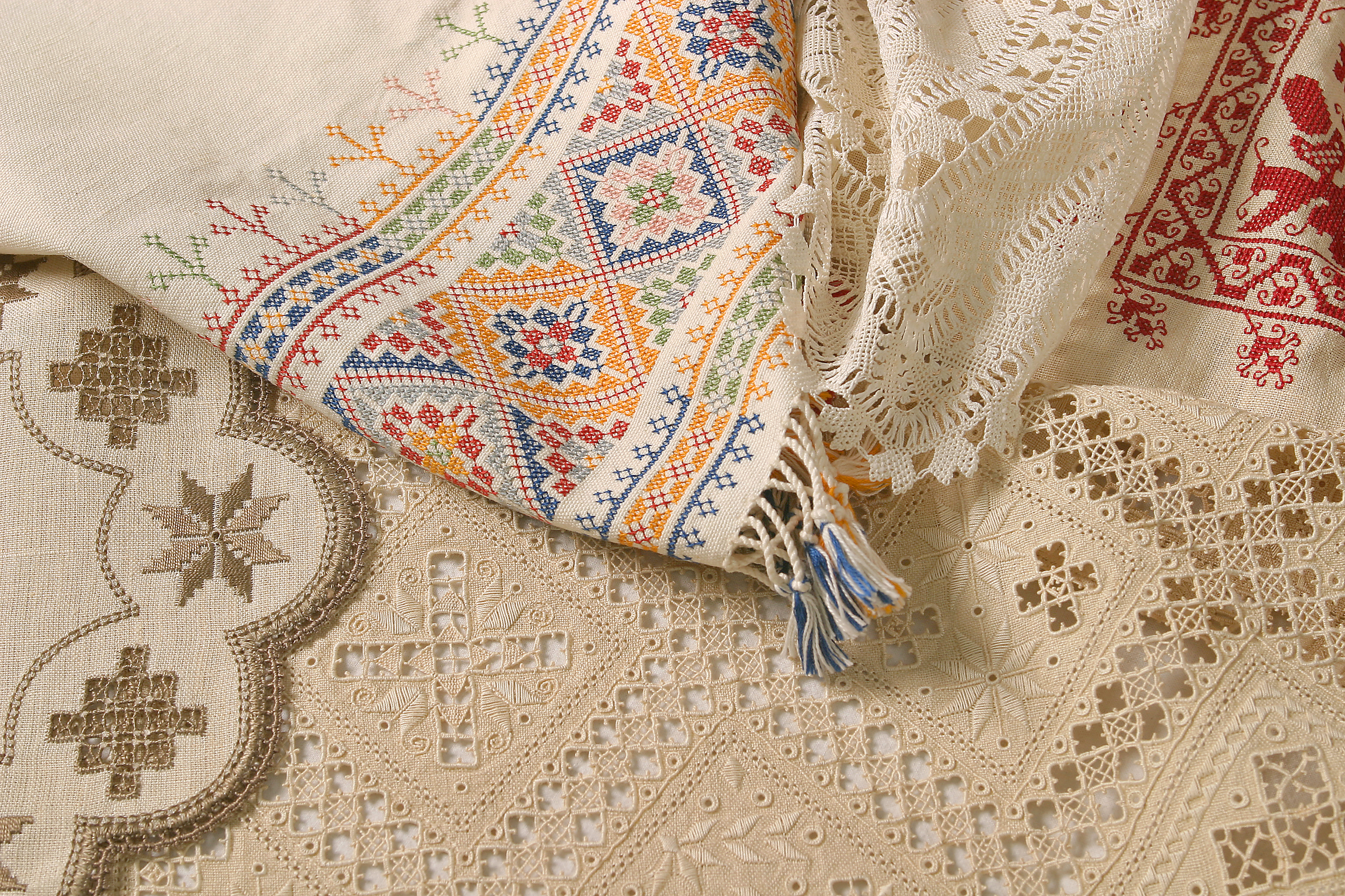
The Lefkara lace.

The Lefkara lace is an important form of embroidery in Northern Cyprus and is celebrated nationwide. Before 1974, it was produced in the mixed village of Pano Lefkara. After the invasion, it was brought to the north by Turkish Cypriot refugees, where it became popular everywhere and started being sold in the historic center of North Nicosia, in Büyük Han and Arasta. The lace is believed to be more than 700 years old and a synthesis of Venetian and Cypriot culture, and has 7-8 surviving forms.

The Lapta lace, also known as "hesap işi", is an exclusively Cypriot handicraft and is mostly practiced by Turkish Cypriots around Lapithos. It is rooted in the 19th century and has unique patterns. "Koza işi", made from the silk cocoons of caterpillars, is another handicraft that is exclusive to Cyprus, where the cocoons are cut and embroidered in trays in unique designs.

Braiding together reeds, straws, branches of date trees and other branches to make baskets and ornaments is a common handicraft in Northern Cyprus. A unique product, traditionally braided by Cypriot women, is the sesta, which is a uniquely designed pan with original designs, made from the stem of a particular kind of wheat. A traditionally important and symbolic handicraft in the Turkish Cypriot culture is the manufacture of chairs from reeds and straws. These chairs were traditionally ubiquitous in homes, where they were considered standard furniture. However, this handicraft is currently under the threat of extinction due to the competition from plastic chairs and meticulous work involved.

Traditional handicrafts in Cyprus are commonly taught and practiced by women's village courses, organized by the government and municipalities, and exhibited at cultural centers. There are also courses open to everyone, organized by municipalities, and some associations promoting and producing handicrafts. Most forms of embroidery, however, are still considered as women's work.

== Sports ==
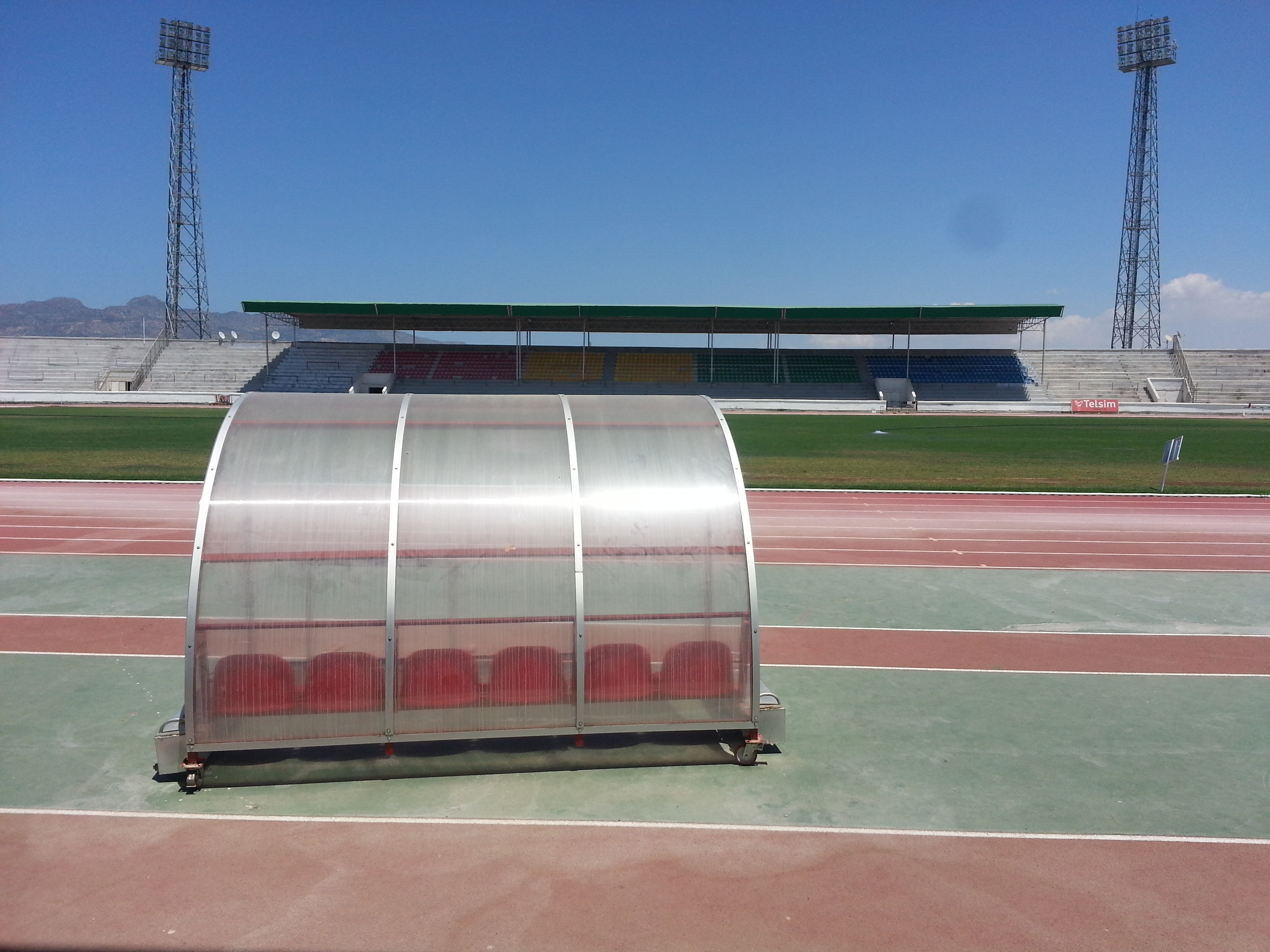
Nicosia Atatürk Stadium is the largest stadium in Northern Cyprus.

There are five stadiums in Northern Cyprus, with each holding a capacity ranging anywhere from 7,000 to 30,000. The most popular sport in Northern Cyprus is soccer. There are over 29 sport federations in Northern Cyprus with a total registered membership of 13,838, 6,054 been registered practitioners for, taekwondo-karate-aikido-kurash, with shooting having (1,150 registered) and hunting having (1,017 registered) members. Northern Cyprus' national football team currently ranks 109th in the Elo Ratings. Several of sport clubs participate in leagues in Turkey. These include the Fast Break Sport Club in Turkey's Men's Basketball Regional League; the Beşparmak Sport Club in Turkey's Handball Premier League; and the Lefke European University Turkey Table-tennis Super League. Water sports such as windsurfing, jetskiing, waterskiing and sailing are also available at beaches throughout the coastline of Northern Cyprus. Sailing is especially found at Escape Beach Club, near Kyrenia.

== Theater ==
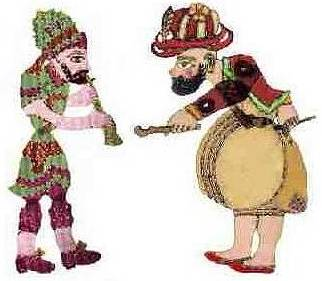
Karagöz and Hacivat

Theater in Northern Cyprus is mostly carried out by the Turkish Cypriot State Theater, municipal theaters and a number of private theatrical companies. Cyprus Theater Festival, organised by the Nicosia Turkish Municipality is a large organization with institutions from Turkey participating as well. There are no major halls built specifically for theater in Northern Cyprus, so plays often take place in conference halls. The Nicosia Municipal Theater is one of the most important theatrical groups in Northern Cyprus, its plays appeal to broad audiences in Turkey and Cyprus and they conduct programs to popularize theater among Turkish Cypriot children.

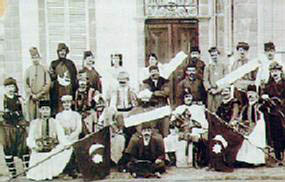
An early Turkish Cypriot theatre group, 1880s

The origins of Turkish Cypriot theater lie in Karagöz and Hacivat, a shadow play that was popularized in the island as a form of entertainment during the Ottoman era. This form of theater has lost its popularity nowadays, but remains to be televised during religious festivals. After the 1840s, as the Ottoman Empire started modernizing, theater with greater European elements met with the Turkish Cypriot public. However, the inception of Turkish Cypriot theater in the modern sense is considered the staging of the play "Vatan Yahut Silistre" ("Homeland vs. Silistra") by Turkish playwright Namık Kemal in 1908. This was followed by a proliferation of theatrical activity in the Turkish Cypriot community as local plays were written and staged and theatrical companies from Turkey took the stage in Cyprus by the 1920s, all the major towns in Cyprus had Turkish Cypriot plays that were performed regularly.

In the 1960s, Turkish Cypriot theater started to be institutionalised. A leading theater group named "İlk Sahne" (First Stage), founded in 1963, was renamed the Turkish Cypriot State Theater in 1966, and has since performed more than 85 plays. Theater is currently a very popular form of art in Northern Cyprus, with long queues forming for tickets of the plays in the Cyprus Theater Festival, and the number of theater-goers constantly increasing.

== See also ==
- List of Turkish Cypriots
