= Turkish Republic of Northern Cyprus Presidential Symphony Orchestra =

- Orchestra
- Native name: Kuzey Kıbrıs Türk Cumhuriyeti Cumhurbaşkanlığı Senfoni Orkestrası
- Short name: KKTC CSO
- Founded: 2015
- Principal conductor: Ali Hoca
- Website: senfoni.gov.ct.tr

The Turkish Republic of Northern Cyprus Presidential Symphony Orchestra (Turkish: Kuzey Kıbrıs Türk Cumhuriyeti Cumhurbaşkanlığı Senfoni Orkestrası; KKTC CSO) with headquarters in Northern Nicosia, is the presidential symphony orchestra of the Turkish Republic of Northern Cyprus.

The orchestra, which was established by the TRNC Presidential Symphony Orchestra (PSO) Law, which was unanimously accepted in the TRNC Assembly of the Republic on April 21, 2014, has been actively giving concerts in Northern Cyprus and the Republic of Turkey since January 2015. TRNC PSO gave its first concert on 28 November 2015; has given and continues to give concerts with Alexander Markov, Fazıl Say, Rüya Taner, Antonio Pirolli and many other artists.

The first opera work of the Turkish Republic of Northern Cyprus, "Arap Ali Destanı" was staged on 21 September 2019, in partnership with the Turkish Republic of Northern Cyprus State Opera and Ballet Coordination Center (KKTCDOB), the Republic of Turkey State Opera and Ballet and the TRNC Presidential Symphony Orchestra.

The principal conductor of the orchestra has been Ali Hoca since 2015.
