= Nicosia Municipal Orchestra =

Turkish Cypriot orchestra

Nicosia Municipal Orchestra (Turkish: Lefkoşa Belediye Orkestrası) is an orchestra based in North Nicosia operated by the Nicosia Turkish Municipality. As of 2014, it was the largest orchestra in Northern Cyprus.

It was established in 1987, under the administration of the mayor Mustafa Akıncı. The project stagnated for some years due to financial difficulties, but its official establishment was realized in 1991. During Şemi Bora's term as mayor, the orchestra developed to incorporate a large number of musicians, educate new musicians in Nicosia, give concerts in parks, squares and public squares and organize the Light Music Composition Contest, which it annually organizes to this date. In 2002, the Chamber Orchestra was established and under Kutlay Erk, emphasis was put on classical music.

The orchestra delivers regular concerts at public places in the walled city of Nicosia, including Büyük Han, Lefke Hanı and Bandabuliya. It has several sub-divisions, including the Latin Orchestra. Its children's orchestra was established in 2013. As of 2014, it was headed by Can Sözer. The orchestra has greatly contributed to the participation of Northern Cyprus in the Türkvizyon Song Contest. It annually organizes the Classical Music Days of Nicosia, which last more than a month. All of the income earned from its concerts are donated to charity and non-governmental organizations.

Journalist Sami Özuslu has called the orchestra's activities a "scream" to the Turkish Cypriot community, calling for Turkish Cypriots to engage in and preserve their cultural activities to ensure their communal survival. He also called the orchestra "capable of competing internationally in terms of talent and education". Following a big financial crisis in the Nicosia Turkish Municipality, the orchestra reportedly "lost support" in the years 2012–13 and had to bear "unfair amounts of work" only to see "lack of public interest".

== See also ==
- Nicosia Municipal Theater
