= Rüstem's Bookshop =

- Rüstem Kitabevi
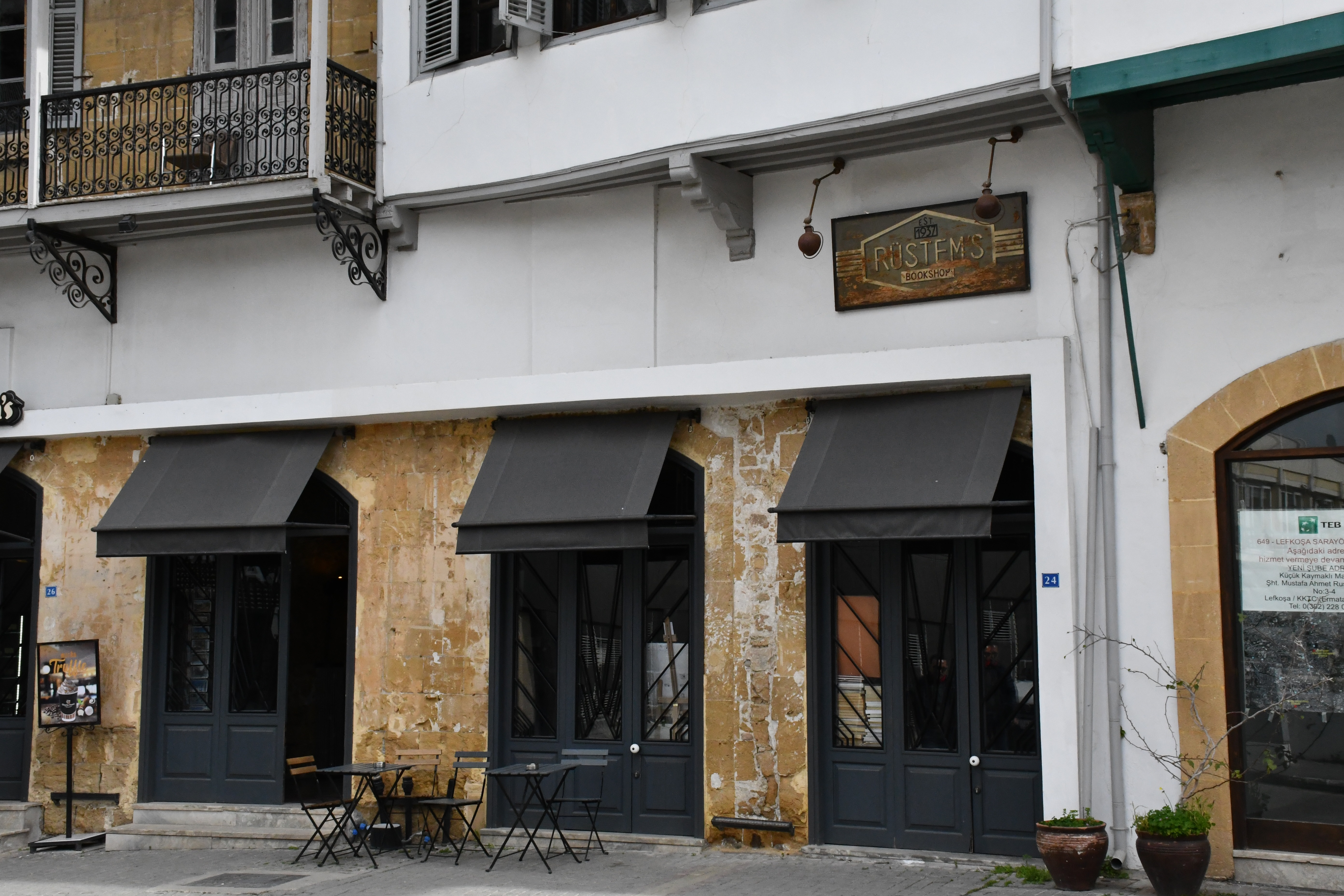
- Interactive map of the Rüstem's Bookshop area

General information
- Location: Nicosia, Cyprus
- Coordinates: 35.17718°N 33.36115°E
- Opened: 1937
- Owner: Rüstem family

Rüstem's Bookshop (Turkish: Rüstem Kitabevi) is a historic bookshop in Nicosia, Cyprus. Established in 1937, it is the oldest bookshop still in operation on the island.

== History ==
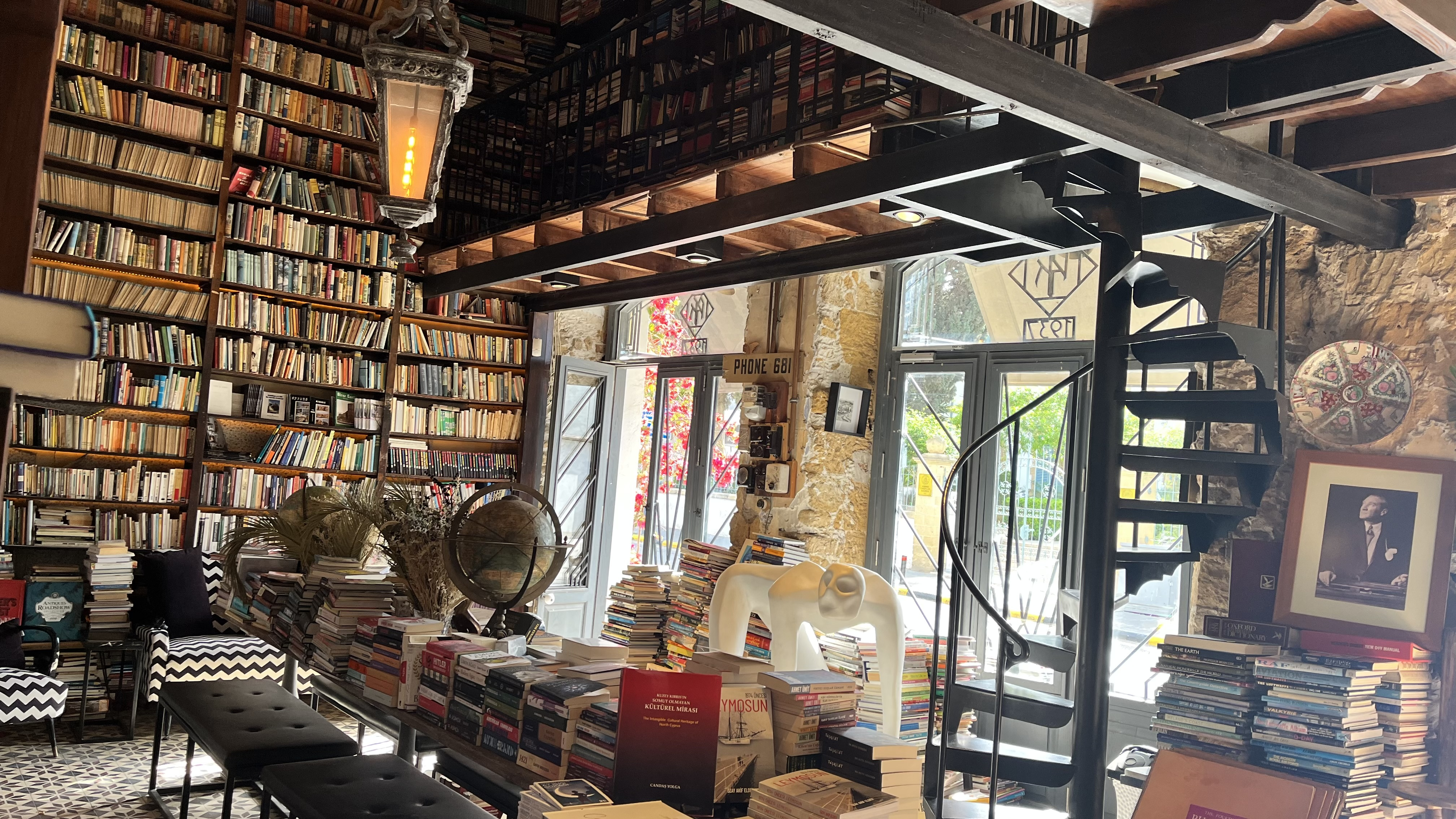
Inside the bookshop, with floor-to-ceiling shelves.

The bookshop was opened in 1937 by Kemal Rüstem. The building housing the current bookshop was built in 1917, located inside the Walled City of Nicosia, intended to be the house of the Rüstem family. The building possesses a blend of Ottoman and British architectural styles, and consists of traditional Cypriot stone on the first floor, alongside Ottoman architectural features on the second floor. Inside the bookshop is a mesmerising homage to books, with towering floor-to-ceiling shelves, ladders and vintage items, alongside a courtyard.

Established under British rule, the bookshop initially sold novels, guides, maps and postcards, and up until the 1970s, it was the largest bookshop selling books in English on the island. A serious man who always wore a suit, Kemal Rüstem started by catering to visitors and the British clientele when it first opened, and it quickly became a favourite meeting place of Cypriot intellectuals and the British colonial elite.

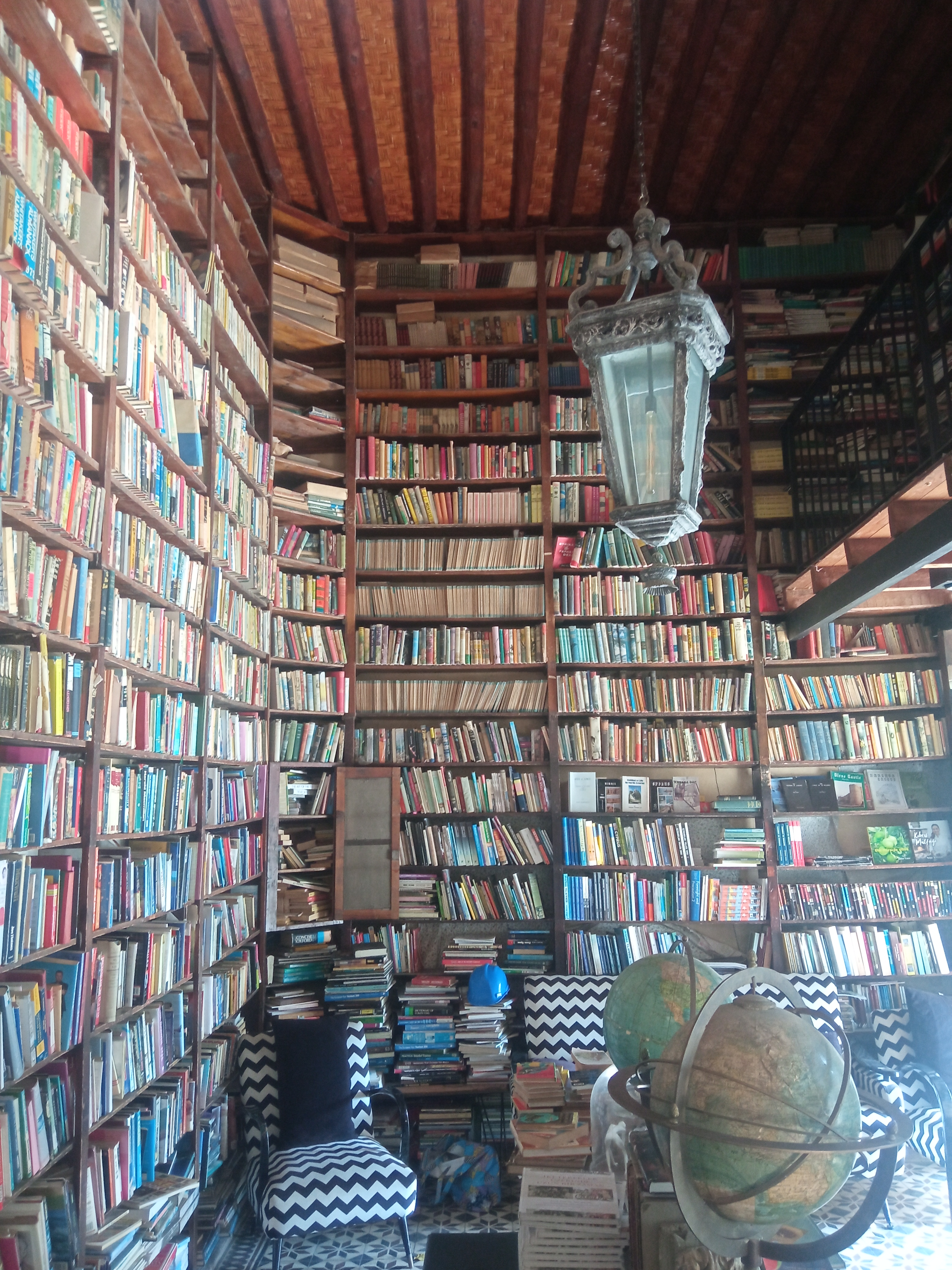
The main book hall.

In 1957, Rüstem's became a publisher under the imprint K. Rüstem & Bro.; their first publication, Cyprus in Colour, was the first coloured book published on the island. In 1997, Ali Rüstem (Kemal Rüstem's son) took over the family business. The bookstore now also hosts a cafe, event space, exhibition gallery and a small traditional restaurant serving lunch on the second floor. Until 2005, the bookshop only sold books in English, but it has since started selling books in other languages. It currently sells both second hand books and new publications.

== Location ==
It is located on Kyrenia Street, right in front of the main Evkaf administration building and nearby Sarayönü Square. It is around 250 metres from the Green Line and the Ledra Street checkpoint. It is located in an area de facto administered by Northern Cyprus.
