= Nicosia Municipal Theater =

Turkish Cypriot theater

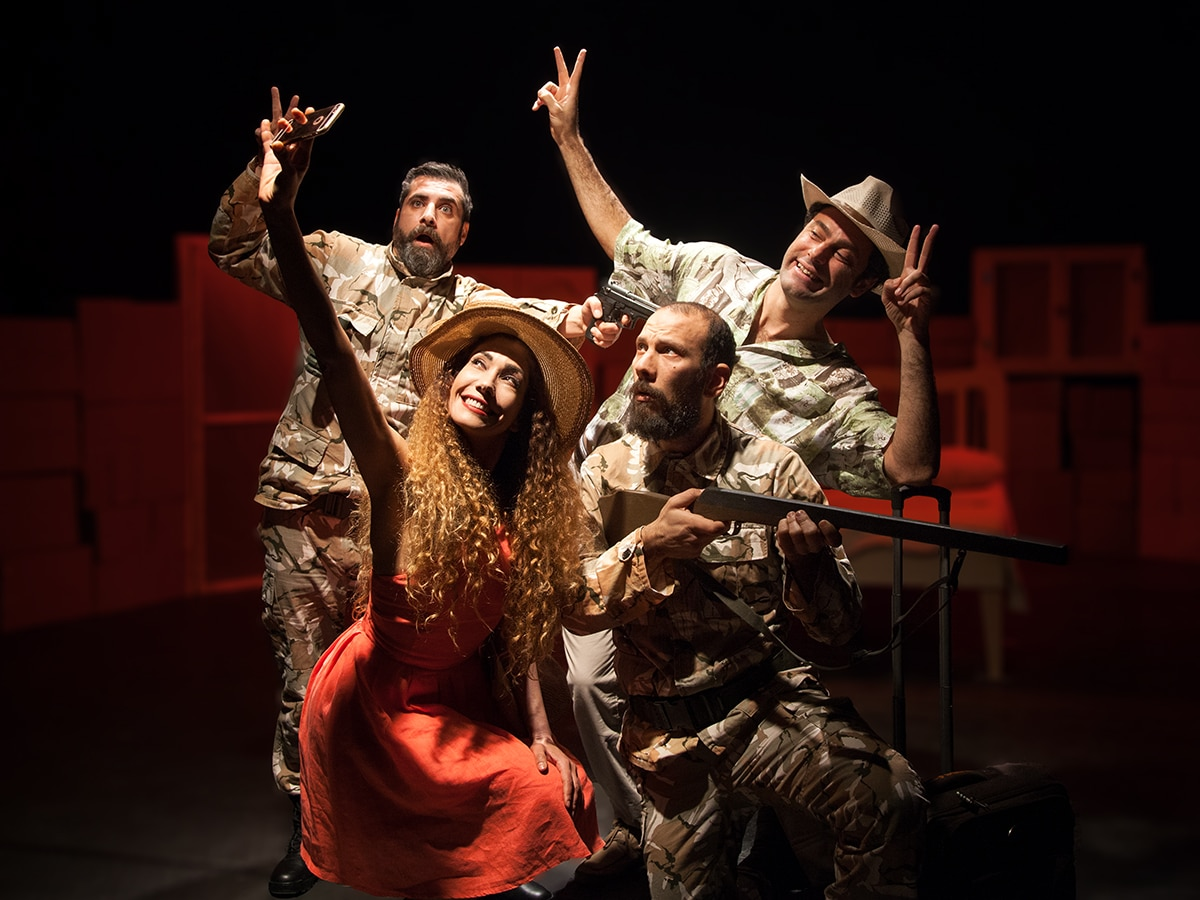
A scene from the premiere of the play İki Kişilik Hırgür at the Nicosia Municipal Theater

Nicosia Municipal Theater (Turkish: Lefkoşa Belediye Tiyatrosu) is a prominent theatrical organization in Northern Cyprus. Headquartered in North Nicosia, it is organized under the Nicosia Turkish Municipality. It was founded in 1980.

== History ==
Following the 1980 Turkish coup d'état, a group of actors, including Osman Alkaş and Erol Refikoglu, were fired from the Turkish Cypriot State Theatre for staging a politically sensitive play. Despite the limited budget of the municipality, Mustafa Akıncı, the mayor at the time, worked to provide sponsorship for a new Nicosia Municipal Theater. The theater was officially founded on 3 November 1980.

From humble beginnings in a building converted from a barn, the Nicosia Municipal Theater grew into a cultural center of the community. It has been praised for its performances that do not abstain from expressing political views. The theater has toured outside Northern Cyprus in various cities across Turkey and in the Republic of Cyprus. The annual Cyprus Theater Festival is organized under the aegis of the Nicosia Municipal Theater.

In 2012, the temporary administration of the municipality abruptly announced the closure of the theater due to financial problems. This attempt to close the theater met with immediate protests from the arts community.

The current theater building is a Neoclassical structure owned by the city of Nicosia, which has been used for performances since 1967.

Since 1996, the Capital Theatre Project has been planned to create a new cultural center to house the Nicosia Municipal Theater, with a 2500-person capacity amphitheater and multiple smaller theaters, concert halls, and museums. The project has been stalled since 2012 due to lack of funding. In 2013, then-mayor of Nicosia Kadri Fellahoğlu stated that work would continue on the new theater. In 2017, the still-unfinished theater building was in a state of extreme disrepair, with mayor Mehmet Harmancı announcing that repairs and completion would cost 17 million Turkish lira.

In 2023, the Nicosia Municipal Theater building was illuminated with the flag of Israel to commemorate the October 7 attacks.

== See also ==
- Nicosia Municipal Orchestra
