= Kaytazzade Mehmet Nazım =

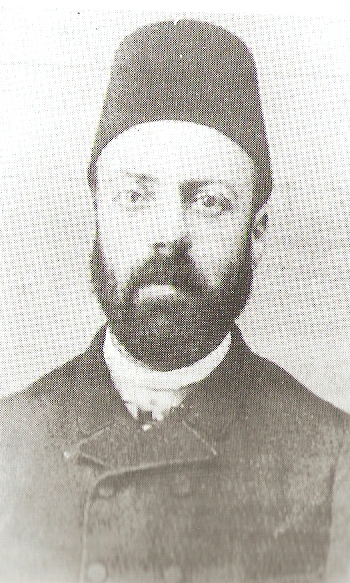
- Born: 1857; Nicosia, Cyprus
- Died: 1924 (aged 67)
- Occupation: Poet

Kaytazzade Mehmet Nazım (1857–1924) was a Turkish Cypriot poet. He was one of the leading Turkish Cypriot poets of the 19th century.

== Biography ==
Kaytazzade Mehmet Nazım was born in 1857 in Nicosia, Cyprus. In 1884, Nazım worked as an Ottoman official in the public service of the Ottoman Empire in Chios, Adana, Istanbul, İzmir, and Bursa. He then resigned from his duties and returned to his native Cyprus where he continued his profession in poetry.
