= Kumarcilar Han =

Coordinates: 35.177094°N 33.362687°E

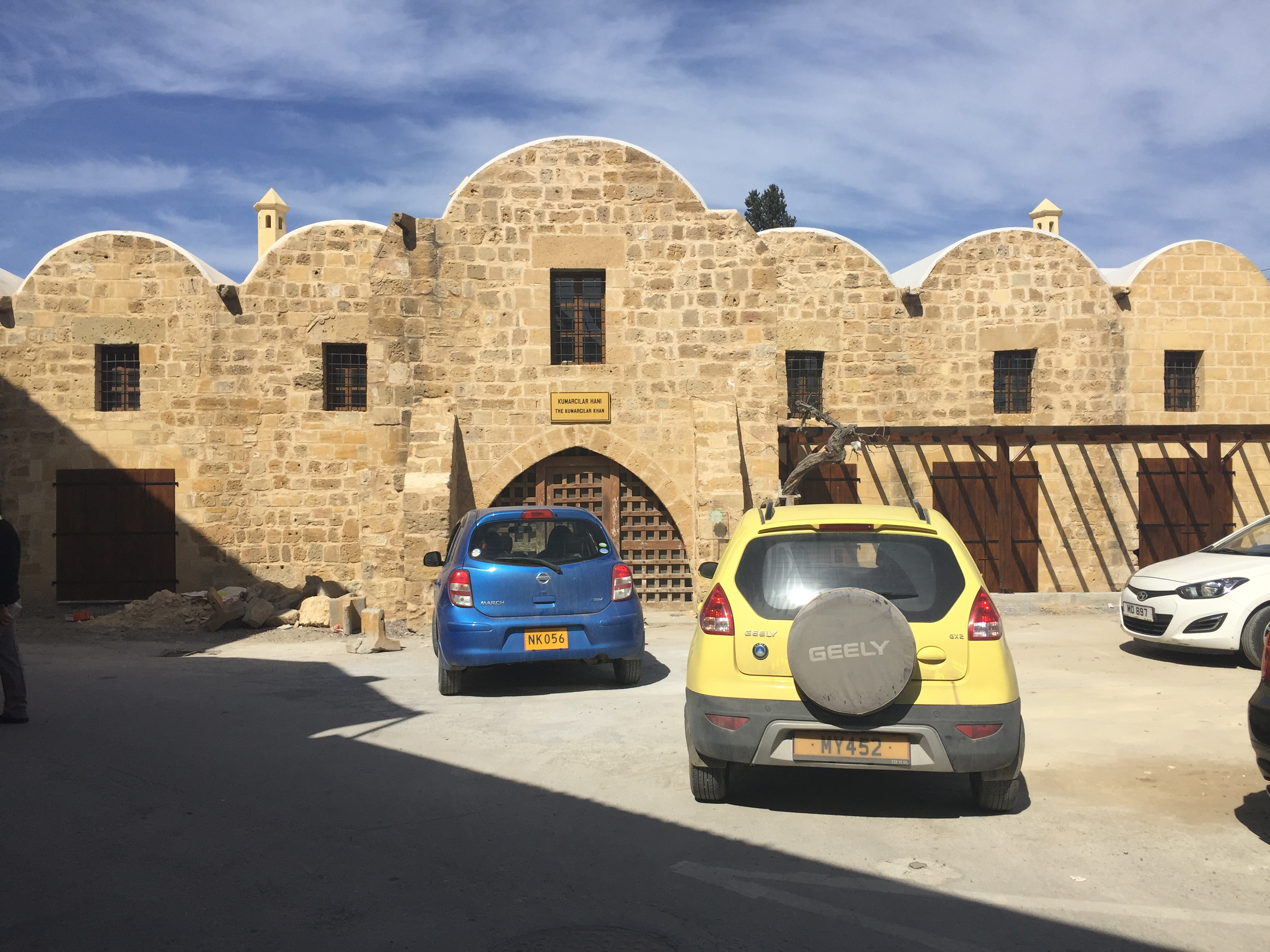
Kumarcılar Hanı after restoration in 2016

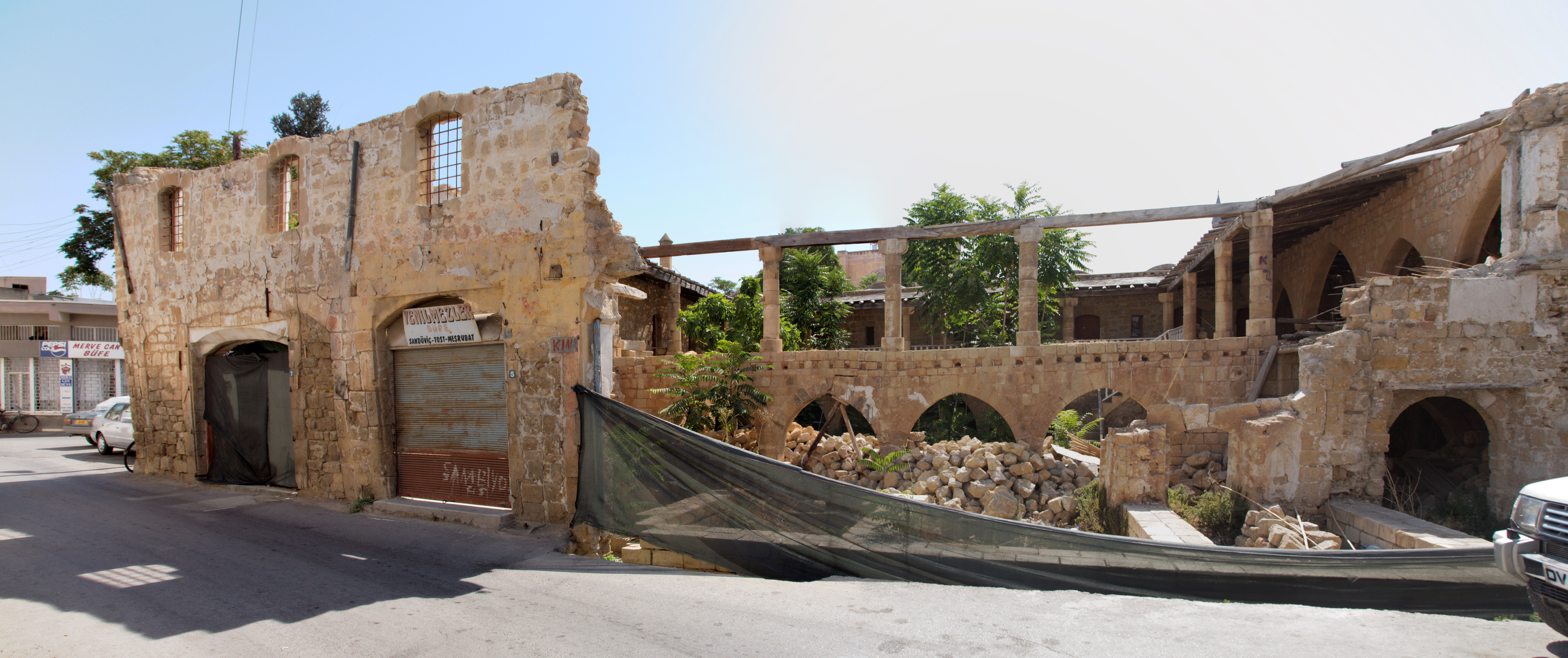
The Kumarcilar Han as of 2008

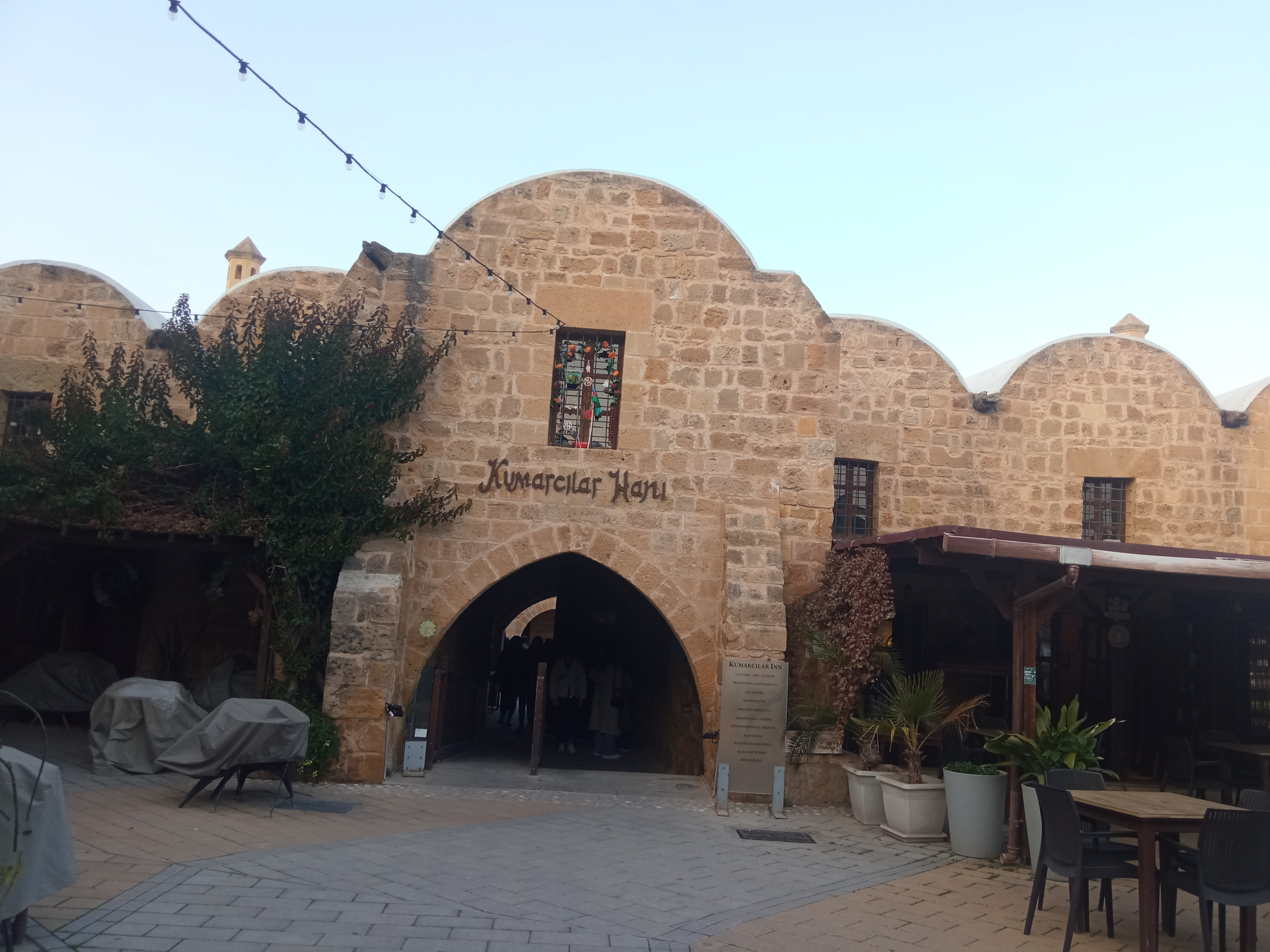

Kumarcilar Han (Gambler's Inn) is a caravansarai located in North Nicosia, Northern Cyprus. It is unknown when exactly it was built, however it is thought to be built around the end of the 17th century, is much smaller and modest when compared with Büyük Han (Great Inn). Similar to all caravansarai, the entrance leads to an open-air courtyard, which is surrounded by a two-storey building, originally containing 56 rooms. Those on the upper story were used by the travelers, while those on the ground floor were used for their animals and belongings. The building was in a state of disrepair and in danger of collapsing for centuries. Efforts to restore the building have been hampered often, due to lack of funds.

As at January 2018, the Kumarcilar Han has been fully restored, and is used as a cafe/restaurant, as well as small shops selling local items.

According to Haşmet Muzaffer Gürkan, the door of the caravenserai "indubitably" used to belong to a Latin building. A hypothesis about its name states that it was originally called "Kumbaracılar Hanı", after a subdivision of the Ottoman army, "kumbaracılar". It was recorded with different names at different times, in 1881, it was called "Kuchuk Khan" ("Small Inn") in a map and Rupert Gunnis wrote in 1936 that it was called the "Khan of Itinerant Musicians".

== Bibliography ==
- Darke, Diana (2009), North Cyprus, Bradt Travel Guides, ISBN 1-84162-244-3.
- Dubin, Marc; Morris, Damien (2002), Cyprus, Rough Guides, ISBN 1-85828-863-0.
