= Rüya Taner =

Turkish-Cypriot pianist

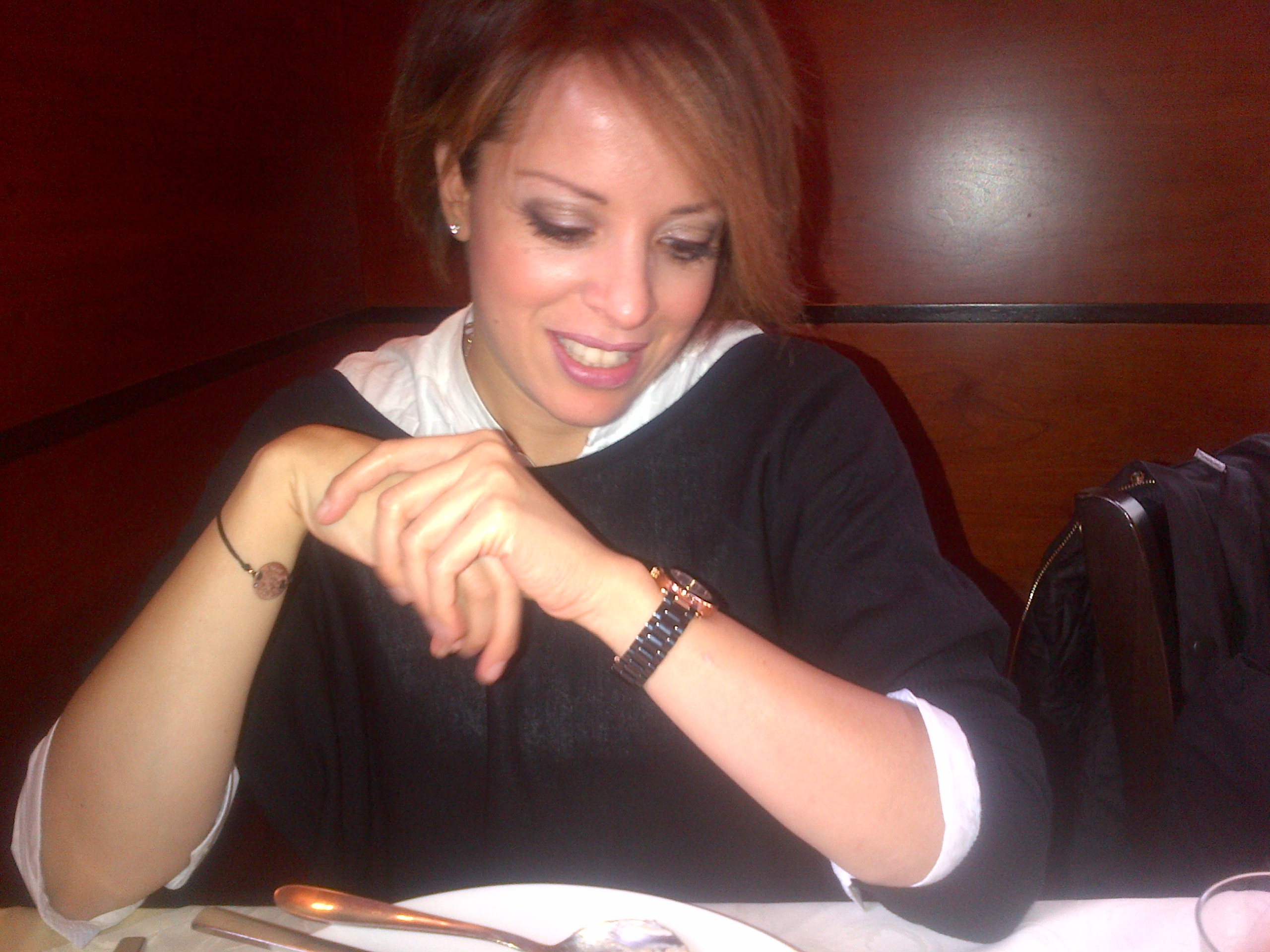
Rüya Taner in 2012

Rüya Taner is a Turkish Cypriot pianist. She was born in Germany and settled in Ankara, Turkey, in the early 1980s, where she studied at the State Conservatory. Taner is acknowledged as one of the leading Turkish pianists of the contemporary generation.
