= Büyük Han =

Caravan resting place in Nicosia, Northern Cyprus

Coordinates: 35.1763°N 33.3625°E

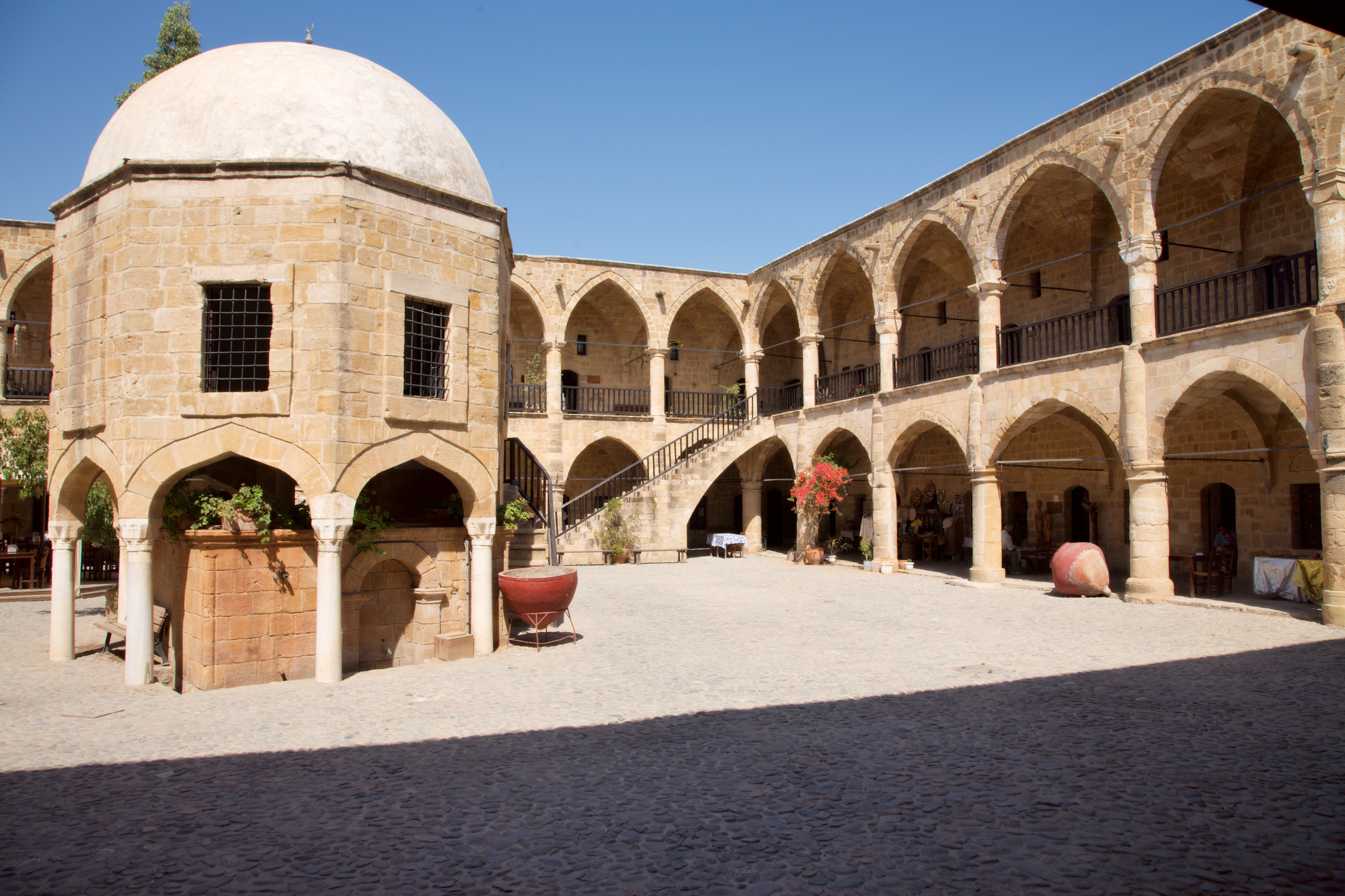
Great Inn

Büyük Han (lit. 'Great Inn') (Greek: Μεγάλο Πανδοχείο, romanized: Megálo Pandocheío) is the largest caravansarai on the island of Cyprus and is considered to be one of the finest buildings on the island. Located in the capital of Cyprus, it was built by the Ottomans in 1572, the year after they had seized Cyprus from the Venetians. In the centre of the open courtyard is a mosque with a fountain for pre-prayer ablutions. It became the first city prison under British administration. After spending most of the 1990s being restored, the inn has been revived as a thriving arts centre, consisting of several galleries and workshops. There are also several courtyard cafes and souvenir shops.

== History ==
According to historical records, the building was built in 1572 under the auspices of Muzaffer Pasha, the first Ottoman governor of Cyprus, and was modelled after Koza Han in Bursa. The building was reportedly built upon the remains of an older one. However, archaeologist Tuncer Bağışkan attributes the construction of the inn to his successor, Sinan Pasha, as Muzaffer Pasha had been appointed as the governor of Tripolitania on 26 August 1571. There is one surviving letter from Selim II about the inn, where, upon being informed that some shops had been demolished to build a caravansarai, he ordered that if the caravansarai was not profitable for the vakıf, it should be demolished and replaced with new shops. Journalist Ahmet Tolgay, however, has written that Muzaffer Pasha ordered the construction and oversaw the groundbreaking of the building before being executed. According to İslâm Ansiklopedisi, Muzaffer Pasha requested an architect for the reconstruction of Cypriot fortresses from Constantinople. The architect that was sent, named Bostan, could have constructed Büyük Han.

Initially, the caravansarai was known as Yeni Han, lit. 'the New Inn'. It also became known as Alanyalılar Hanı, lit. 'the Inn of those from Alanya', as it was frequented by merchants from Alanya. However, when the smaller Kumarcilar Han was built opposite the Asmaaltı Square, it became known as 'the Great Inn' (Büyük Han) in the 17th century.

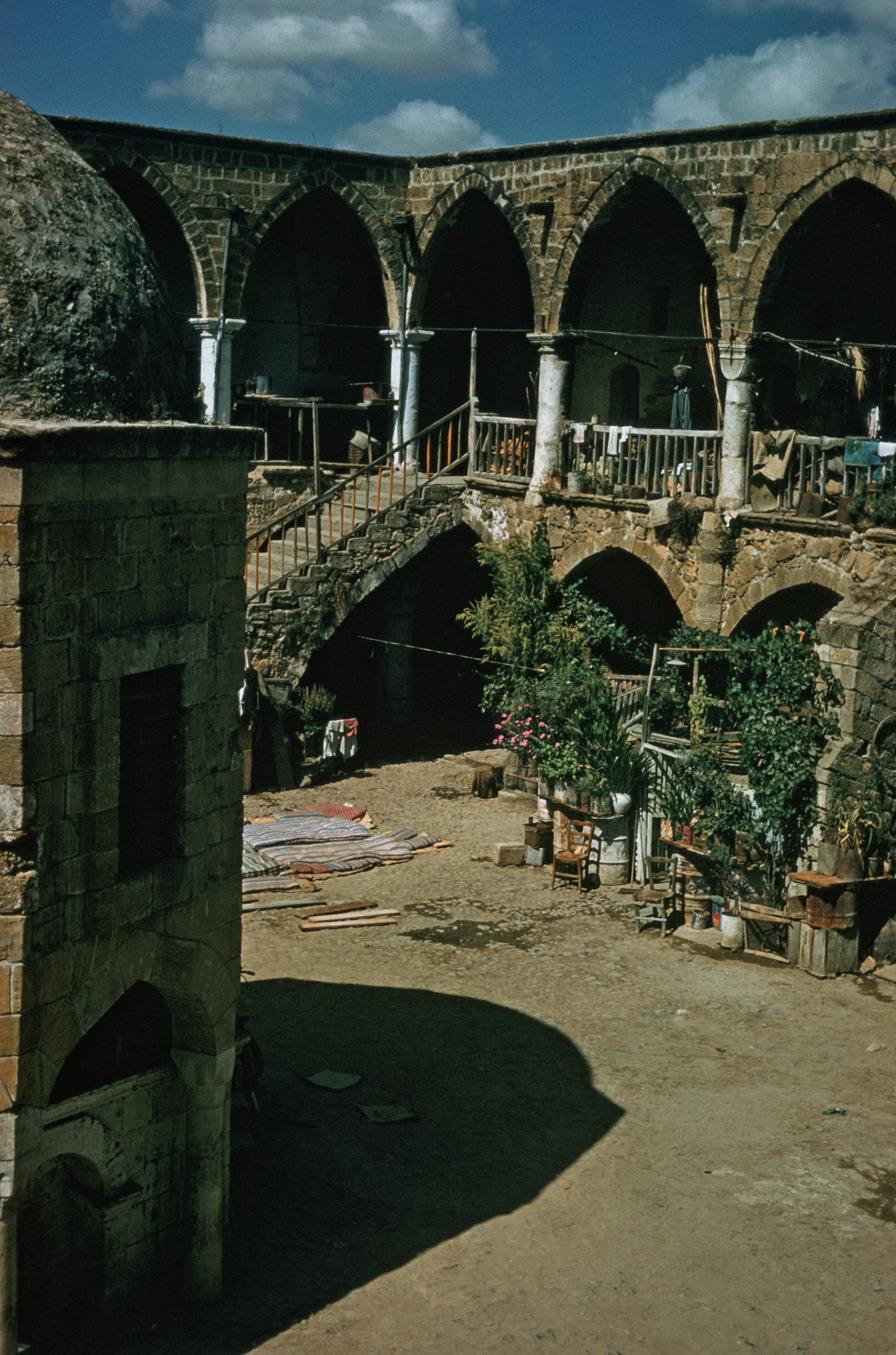
The caravanserai in about 1958, showing signs of residence by families

Upon the British takeover in 1878, the inn was restored for use as a prison. It was used as the Central Prison of Nicosia between 1892 and 1903, when the prison was moved to a new building west of the Pedieos. In the years 1900 and 1901, when the British administration left the building, the shops at the back were extended up to the point where they met the road, with the permission of the Evkaf Administration. Between 1903 and 1947, the building was used as an inn. Between 1947 and 1962, it became a refuge for poor families where they could rent rooms cheaply.

== Architecture ==
The inn has two floors and a more or less square shape; its dimensions are 50.67 m by 45.25 m. There is a large inner courtyard which is surrounded by the rooms that have colonnades with cross vaults in front. There are 68 rooms in both floors, with the ones at the ground floor being historically used for commerce and the ones at the first floor historically used for accommodation. There are also 10 one-storey shops behind the colonnade at the eastern entrance.

The entrance to the inn is through two doors at the east and the west. The main door is located at the eastern side and opens to Asmaaltı Square. There are hexagonal or octagonal stone chimneys placed above fireplaces in each room; Rupert Gunnis found these chimneys idiosyncratic and claimed that they could originate from the medieval building that once stood at the site.

In the middle of the inner courtyard is a special type of masjid known is Turkish as köşk mescidi (lit. 'mansion masjid'). The stones that were used to build this masjid are believed, according to Bağışkan, to have come from other buildings. The masjid corresponds to similar masjids built in Anatolian caravansarais such as Koza Han in Bursa or Rüstem Paşa Hanı in Edirne during the 13th–17th centuries. In 1927, George Jeffery noted that the masjid was used as a hayloft.

There is a grave that lies to the southwest of the masjid. This grave is traditionally held to belong to either a high-standing person who died whilst worshipping in the masjid or Muzaffer Pasha himself who is traditionally held to be executed. However, Bağışkan draws attention to the pasha's appointment to Tripolitania and says that it is a myth that he is buried there. The grave was historically used as a place for offering, though this use ended "a long time ago".

== Current use ==
Since its restoration, the Evkaf Administration has mandated in tenancy agreements that all products sold within Büyük Han are manufactured by the tenants themselves and has placed a ban on selling externally produced items. As such, shops in the caravanserai sell traditional Cypriot handicrafts and most tenants are women that produce such handicrafts. The Evkaf Administration carries out checks to ensure that the tenants comply with the terms of the tenancy agreement, and warns tenants if any violations are detected.

== Gallery ==
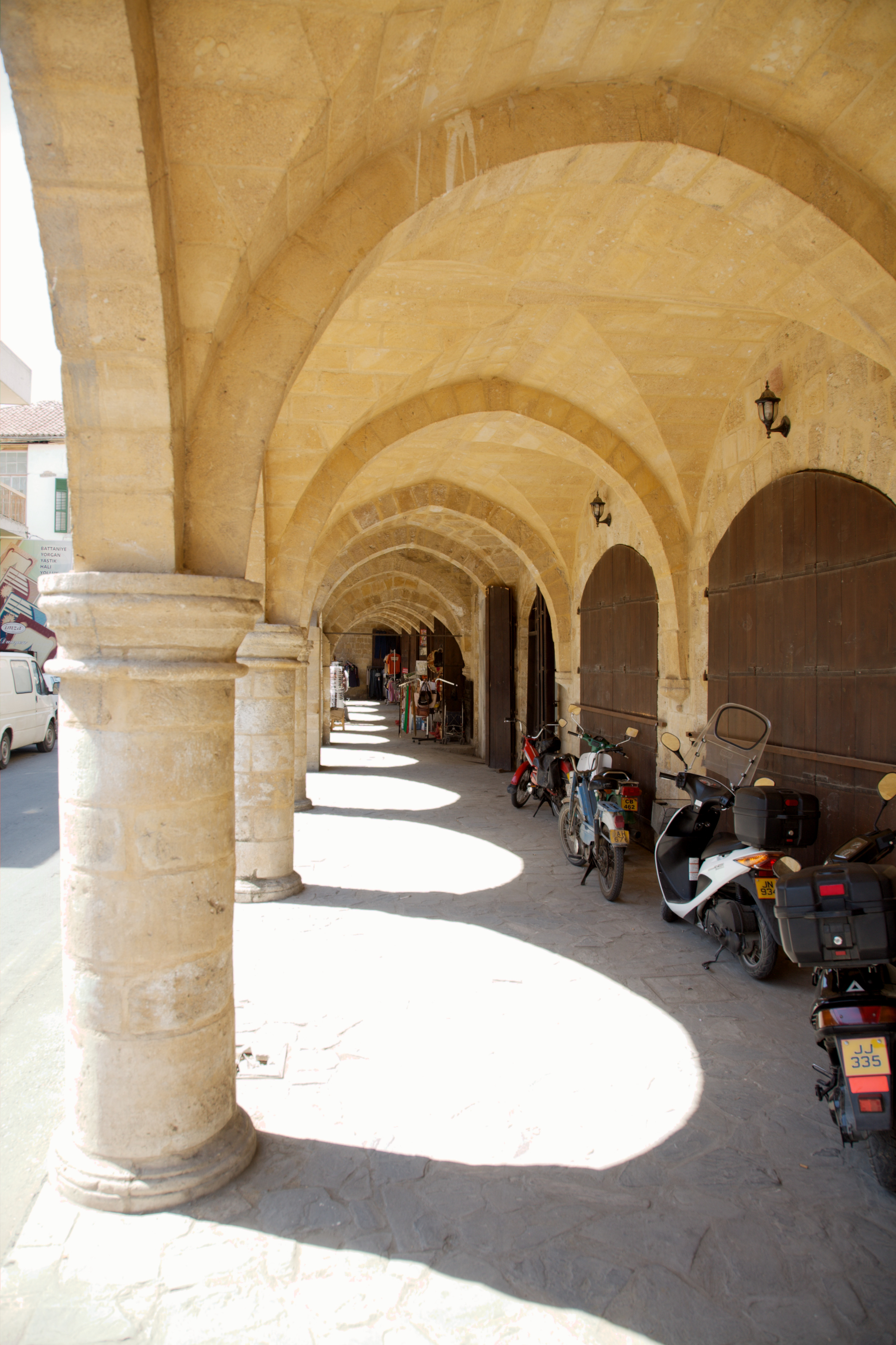

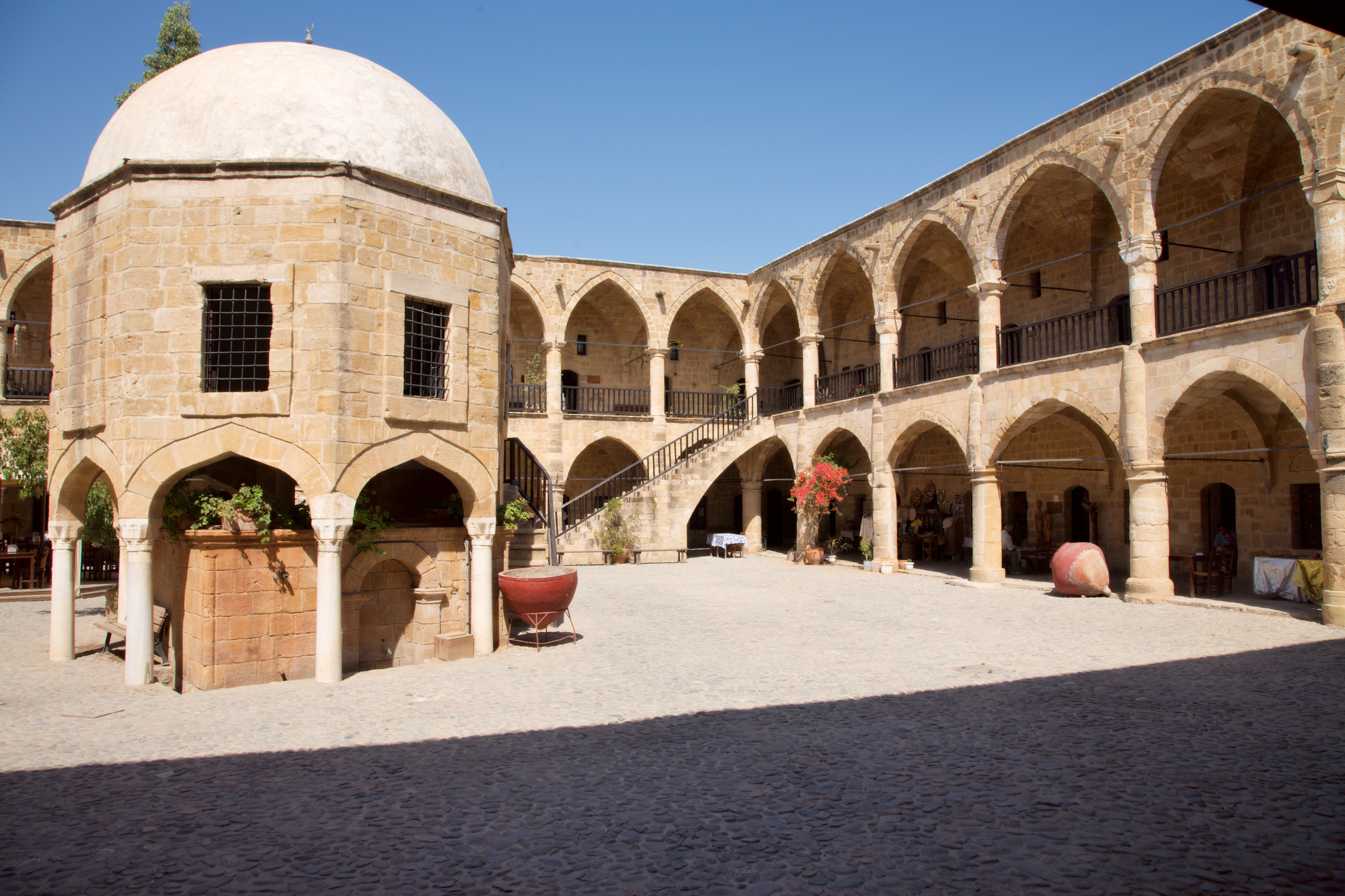

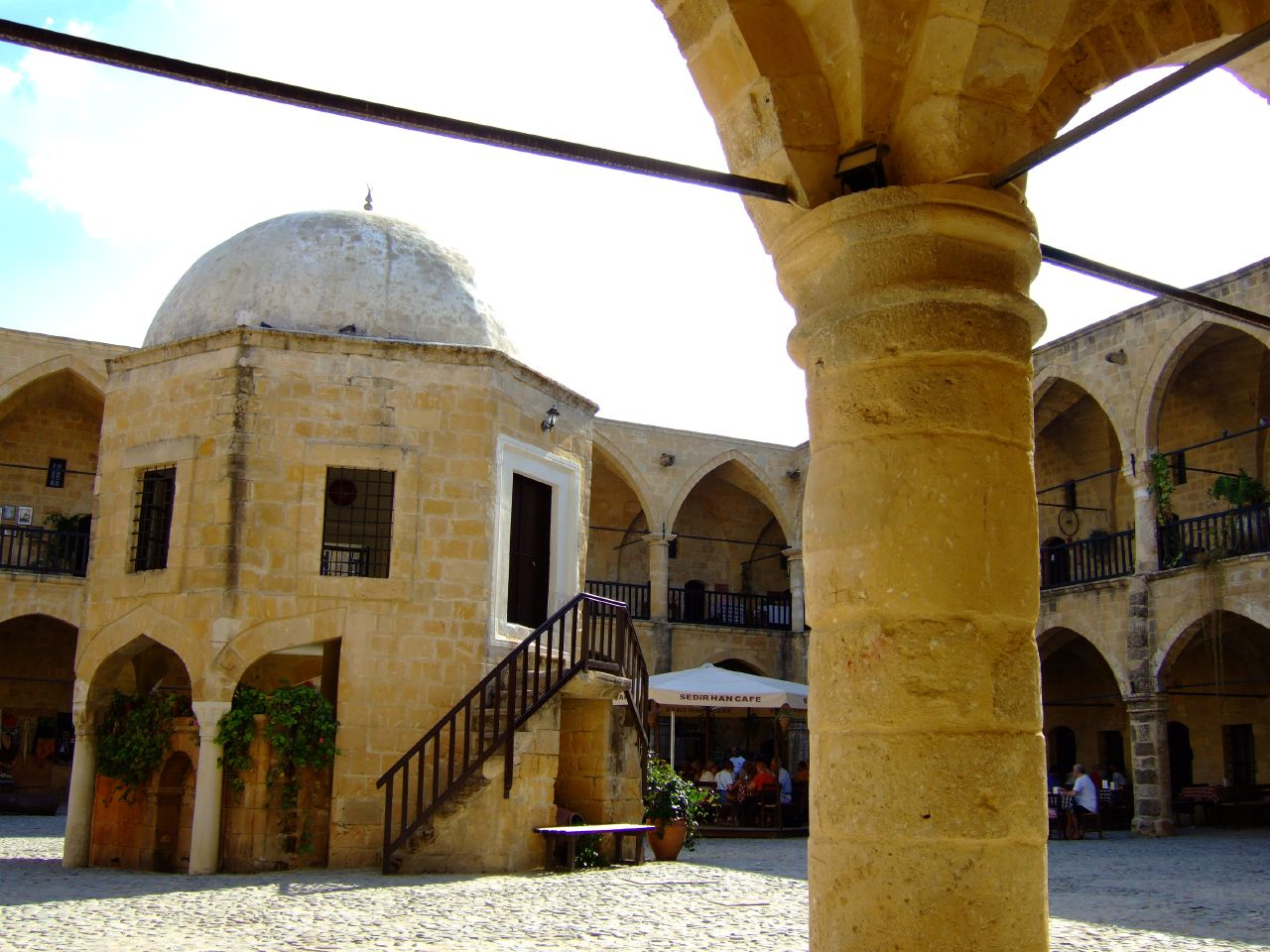

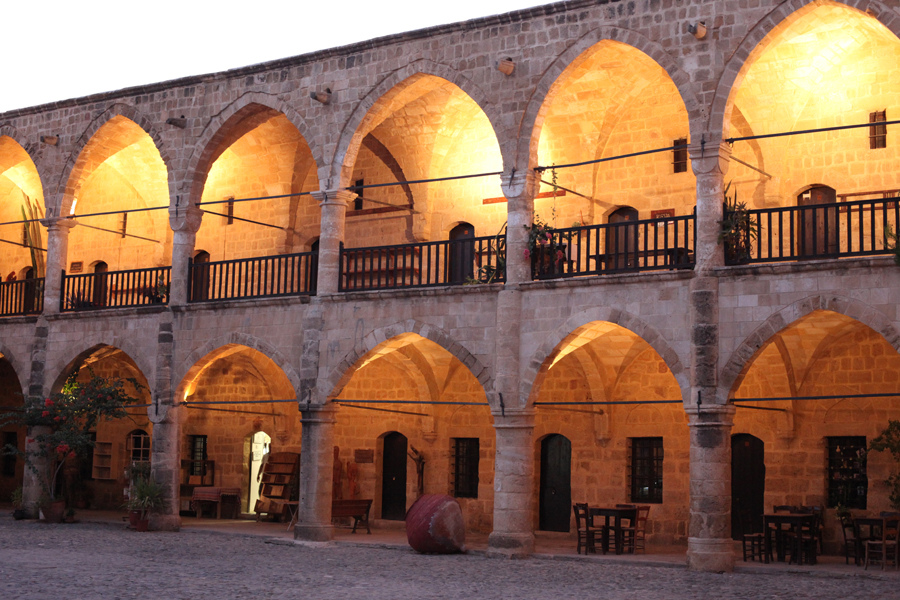

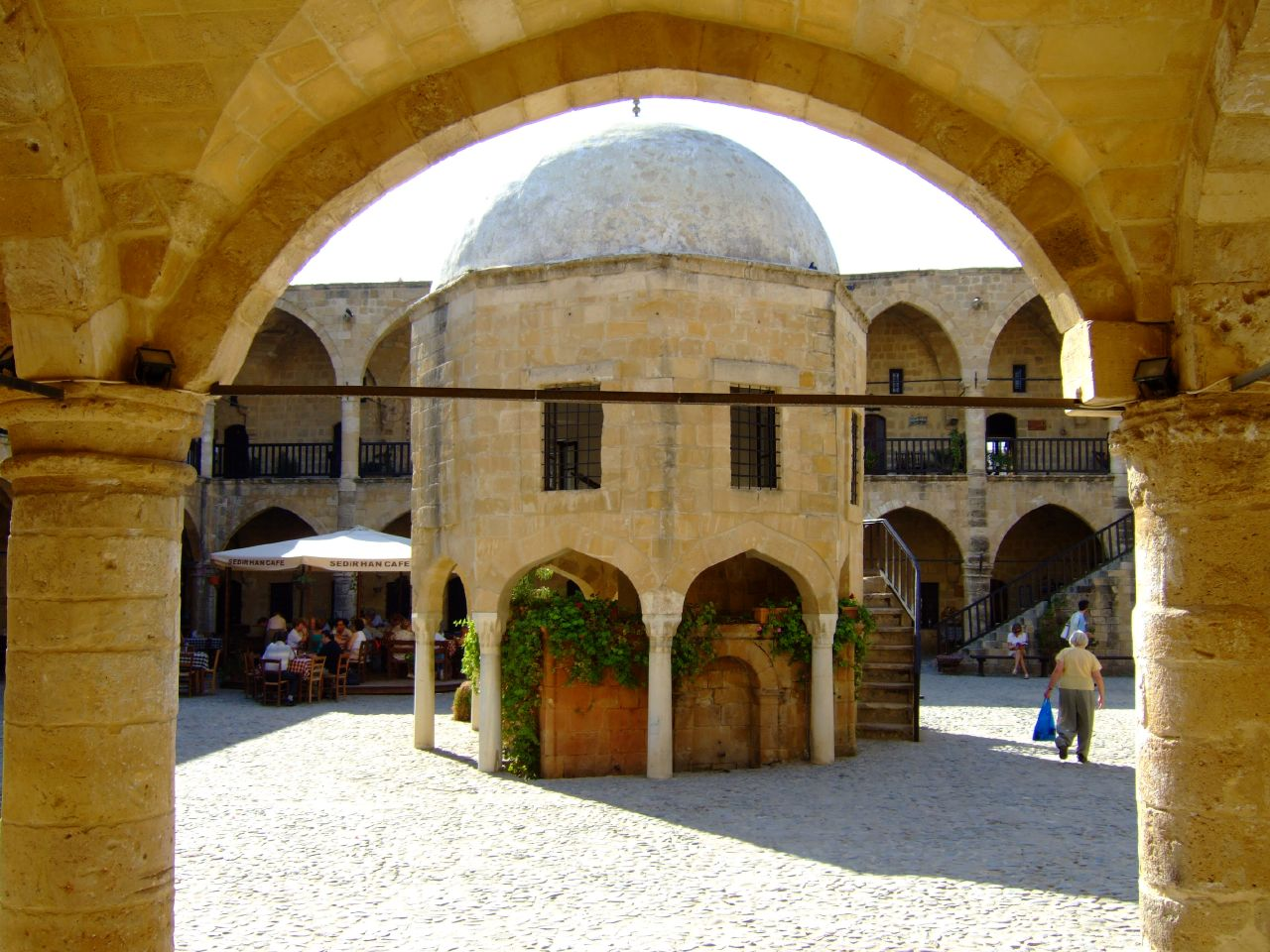

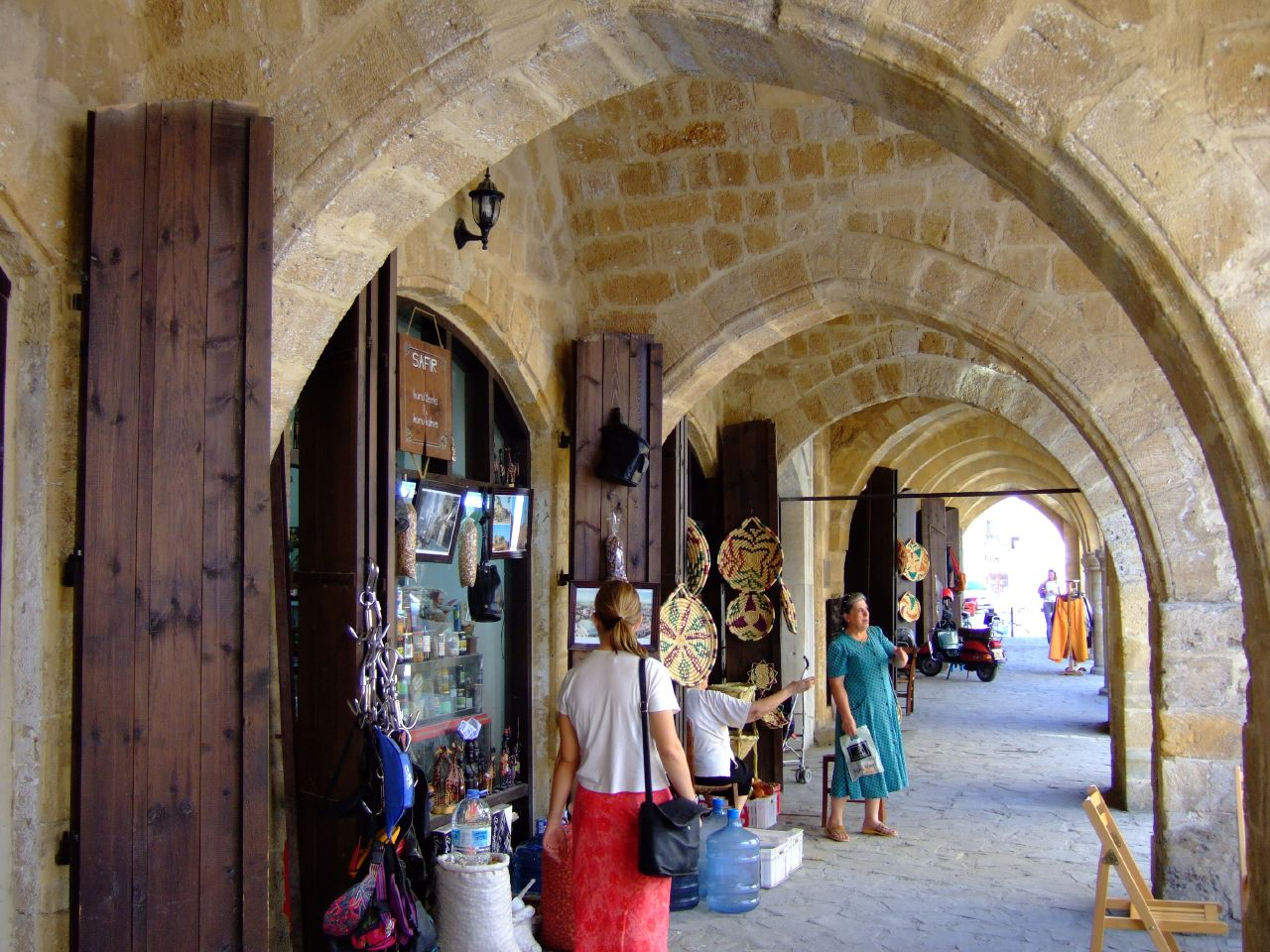

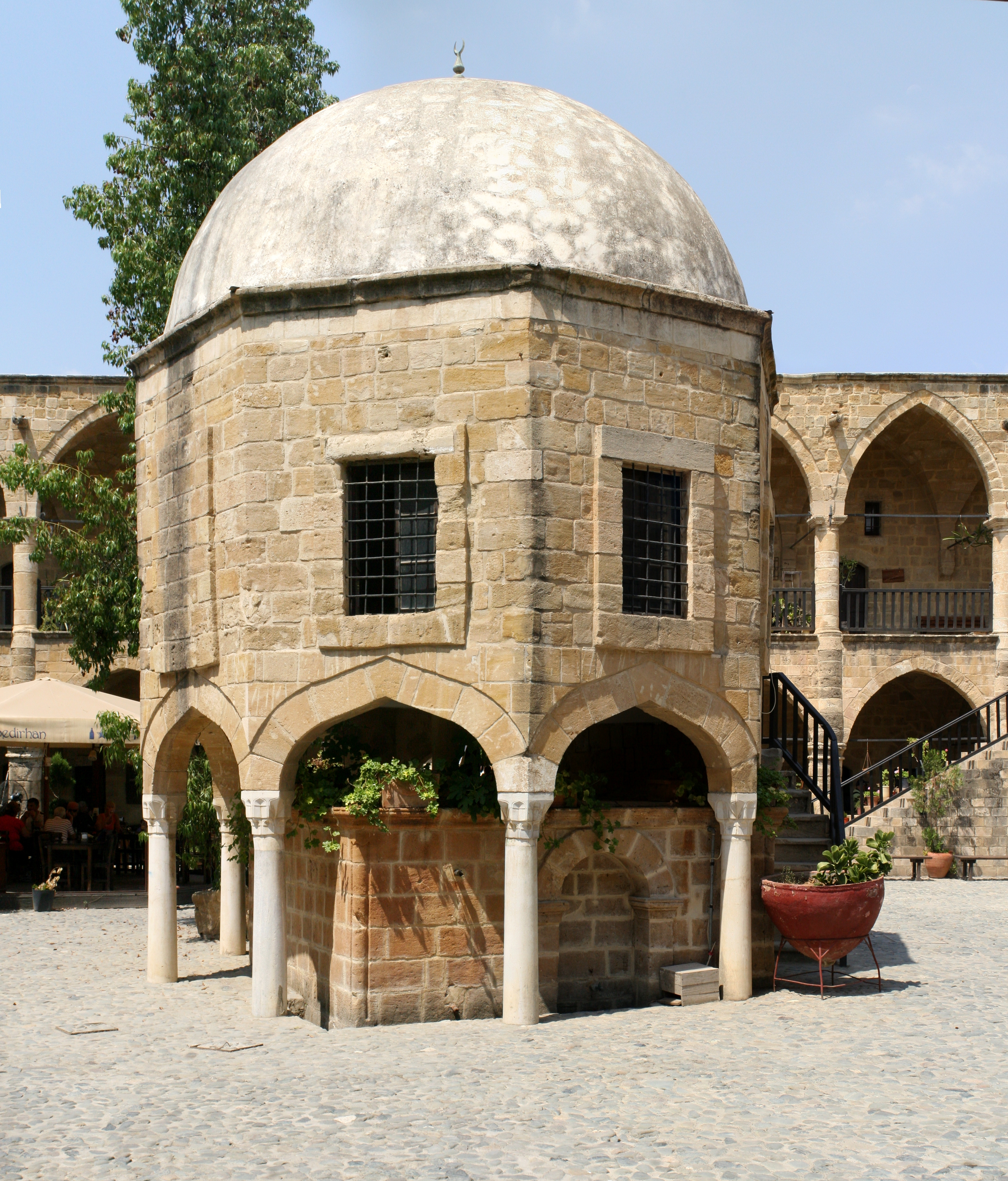

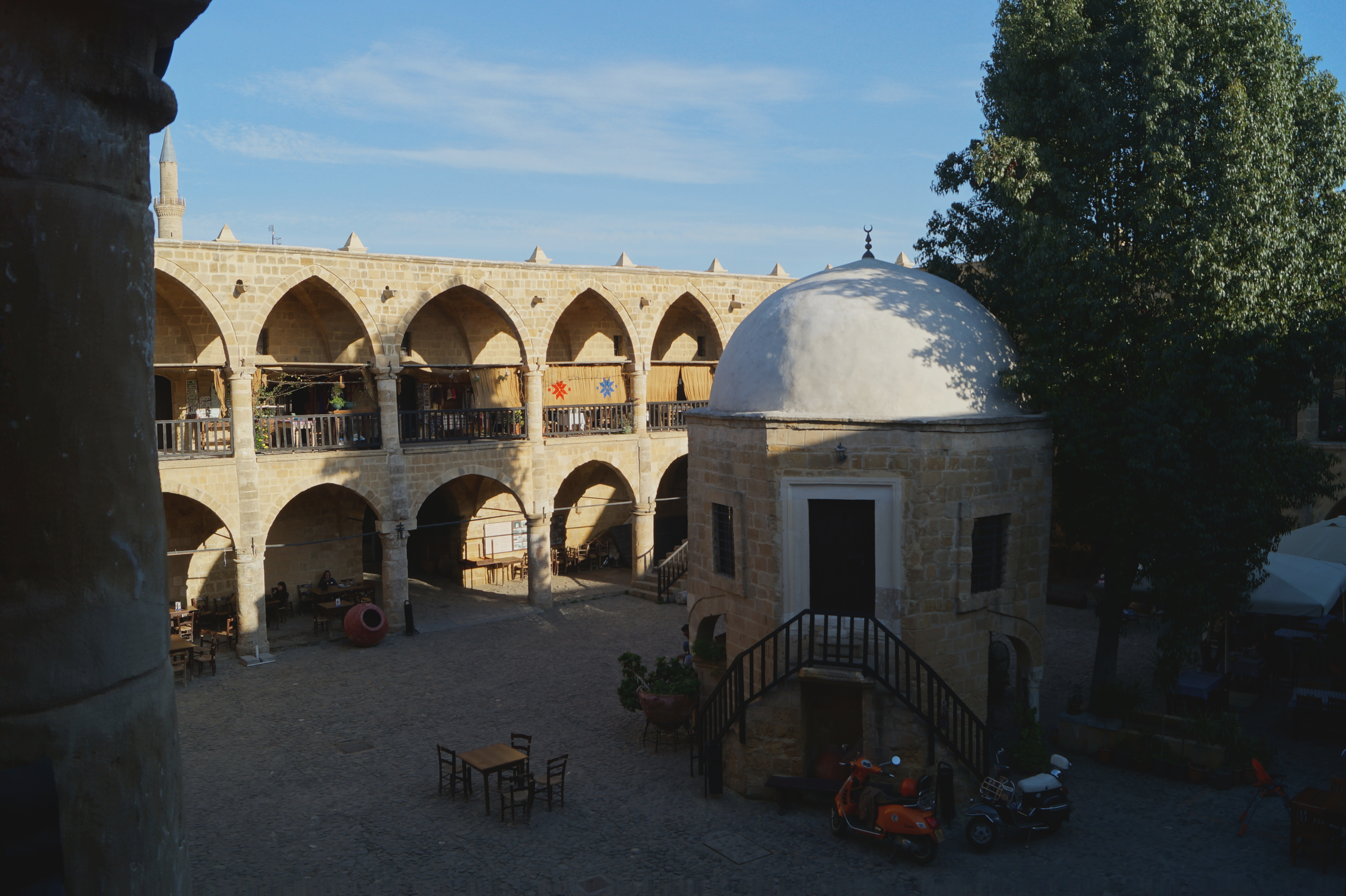

== See also ==
- Kumarcilar Han

== Bibliography ==
- Bağışkan, Tuncer (2005), Kıbrıs'ta Osmanlı Türk Eserleri, Turkish Cypriot Association of Museum Lovers, pp. 321–4
- Barut, Pınar (20 October 2019). "Büyük Han'da Çin istilası". Havadis. Archived from the original on 21 October 2019.
- Darke, Diana (2009), North Cyprus, Bradt Travel Guides, ISBN 1-84162-244-3.
- Dubin, Marc; Morris, Damien (2002), Cyprus, Rough Guides, ISBN 1-85828-863-0.
- Eyice, Semavi (1992). "Büyük Han" (PDF). İslam Ansiklopedisi (in Turkish). Vol. 6. Türk Diyanet Vakfı. pp. 514–5.
- Ertuğ, Mehmet (2016), Gizemli Büyük Han (Dünü-Bugünü), Lefkoşa: Kıbrıs Türk Yazarlar Birliği Yayınları
