= Greek Cypriots =

Ethnic Greek population of Cyprus

Greek Cypriots Ελληνοκύπριοι
Total population
- c. 1.2 million

Regions with significant populations
- Cyprus 737,196 (2023 census) ≈500,000 in diaspora (2011 estimate)
- United Kingdom: 270,000
- Australia, South Africa, Greece, United States, Germany and others: ≈230,000

Languages
- Modern Greek (Cypriot and Standard)

Religion
- Christianity (Greek Orthodox)

Related ethnic groups
- Other Greek subgroups

Greek Cypriots (Greek: Ελληνοκύπριοι, romanized: Ellinokýprioi) are the ethnic Greek population of Cyprus, forming the island's largest ethnolinguistic community. According to the 2023 census, 719,252 respondents recorded their ethnicity as Greek, forming almost 99% of the 737,196 Cypriot citizens and over 77.9% of the 923,381 total residents of the area controlled by the Republic of Cyprus. These figures do not include the 29,321 citizens of Greece residing in Cyprus, ethnic Greeks recorded as citizens of other countries, or the population of the occupied Northern Cyprus.

The majority of Greek Cypriots are members of the Church of Cyprus, an autocephalous Greek Orthodox Church within the wider communion of Orthodox Christianity. In regard to the 1960 Constitution of Cyprus, the term also includes Maronites, Armenians, and Catholics of the Latin Church ("Latins"), who were given the option of being included in either the Greek or Turkish communities and voted to join the former due to a shared religion.

== History ==
=== Ancient Cyprus ===
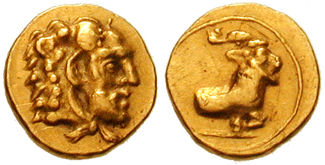
King Evagoras I of Salamis, Cyprus

Cyprus was part of the Mycenaean civilization with local production of Mycenaean vases dating to the Late Helladic III (1400–1050 BC). The quantity of this pottery concludes that there were numerous Mycenaean settlers, if not settlements, on the island. Archaeological evidence shows that Greek settlement began unsystematically in c. 1400 BC, then steadied (possibly due to Dorian invaders on the mainland) with definite settlements established in c. 1200 BC. The close connection between the Arcadian dialect and those of Pamphylia and Cyprus indicates that the migration came from Achaea. The Achaean tribe may have been an original population of the Peloponnese, Pamphylia, and Cyprus, living in the latter prior to the Dorian invasion, and not a subsequent immigrant group; the Doric elements in Arcadian are lacking in Cypriot. Achaeans settled among the old population, and founded Salamis. The epic Cypria, dating to the 7th century BC, may have originated in Cyprus.

=== Medieval Cyprus ===
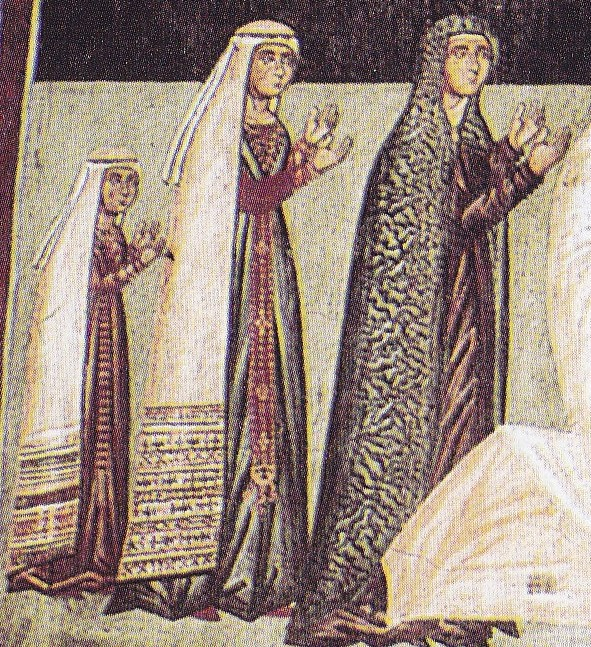
Byzantine princess Helena Palaiologina, Queen consort of Cyprus

The Byzantine era profoundly molded Greek Cypriot culture. The institution of Greek Orthodox Christianity soon became an integral part of Greek Cypriot identity during this period, and its legacy persisted under foreign domination throughout the succeeding centuries. Since Cyprus was never the "final goal" of any external ambitions – insofar as destroying its civilisation and citizenry did not become a military objective, or necessity – the island simply fell under the dominion of whichever power controlled the Eastern Mediterranean region at the time.

Greek Cypriots did, however, endure oppressive rule under both the Lusignans and successive Venetian Republic, from the 1190s to 1570. King Aimery – whom succeeded his brother, Guy of Lusignan, in 1194 – was known for being particularly intolerant of the Orthodox Church, and saw Greek Cypriot land appropriated for use by newly-established Latin churches in major towns on the island. In addition, oppressive taxation was imposed upon locals by occupying forces, with tax collection conducted, by proxy, under administration of the Latin churches.

=== Ottoman Cyprus ===
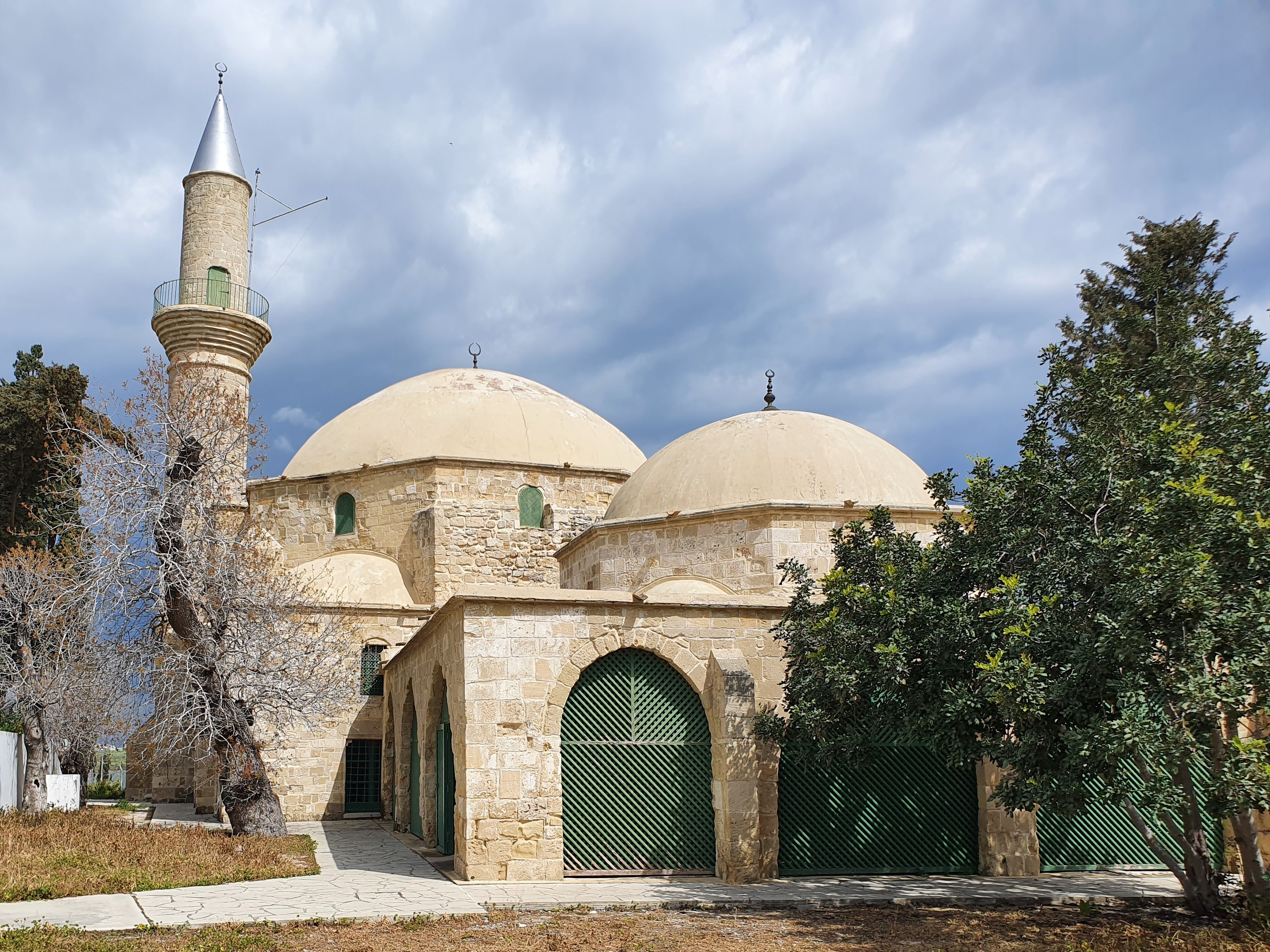
The Hala Sultan Tekke mosque, built in 1817, was one of many landmarks constructed by the Ottoman Turks in Cyprus.

The Ottoman conquest of Cyprus in 1571 replaced Venetian rule. Despite the inherent oppression of foreign subjugation, the period of Ottoman rule (1570–1878) had a limited impact on Greek Cypriot culture. The Ottomans tended to administer their multicultural empire with the help of their subject millets, or religious communities. The millet system allowed the Greek Cypriot community to survive, administered on behalf of Constantinople by the Archbishop of the Church of Cyprus. Cypriot Greeks were now able to take control of the land they had been working on for centuries. Although religiously tolerant, Ottoman rule was generally harsh and inefficient. The patriarch serving the Ottoman sultan acted as ethnarch, or leader of the Greek nation, and gained secular powers as a result of the gradual dysfunction of Ottoman rule, for instance in adjudicating justice and in the collection of taxes. Turkish settlers suffered alongside their Greek Cypriot neighbors, and the two groups together endured centuries of oppressive governance from Constantinople. A minority of Greek Cypriots converted to Islam during this period, and are sometimes referred to as "neo-Muslims" by historians.

=== Modern history ===
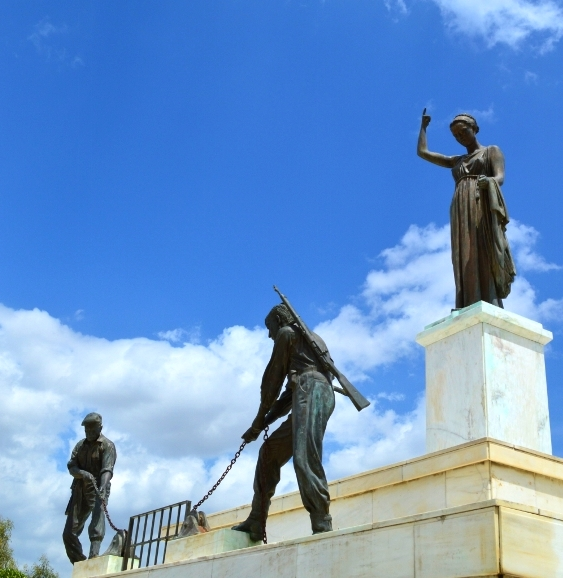
The Cypriot Statue of Liberty

Politically, the concept of enosis – unification with the Greek "motherland" – became important to literate Greek Cypriots after Greece declared its independence from the Ottoman Empire in 1821. A movement for the realization of enosis gradually formed, in which the Church of Cyprus played a dominant role during the Cyprus dispute.

"Hellenism is a race as aged as the world,
Nobody could be found to eliminate it,
Nobody, for it is protected from above by my God,
Hellenism will be lost, only when the world is gone."

— Archbishop Kyprianos' fictional response to Kucuk Mehmet's threat to execute the Greek Orthodox Christian bishops of Cyprus, in Vasilis Michaelides' epic poem "The 9th of July of 1821 in Nicosia, Cyprus", written in 1884–1895. The poem is considered a key literary expression of Greek Cypriot Enosis sentiment.

During the period of British colonial rule (1878–1960), an efficient colonial administration was established, but government and education were administered along ethnic lines, accentuating differences. For example, the education system was organized with two Boards of Education, one Greek and one Turkish, controlled by Athens and Istanbul, respectively. The resulting Greco-Turkish educational systems emphasized linguistic, religious, cultural, and ethnic differences and downplayed traditional ties between the two Cypriot communities. The two groups were encouraged to view themselves as extensions of their respective motherlands, leading to the development of two distinct nationalities with antagonistic loyalties.

The importance of religion within the Greek Cypriot community was reinforced when the Archbishop of the Church of Cyprus, Makarios III, was elected the first president of the Republic of Cyprus in 1960. For the next decade and a half, enosis was a key issue for Greek Cypriots, and a key cause of events leading up to the 1974 coup, which prompted the Turkish invasion and occupation of the northern part of the island. Cyprus remains divided today, with the two communities almost completely separated. Many of those whom lost their homes, lands and possessions during the Turkish invasion, emigrated mainly to the United Kingdom, United States, Australia, South Africa and Europe, although most left Cyprus before 1974. There are today estimated to be 335,000 Greek Cypriot emigrants living in Great Britain. The majority of the Greek Cypriots in Great Britain currently live in England; there is an estimate of around 3,000 in Wales and 1,000 in Scotland. By the early 1990s, Greek Cypriot society enjoyed a high standard of living. Economic modernization created a more flexible and open society and caused Greek Cypriots to share the concerns and hopes of other secularized West European societies. The Republic of Cyprus joined the European Union in 2004, officially representing the entire island, but suspended for the time being in Turkish-occupied northern Cyprus.

== Population ==
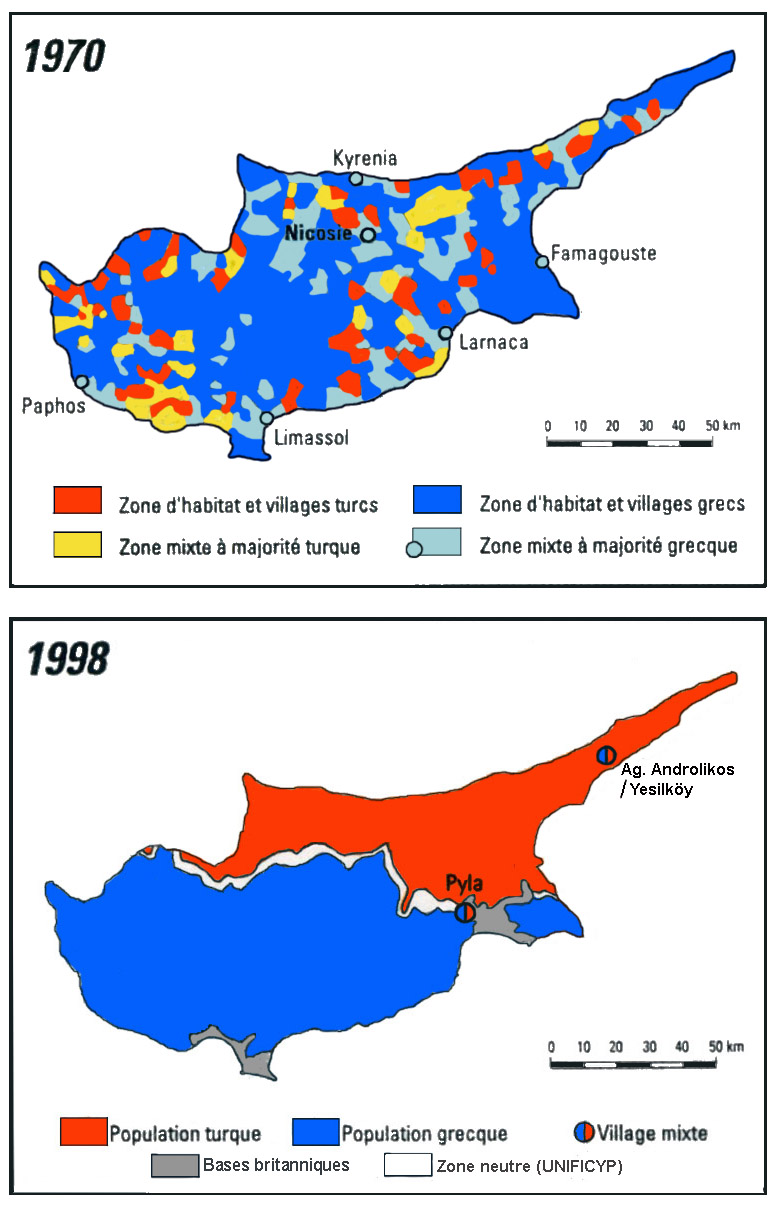
1970 vs. 1998: Greeks are blue, and Turks are red

Greeks in Cyprus number 659,115, according to the 2011 Cypriot census. There is a notable community of Cypriots and people of Cypriot descent in Greece. In Athens, the Greek Cypriot community numbers ca. 55,000 people. There is also a large Greek Cypriot diaspora, particularly in the United Kingdom.

== Culture ==
=== Cuisine ===
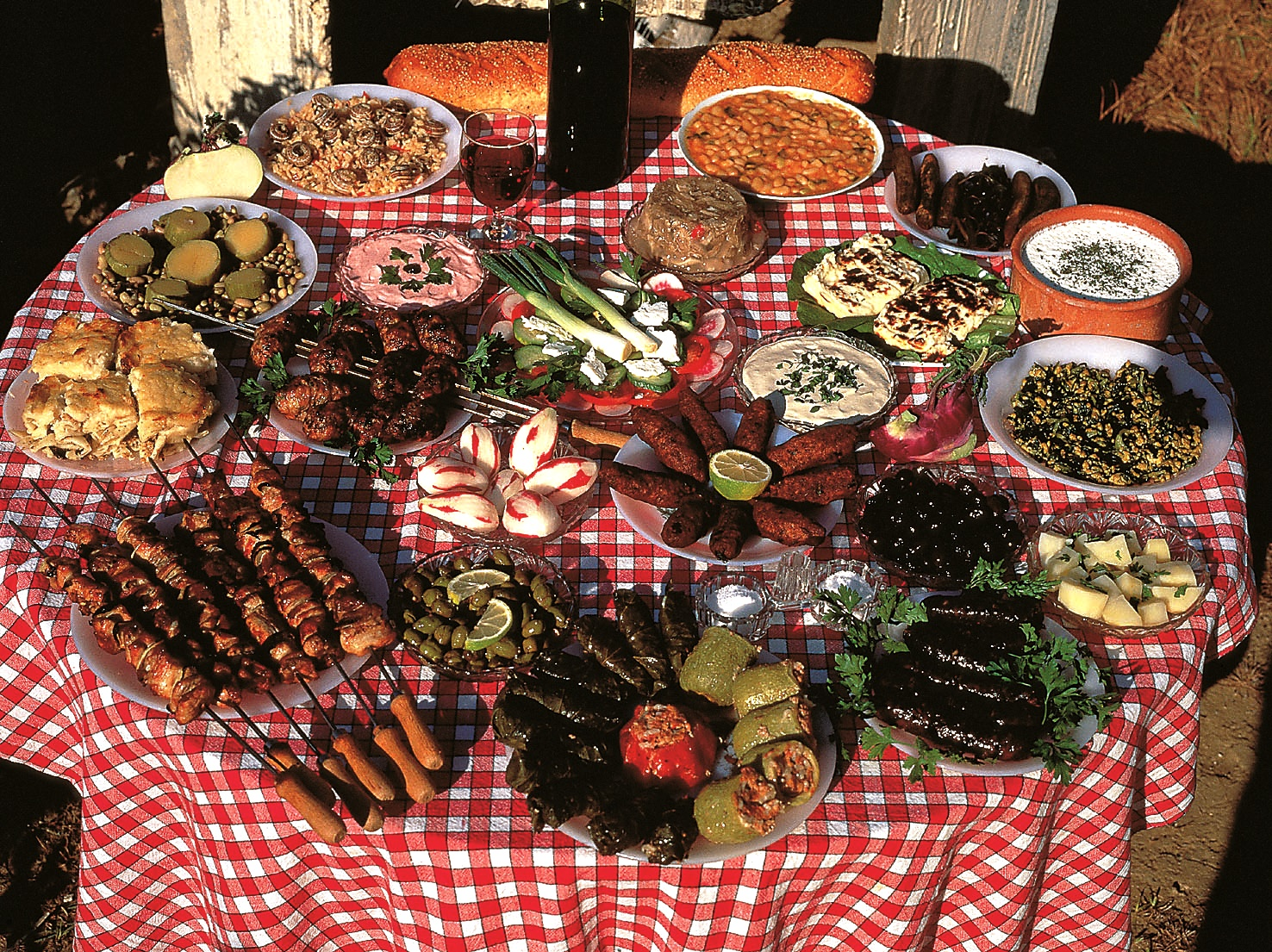
Cypriot meze

Cypriot cuisine, as with other Greek cuisine, was imprinted with the spices and herbs made common as a result of extensive trade links within the Ottoman Empire. Names of many dishes came to reflect the sources of the ingredients from the many lands. Coffee houses pervasively spread throughout the island into all major towns and countless villages.

=== Language ===
The everyday language of Greek Cypriots is Cypriot Greek, a dialect of Modern Greek. It shares certain characteristics with varieties of Crete, the Dodecanese and Chios, as well as those of Asia Minor.

Greek Cypriots are generally educated in Standard Modern Greek, though they tend to speak it with an accent and preserve some Greek Cypriot grammar.

== Genetic studies ==
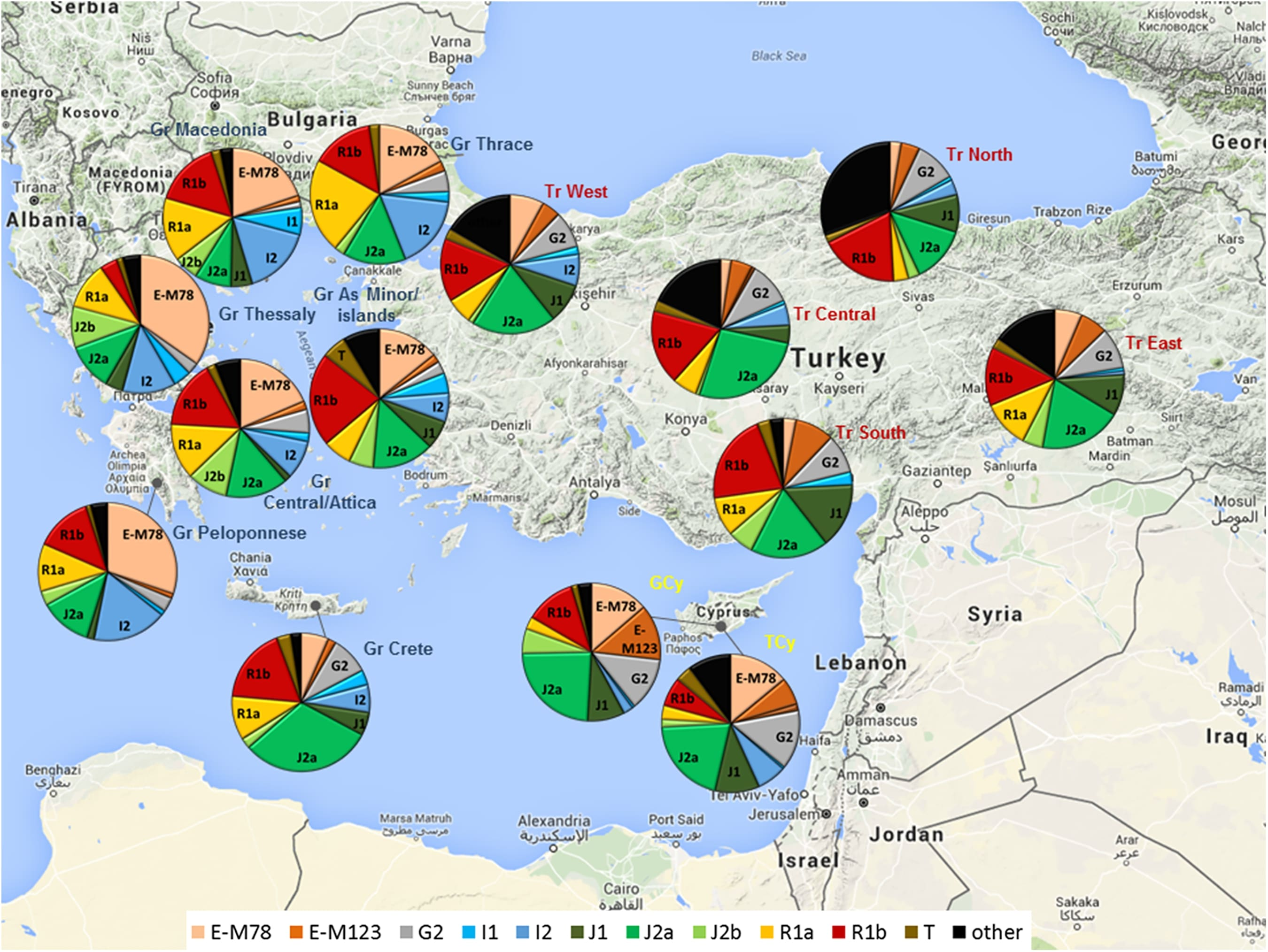
Y-DNA comparison of Turkish and Greek-speaking populations of Cyprus, Anatolia, Thrace, the Aegean, and peninsular Greece

A 2017 study, found that Cypriots belong to a wide and homogeneous genetic domain, along with the people of the Aegean Islands (including Crete), Sicily, and southern Italy (including the Greek-speaking minorities of Apulia and Calabria), while the continental part of Greece, including Peloponnesus, appears as slightly differentiated, by clustering with the other Southern Balkan populations of Albania and Kosovo. The study calls this distinct genetic domain, the "Mediterranean genetic continuum".

A 2017 archaeogenetics study, concluded that both the Mycenaean Greeks and the Minoans were genetically closely related, and that both are closely related, but not identical, to modern Greek populations. The F_{ST} between the sampled Bronze Age populations and present-day West Eurasians was estimated, finding that Mycenaeans are least differentiated from the populations of Greece, Cyprus, Albania, and Italy.

A 2017 study, found that both Greek Cypriots' and Turkish Cypriots' patrilineal ancestry derives primarily from a single pre-Ottoman local gene pool. The frequency of total haplotypes shared (Note: Shared haplotype % represents the proportion of individuals among Greek Cypriots (344 samples) and Turkish Cypriots (380 samples) having an exact 17/17 Y-STR haplotype match in the specified populations.) between Greek and Turkish Cypriots is 7-8%, with analysis showing that none of these being found in Turkey, thus not supporting a Turkish origin for the shared haplotypes. No shared haplotypes were observed between Greek Cypriots and mainland Turkish populations, while total haplotypes shared between Turkish Cypriots and mainland Turks was 3%. Both Cypriot groups show close genetic affinity to Calabrian (southern Italy) and Lebanese patrilineages. The study states that the genetic affinity between Calabrians and Cypriots can be explained as a result of a common ancient Greek (Achaean) genetic contribution, while Lebanese affinity can be explained through several migrations that took place from coastal Levant to Cyprus from the Neolithic (early farmers), the Iron Age (Phoenicians), and the Middle Ages (Maronites and other Levantine settlers during the Frankish era). The authors note however that the Calabrian samples used in the analysis were relatively small (n = 30 comparative dataset, n = 74 YHRD) and thus these results should be interpreted with caution. Furthermore, from the Greek sub-populations, Cretan Greeks were found to be the closest to Cypriots. In terms of Rst pairwise genetic differences, which indicate deeper shared paternal ancestry than shared haplotypes, Greeks appear genetically close to Cypriots, and equidistant from Greek and Turkish Cypriots. Both Greek and Turkish Cypriots have similar frequencies for their major patrilineal haplogroups, with the main subclades for both being J2a-M410 (23.8% and 20.3% resp.), E-M78 (12.8% and 13.9% resp.) and G2-P287 (12.5% and 13.7% resp.). The biggest differentiating characteristic between Greek Cypriots and mainland Greeks is the low frequency of haplogroups I, R1a among Greek Cypriots because the mainland Greek population has received considerable migrations during the Byzantine era and the Middle Ages from other Balkanic populations, such as Slavs, Aromanians (Vlachs), and Albanians (Arvanites), while the biggest differentiating characteristic between Greek Cypriots and Middle Easterners is the much lower frequency of haplogroup J1 among the Greek Cypriots. Greek Cypriots are also differentiated by Turkish Cypriots in some aspects; namely Turkish Cypriots have 5.6% Eastern Eurasian (likely Central Asian/Turkic) and 2.1% North African patrilineal ancestry, while Greek Cypriots have 0.6% Eastern Eurasian and no North African patrilineal ancestry.

== Notable people ==
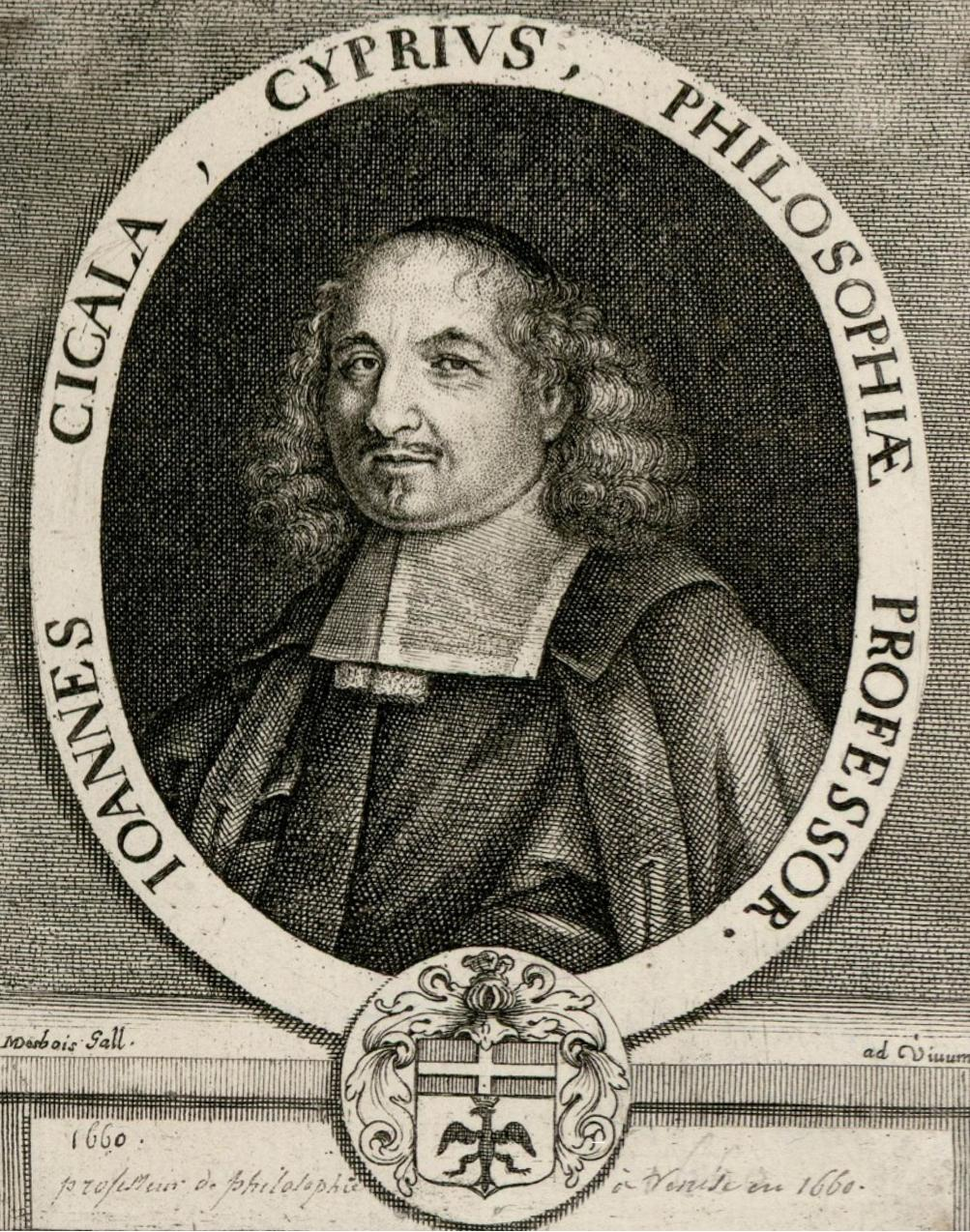
Ioannis Kigalas (1622–1687), Nicosian-born scholar and professor of Philosophy who was largely active in Padova and Venice.

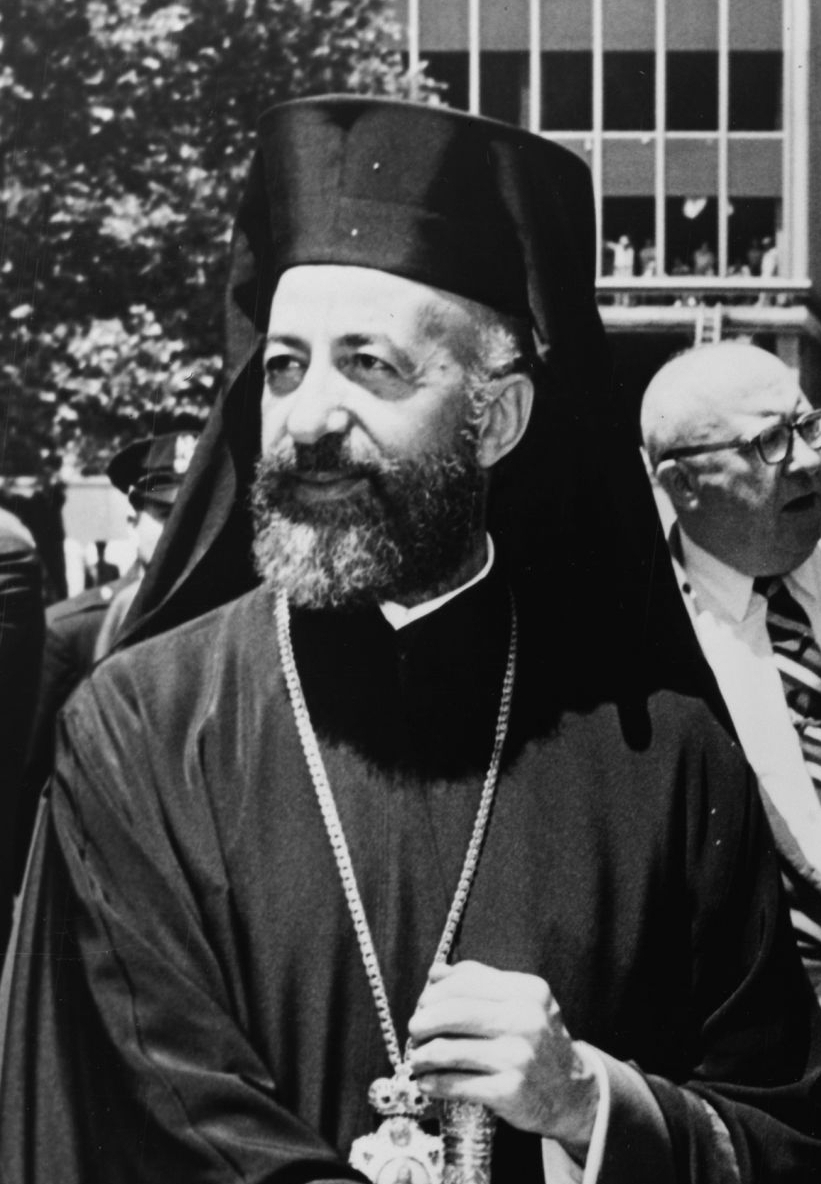
Makarios III

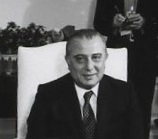
Spyros Kyprianou, President of Cyprus

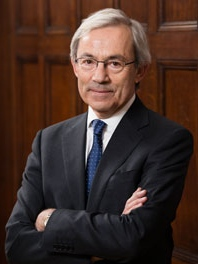
Christopher A. Pissarides

=== Ancient ===
- Acesas, Salaminian weaver
- Apollodorus, Kitian physician
- Apollonios of Kition, 1st-century BCE physician of the Empiric school
- Clearchus of Soli, 4th- and 3rd-century BCE Peripatetic philosopher
- Demonax, 2nd CE Cynic philosopher
- Evagoras I, king of Salamis 411–374 BCE
- Evagoras II, king of Salamis 361–351 BCE
- Nicocles, king of Paphos
- Nicocles, king of Salamis 374/3–361 BC
- Nikokreon, king of Salamis
- Onesilus, king of Salamis 499–497 BC
- Paeon of Amathus, Hellenistic historian
- Persaeus, 3rd-century BCE Stoic philosopher, student of Zeno
- Pnytagoras, king of Salamis
- Stasanor, 4th-century BCE general of Alexander the Great
- Stasander, 4th-century BCE general of Alexander the Great
- Stasinos, poet, author of the epic poem Cypria
- Synnesis of Cyprus, 4th-century BCE physician
- Zeno of Citium, 3rd-century BCE philosopher, founder of the Stoic school of philosophy
- Ptolemy of Cyprus, 1st-century BCE Ptolemaic king of Cyprus
- Zeno of Cyprus, 4th-century CE physician

=== Medieval ===
- Saint Spyridon, 4th-century bishop of Trimythous
- Saint Tychon, 4th-century bishop of Amathus
- Theodora, 6th-century empress of the Eastern Roman Empire
- John the Merciful, 7th century Amathusian Patriatch of Alexandria
- Neophytos of Cyprus, 13th-century monk
- Leontios Machairas, 15th-century historian
- Georgios Boustronios, 15th-century historian
- Thomas Flanginis, 17th-century merchant and founder of the Flanginian School
- Ioannis Kigalas, 17th-century scholar and professor

=== Modern ===
- Alkinoos Ioannidis, musician, born in Nicosia
- Andreas G. Orphanides, professor of archaeology, rector and composer
- Anna Vissi, singer, musician, actress born in Larnaca
- Anthony Skordi, actor
- Artemas Diamandis, British-Cypriot singer
- Aristos Petrou, Cypriot-American rapper, member of the rap duo Suicideboys
- Andrekos Varnava, Australian-Cypriot historian, writer, and professor at Flinders University
- Cat Stevens, British-Cypriot singer-songwriter, Greek Cypriot father
- Christopher A. Pissarides, Cypriot economist, Nobel laureate, born in Nicosia
- Christy Lefteri, British-Cypriot novelist
- Chris Tsangarides, Grammy-nominated record producer, sound engineer, and mixer of Greek Cypriot origin
- Demetri Catrakilis, South African rugby union player
- Demis Hassabis, artificial intelligence researcher, Greek Cypriot father
- Drew Pavlou, Australian anti-CCP activist
- George Kallis, composer
- George Michael, English singer-songwriter, Greek Cypriot father
- George Eugeniou, founder and artistic director of Art Theatre, London
- Georgios Grivas, military officer
- George Vassiliou, President of Cyprus from 1988 to 1993
- George Young, Greek Cypriot actor
- Grigoris Afxentiou, guerrilla fighter
- Grigoris Kastanos
- Jamie Demetriou, comedian, actor, screenwriter
- Kypros Nicolaides, Professor in Fetal Medicine at King's College Hospital, London
- Kyriakos Charalambides
- Lambros Lambrou (footballer)
- Lambros Lambrou (skier)
- Manos Loïzos, composer
- Marios Tokas, composer
- Makarios III, archbishop and first President of Cyprus
- Marcos Baghdatis, tennis player
- Michael Cacoyannis, cinema director
- Michalis Hatzigiannis, singer
- Mick Karn, musician
- Mihalis Violaris, singer
- Natasia Demetriou, comedian, actor, screenwriter
- Nico Yennaris
- Panikos Panayi, British-Cypriot historian, writer, and professor at De Montfort University
- Paul Stassino
- Petros Serghiou Florides, mathematical physicist
- Roys Poyiadjis
- Sotiris Moustakas, actor
- Stelios Haji-Ioannou, entrepreneur
- Stass Paraskos, artist
- Stel Pavlou, English writer, Greek Cypriot father
- Theo Paphitis
- Tio Ellinas
- Tonia Buxton
- Vasilis Michaelides, poet
- Vassilis Hatzipanagis, football player

== See also ==
- Cyprus–Greece relations
- Cypriot Australians
- Greek Cypriot diaspora
- Turkish Cypriots
- Greek Britons
- List of Cypriots
- Cappadocian Greeks
- Greeks in New Zealand
- Pontic Greeks

== Sources ==
- Madianou, Mirca (12 November 2012). Mediating the Nation. Routledge. pp. 40–. ISBN 978-1-136-61105-6.
- Quataert, Donald The Ottoman Empire 1700–1922 Cambridge University Press ISBN 0-521-83910-6
