= Nicocles =

Nicocles (Greek: Νικοκλῆς, Nikokles) may refer to:

- Nicocles of Salamis (reigned from 374/3 BC), king of Salamis in Cyprus
- Nicocles of Paphos (d. 306 BC), king of Paphos in Cyprus
- Nicocles of Sicyon (reigned 251 BC), tyrant of Sicyon
- Nicocles (fly), a genus of robber flies
