= Cypriot Diaspora =

Cypriot Diaspora may refer to:

- Greek Cypriot diaspora
- Turkish Cypriot diaspora
