= Cypriot Australians =

Κύπριοι Αυστραλοί (Greek), Kıbrıslı Avustralyalılar (Turkish)
- (Cyprus) (Australia)

Total population
- Cypriot Australians; 16,929 (by birth, 2016); 28,991 (by ancestry, 2016); Over 80,000 (estimate, 2014)

Regions with significant populations
- Cyprus-born people by state or territory
- Victoria: 7,573
- New South Wales: 6,236
- South Australia: 1,178
- Queensland: 1,162
- Tasmania: 62

Languages
- Greek · Turkish · English

Religion
- 67% Orthodox · 15% Islam

Related ethnic groups
- Greek Australians · Turkish Australians · British Cypriots · Cypriot Americans ·

Cypriot Australians (Greek: Κύπριοι της Αυστραλίας; Turkish: Avustralyalı Kıbrıslı) are Australian citizens of Cypriot descent or Cypriot born people who reside in Australia. Cypriots in Australia are the second largest Cypriot community outside of Cyprus and Greece. The cultural group is found throughout Australia, with a presence in all state capitals. According to the 2016 Australian Census, there were 28,000 people of Cypriot descent in Australia and 16,929 Cyprus-born people residing in the country at the moment of the census. As of 2014, there are over 80,000 people of Cypriot origin in Australia. Cypriot Australians have lived in Australia since the early 1850s, predominantly residing in Melbourne and Sydney. Since the beginning of the 21st century, education and employment levels of Cypriot Australian individuals have improved, becoming more similar to that of non migrant Australians. The culture and traditions of Cypriot Australians have been maintained overtime. Most Cypriot Australians are of Greek background. Many intermarry with other Greek Australians.

== Immigration history ==
=== Early years: 1850s–1930s ===
Migration from the Eastern Mediterranean Island to Australia has been traced back to the middle of the 19th Century, at the time of the Australian Gold Rushes. The earliest Cypriot individuals who migrated to Australia settled into the mining towns of Ballarat and Daylesford in Victoria, North-west of Melbourne. During the 1850s, the population worked mostly as miners and as labourers. With the colonial period of Australia from 1788 to 1901 creating extremely strong bonds between Australia and the United Kingdom, the ceding of Cyprus to the Commonwealth by the Ottomans in 1878 promoted large influxes of Cypriot migration into Australia. During the 19th century, the majority of Cypriot Australian migrants were males who entered Australia aboard British ships as crewmen.

By the beginning of the 20th century, many migrants had upskilled and established businesses which existed mostly in Melbourne and Sydney. The Australian census of 1933 estimated that approximately 500 Cypriot born individuals lived in Australia. 8000 Cypriot born people lived in the United Kingdom before the beginning of World War 2. The small Cypriot born population of Australia existed as a result of the presence of the United Kingdom, which attracted the majority of Europe's migrants for all of the 19th century and the majority of the 20th century. The more highly developed infrastructure in the United Kingdom compared to Australia, as well as the close proximity to Cyprus were the primary factors which influenced migrant influxes to the UK as opposed to Australia prior to the second World War.

In 1930, there were no Turkish Cypriot born migrants living in Australia. The first notable influx of Turkish Cypriot migration occurred in September 1947, following the Second World War. Prior to 1940, 3 Cypriot migrants acknowledged Turkish to be their primary language, compared to almost 1000 claiming Greek as their native tongue at the same time. Migration was extremely difficult for many Turkish Cypriots as a result of the implementation of the White Australia Policy. The White Australia policy aimed to disallow any non European migration into Australia. The policies introduced was more accepting of Greek Cypriots from Europe than the Turkish Cypriot population, which had much closer relationships with the middle East than with Europe. In the late 1940s, 66 Turkish Cypriot Australians migrated to Australia, marking the beginning of Turkish Cypriot migration in Australia.

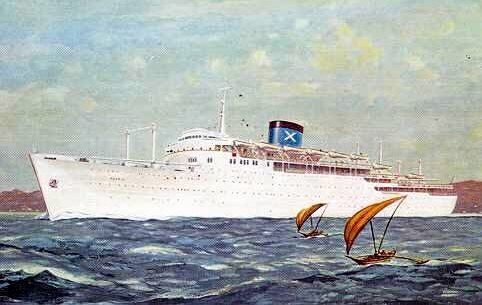
'RHMS Patris'Operational from the 1940s to 1980s, the migrant ship was responsible for transporting 70% of Cypriot migrants to Australia through Port Melbourne and Sydney Cove

=== Post World War 2 mass migration: 1940s–1980s ===
By the late 1940s and early 1950s, the Australian government began to implement a range of legislation and regimes which aimed to promote migration from Europe following the war. The success of many of these schemes caused repeated influxes of Cypriots into Australia over the remainder of the 20th century. The success of these regimes saw the first considerable wave of mass immigration to Australia, as Cypriots began migrate in larger numbers in the 1950s. By 1956, there were 350 Turkish Cypriot and 2000 Greek Cypriot born individuals living in Australia. The two and a half decades following World War 2 saw gradual increases in migrant flows from Cyprus to Australia. The greatest numbers of Cypriot migrants occurred in the middle to late 1970s, following the 1974 Turkish Invasion of Cyprus, where 6600 individuals arrived in Australia in the four years following the conflict. 16% of the Cypriot Australian population migrated after 1985, and whilst migration in Australia was once substantial, the rate has slowly declined from 1990 to 2018.

=== Migration in the 21st century ===
Since the turn of the century, the migration rates from Cyprus to Australia have reduced. The current population of Cypriot born Australians has reduced to approximately 17000 individuals, with this number having exceeded 22,000 in 1990. Education levels and graduation rates as well as literacy and work skill development has improved within Cypriot Australians as time has progressed. The peak of migration from Cyprus to Australia 1970s was largely driven by the turmoil occurring in the nation. During the 21st century, the majority of those who migrate to Australia from Cyprus have been driven by education and work.

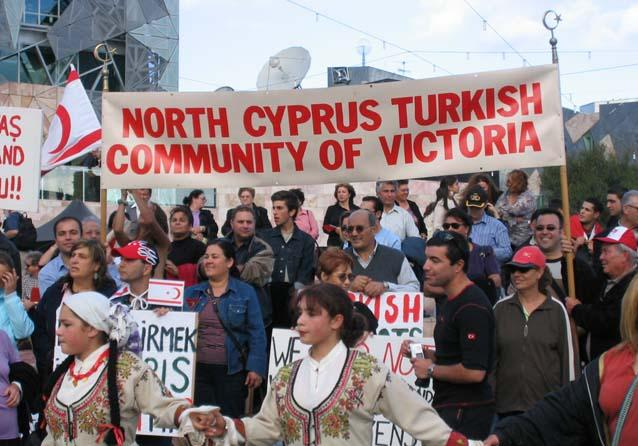
Turkish Cypriot community of Victoria.

== Culture ==
The culture of Cypriot Australians has been shaped by the ancient cultures of Greece and Turkey, as well as the Australian culture. Technology and transport in the 21st century have been able to integrate the Cypriot and Australian cultures. The amalgamation of beliefs between cultures in Australia has threatened Cypriot Australians with the loss of strongly held traditions of second and third generation Cypriot Australians. Second and third generation migrants have been decreasingly exposed to the traditions and cultures of Cyprus due to life away from their ancestral land as a result of migration.

The Cypriot Australian population has maintained extremely close links with the cultures and beliefs of their 'home' country. Since moving to Australia, the population has faced many threats of cultural loss and disengagement of Cypriot traditions as a result of their migration to Australia. The mass movement of Greek Cypriot and Turkish Cypriots into Australia following World War 2 during the implementation of the 'White Australia Policy' threatened many migrants with the loss of their cultural customs and traditions. The range of policies which were enforced for the majority of the twentieth century created a large barrier for migrants practicing their religious and cultural beliefs. Until the complete abolition of the policy in 1973, assimilation programs were set up for migrants with the aim to create a uni-cultural Australia. These assimilation programs, which focused primarily on 'educating' children to understand and accept the Australian culture, disadvantaged non English speaking individuals including Cypriot Australians.

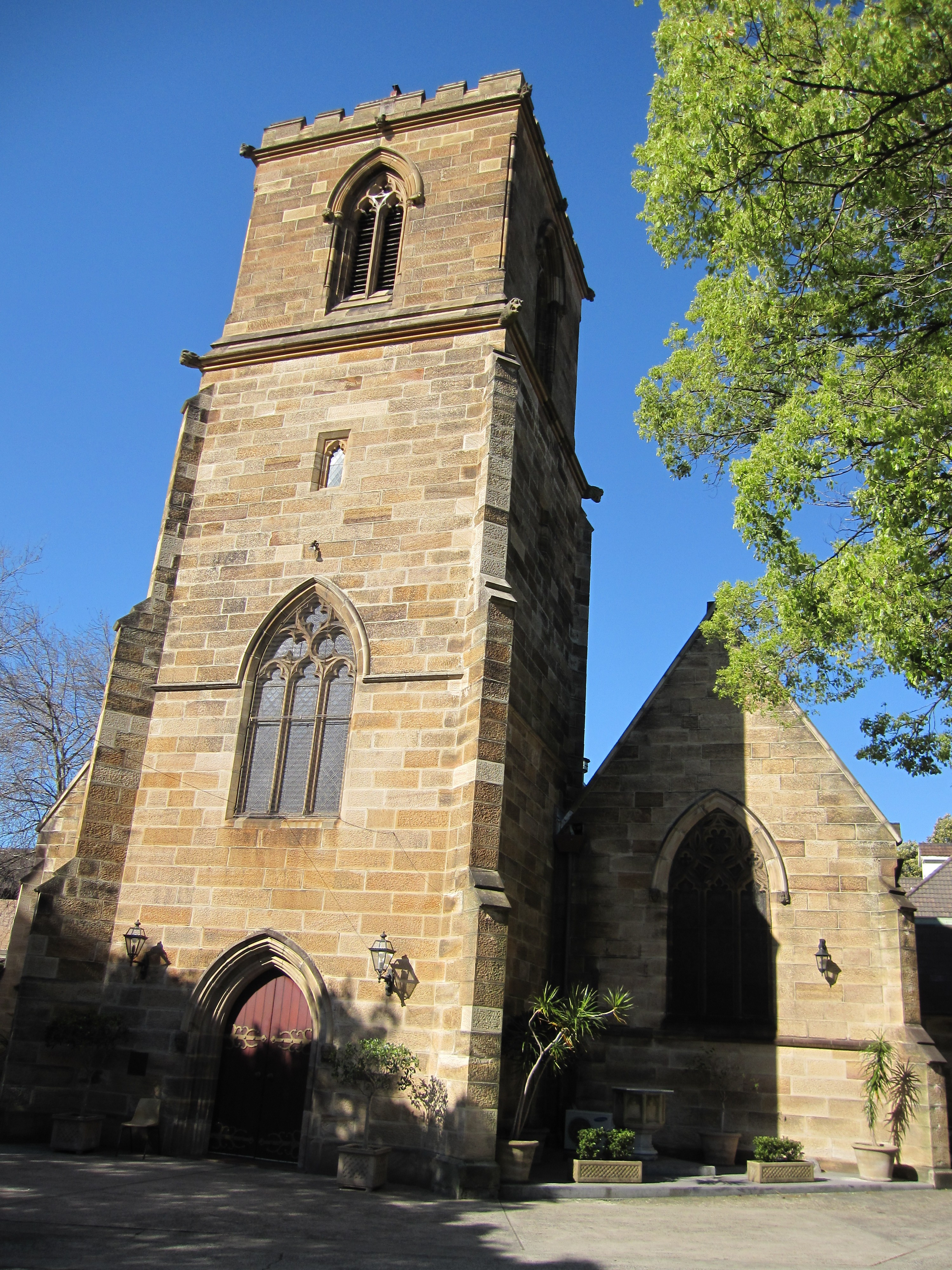
Greek Orthodox Archdiocese of Australia. Located in Surry Hills, Sydney

The abolition of such policies has encouraged cultural diversity and freedom within Australia. With Cypriot Australians being restricted in practicing their culture for much of the 20th century, Cypriot Australians of the 21st Century are able to maintain many of the customs and traditions of their ancestral land.

=== Religion ===
Religion is central to the lives of Greek Cypriot and Turkish Cypriot Australians. Religious events such as Easter (for Christian individuals) and Ramadan (for Muslim individuals) traditionally require 40 days and 30 days of fasting prior to the event. According to the 2016 census, over 67% of Cypriot Australians identified as Eastern Orthodox Christians, representing 11500 Australians. Another 15% of Cypriot born Australians identified as Islamic individuals, representing 2000 Australians. Cypriot Australians are generally relaxed in their religious practices when compared to neighboring countries such as Turkey and Lebanon.

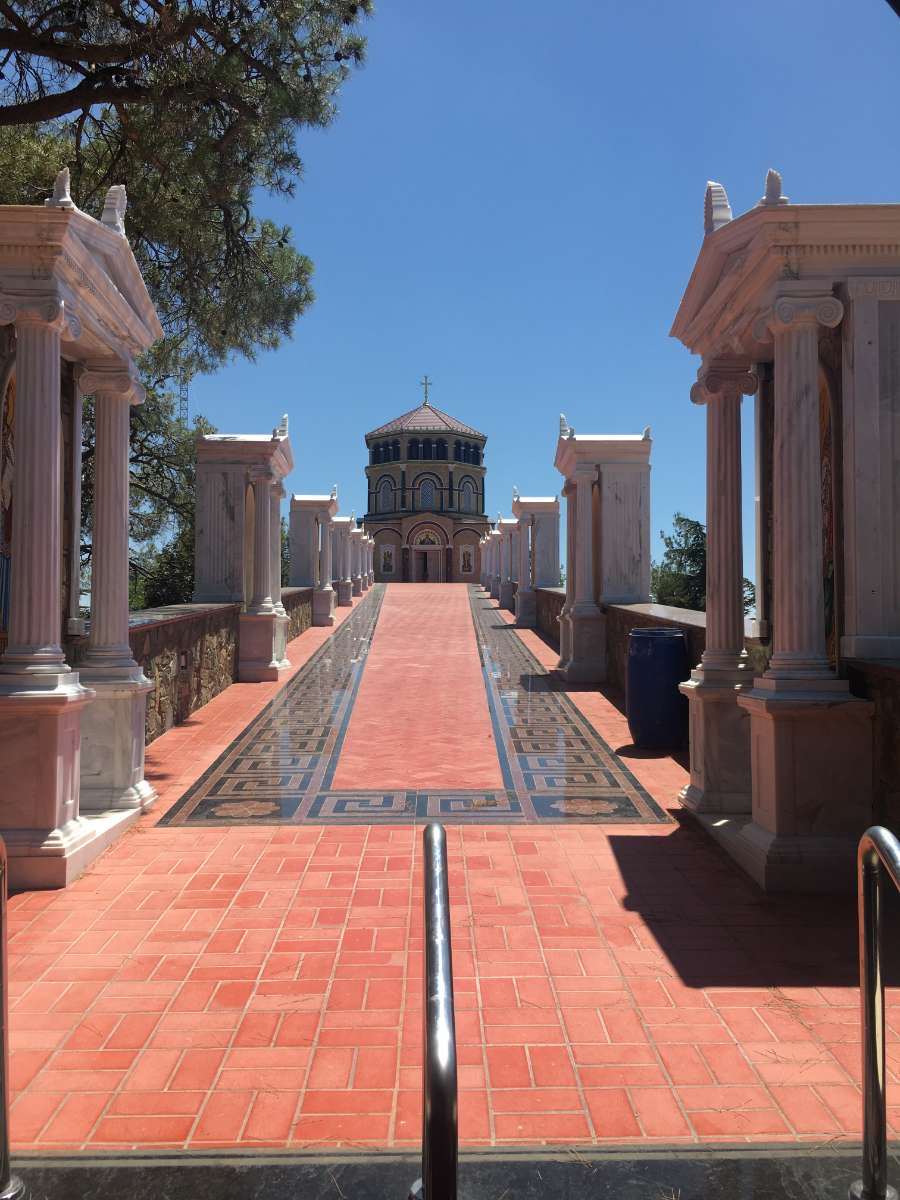
Kykkos Monastery. Located in Western Cyprus. It is the most recognised and popular monastery for Orthodox Cypriots.

In Australia, religion has been maintained more strongly in Cypriot Australians than other Australians, with 8.7% of the Cypriot born population of Australia claiming to have "no religion" according to the 2016 census, compared to the 30% atheist population of non-immigrant Australians.

=== Language ===
The main languages spoken by Cypriot Australians are Greek, which is spoken by 63% of the Cypriot born population, followed by Turkish at 17.5% and English at 16.6%. According to the 2016 census, of all Cypriots who claimed their first language to be either Greek or Turkish, 77% stated that they were proficient English speakers. The Greek Cypriot language displays a significantly different dialect to that of the traditional Greek language. Cypriot Greek has a relation to that of the ancient Greek language. Turkish Cypriots speak Turkish, a Turkic language. The traditional Turkish language shares no relationship with the Arabic language. With many Turkish people living in Arabic speaking countries such as Saudi Arabia, many phrases and words have been artificially included.

Cypriot Australians Languages
	Greek	Turkish	English
Spoken language	63% (~11,000)	17.5%(~2000)	16.6% (77% as second language)

Cypriot Australians Religions
Christianity (Eastern Orthodox)	Islam
67% (~11,500)	~15%

== Cypriots in Australia ==
Cypriot born Australians have lived in Australia since the middle of the 19th century. The cultural group's presence in Australia has been influenced by war and conflict, which has encouraged people of Cypriot descent to emigrate from Cyprus. The greatest population increase of Cypriots in Australia occurred as a result of the Turkish Invasion of Cyprus in 1974. World War 2 and the Turkish Invasion of Cyprus resulted in great socioeconomic and social impacts on those who chose to remain in Cyprus. As of the 2016 census, the Cypriot born population of Australia was 16,929, which has increased from 1000 individuals in 1940. The total population of Australians with Cypriot heritage as of 2014 exceeds 80,000 individuals. 80% (64000 individuals) of the Cypriot Australian population is made up of second and third generation Cypriot Australians.

=== Population movement: Cyprus to Australia ===
The first attempts by the Australian government to promote Cypriot Australian migration occurred in the 1950s, over one century after the first wave of Cypriot Australian migration occurred in Victoria. The efforts made to attract Cypriot Australian migration by the Menzies government caused Australia to become the second most common migrant destination for Cypriot individuals, surpassing the United Kingdom by the early 1960s. The largest movement of Cypriots into Australia occurred immediately after the 1974 Turkish Invasion of Cyprus. As a result of the military invasion, 6600 Cypriot individuals migrated to Australia from 1974 to 1978. In the 5 years following the invasion of 1974, the population of Cypriot born individuals living in Australia doubled. Of the 6600 Cypriot migrants, 3000 moved to Victoria, with the majority of Cypriot Victorians initially residing in Oakleigh and Brimbank on the outskirts of Melbourne. The Cypriot population of Australia peaked in 1991, with the Australian Census indicating a population of 22,030 Cypriot born individuals.

Since the beginning of the 1990s, the population of Cypriot born individuals has declined from 22,030 to approximately 16,929 as of the 2016 Census. The total population of Australian citizens with Cypriot heritage as of 2016 exceeds 80,000. Most of these individuals are second and third generation Cypriot Australians.

=== Demographics ===
==== Age and sex ====
Cypriot Australians are regarded as an ageing population, with 87% of the population being aged 45 and above. The median age of Cypriot born Australians including only first generation migrants as of 2016 is 60 years old, which is 23 years older than the median age of other Australians. The largest influx of Cypriot migrants occurring in the 1970s and the 1980s has raised the median age of the population. 1.8% of Cypriot born Australians are under 25 years of age.

Of the entire Cypriot born population of Australia, 48.7% are males, and 51.3% are females. The median fertility rate of Cypriot Australians is 2.2 children per woman. The same rate for total Australians Australians is 1.7 births per woman as of 2019. The median age of Australians with Cypriot heritage including second and third generation migrants is 38.

==== Occupation and location ====
The largest population of Cypriot born Australians exists in Victoria, which is home to 44.7% of the Cypriot Australian population. Most Cypriot Victorians reside in Melbourne. 37% of the Cypriot Australian population reside in NSW. 75% of this population is found in Sydney. Australian states other than New South Wales and Victoria are home to less than 20% of the Cypriot born population of Australia. Tasmania is home to the smallest Cypriot born population, with 62 individuals.

The first Cypriot Australian migrants predominantly engaged in manual labour, with this trend lasting from the cultural group's initial migration in the 1850s up until the end of the 20th century. Since the beginning of the 21st century, the most common occupations of Cypriot Australians have shifted to professional positions, comprising 40% of the job market. The technology and trade industry provides jobs for approximately 30% of the Cypriot Australian population.

==== Education ====
Throughout the 20th Century, the proportion of Cypriot Australians undertaking tertiary education was less than 10%. For non migrant Australians, this rate was twice as high. Job opportunities for migrant communities such as Cypriot Australians were restricted to labour and trades for much of the 1800s and 1900s. As of 2019, the proportion of Cypriot Australians obtaining university degrees is approximately 28%, with the figure being identical to that of non migrant Australians. The opportunity for Cypriot Australians to engage in quality education and employment in the 21st Century is equivalent to that of non migrants. The secondary education graduation rate for Cypriot Australians and other Australians is approximately 85%.

== Recognition of Cypriots in Australia ==
Cypriot Australians have not always been accepted in the Australian society. For much of the 1900s, government policies and the attitudes of Australians to non English migrants made it difficult for the minority group to gain recognition in the community. Since the end of the 20th century, Australia's government policies and community attitudes have become more multicultural.

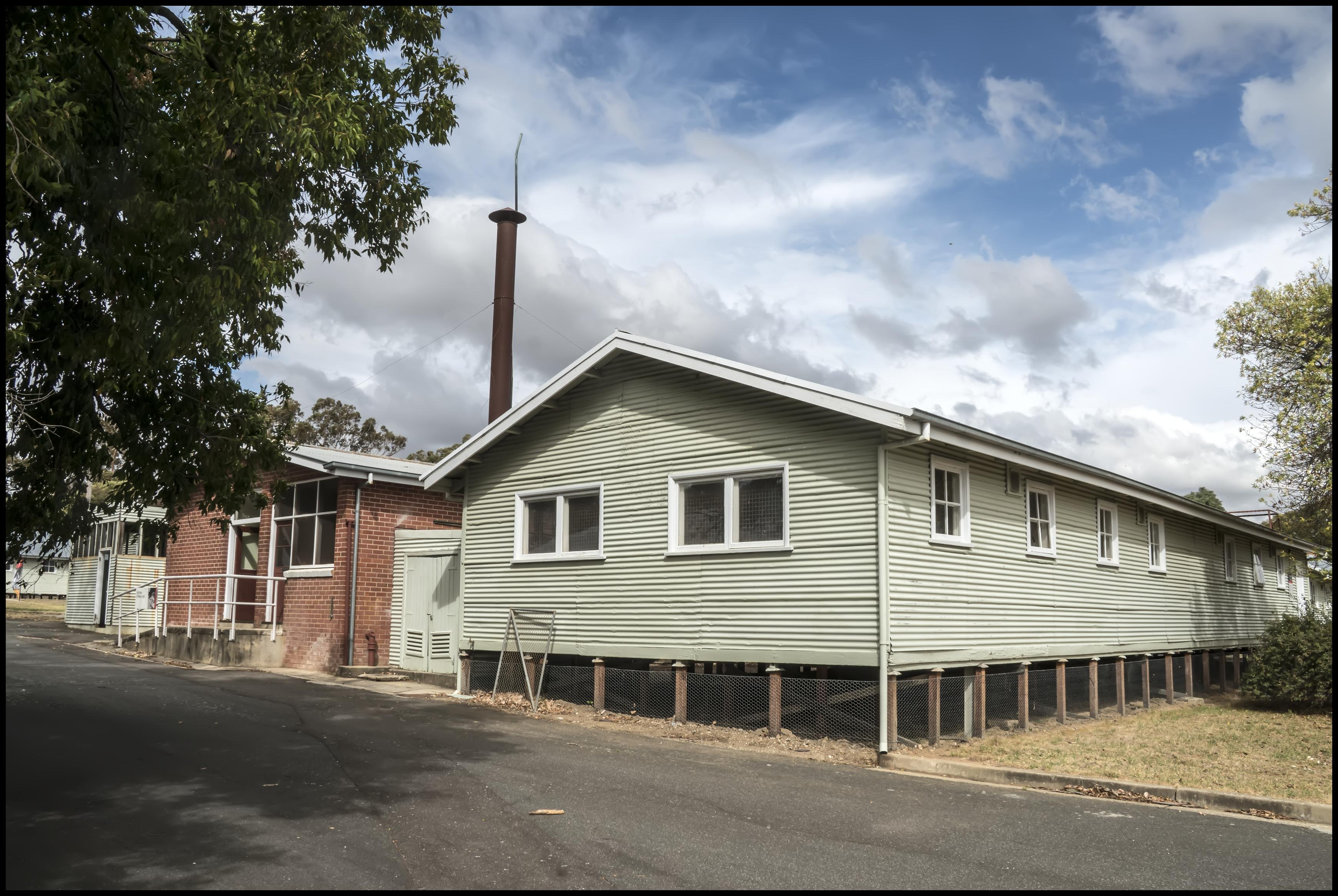
'Bonegilla' Migrant camp, Victoria. Housed Cypriot and other European migrants following World War 2.

=== 20th century: The White Australia Policy ===
The implementation of the White Australia Policy from 1901 to 1973 reduced Cypriot Australians' access to equal opportunity in education and the workforce. Such policies inhibited the opportunities for migrant children to engage in education and training programs, specifically those of Turkish Cypriot origin. Migrant children's education was focused on learning the English language rather than developing professional skills. Throughout the 20th century, many Cypriot Australians engaged in unskilled labour working on a minimum wage.

=== 21st century: A multicultural Australia ===
The introduction of new multicultural services and legislation throughout the 21st century has reduced inequalities between migrant and non migrant education and employment levels. At the time of the 2016 census, 40% of Cypriot born Australians above 15 years of age were studying or had a qualification, compared to the 60% seen in the total Australian population. The unemployment rate in Cypriot Australians at 4.8% is 2% lower than that of other Australians. The multilingual news offered by the Special Broadcasting Service (SBS) has assisted migrants to be aware of currents affairs as more active members of society.

=== Continuing recognition ===
The Turkish Cypriot population comprises 17% of the total Cypriot Australian community. Since the Turkish invasion of Cyprus in 1974, the Turkish Cypriot population has continued to fight for the recognition of the Turkish Republic of Northern Cyprus as a sovereign state. As of 2020, Turkey remains the only country which formally recognises the Turkish Republic of Northern Cyprus as a sovereign state. The Australian government acknowledges this land as Cypriot land.

== Notable Cypriot Australians ==
=== Sportspeople ===
- Jack Aziz, Australian rules football player
- Aziz Behich, footballer, Australian Soccer National Team
- Andrew Demetriou, VFL player, CEO of the AFL
- Jim Demetriou, AFL player
- Stephanie Kyriacou, professional golfer
- Lydia Lassila
- Anthony Koutoufides, Father was born in Egypt to Greek Cypriot parents
- Levent Osman, football player
- Ufuk Talay, football player
- Jimmy Toumpas, AFL player, Port Adelaide Football Club
- Michael Zullo
- Isaiah Iongi

=== Film and television ===
- Ada Nicodemou of Home and Away and Dancing with the Stars Australia. Born in Cyprus.
- Sinem Saban, film writer, producer, director, and human rights activist
- Ismail Tosun, celebrity chef

=== Music ===
- Peter Andre
- Sarah Ioannides
- Silia Kapsis
- Andrew Lambrou

=== Historians ===
- Andrekos Varnava - writer and professor of history at Flinders University

=== Arts ===
- Mutlu Çerkez, conceptual artist
- Stelarc – performance artist

=== Politicians ===
- Steve Christou
- Michael Costa
- Hutch Hussein, State President of the Victorian branch of the Australian Labor Party (ALP) between 2016 and 2019
- Andrea Michaels
- Andrew Theophanous
- Theo Theophanous
- Nazlı Süleyman, member of the Labour party
- Kat Theophanous
- Nick Xenophon

=== Businesspeople and CEOs ===
- Bulent Hass Dellal – Director and Chairman of Special Broadcasting Service (SBS)
- George Savvides – CEO of Medibank Private Health Insurance.

== See also ==
- Australia–Cyprus relations
- British Australians
- Greek Australians
- Greek community of Melbourne
- Immigration to Australia
- Cypriot Americans
- British Cypriots
- Turkish Australians
