= 374th =

374th may refer to:

- 374th Airlift Wing, unit of the United States Air Force assigned to Fifth Air Force, stationed at Yokota Air Base, Japan
- 374th Fighter Squadron or 171st Air Refueling Squadron, unit of the Michigan Air National Guard's 127th Wing (127 WG) located at Selfridge Air National Guard Base, Michigan
- 374th Operations Group, the operational flying component of the United States Air Force 374th Airlift Wing
- 374th Strategic Missile Squadron, inactive United States Air Force unit, last assigned to the 308th Strategic Missile Wing, stationed at Little Rock AFB, Arkansas

== See also ==
- 374 (number)
- 374, the year 374 (CCCLXXIV) of the Julian calendar
- 374 BC
