= 374 BC =

374 BC in various calendars
- Gregorian calendar: 374 BC; CCCLXXIV BC
- Ab urbe condita: 380
- Ancient Egypt era: XXX dynasty, 7
- Pharaoh: Nectanebo I, 7
- Ancient Greek Olympiad (summer): 101st Olympiad, year 3
- Assyrian calendar: 4377
- Balinese saka calendar: N/A
- Bengali calendar: −967 – −966
- Berber calendar: 577
- Buddhist calendar: 171
- Burmese calendar: −1011
- Byzantine calendar: 5135–5136
- Chinese calendar: 丙午年 (Fire Horse); 2324 or 2117 — to — 丁未年 (Fire Goat); 2325 or 2118
- Coptic calendar: −657 – −656
- Discordian calendar: 793
- Ethiopian calendar: −381 – −380
- Hebrew calendar: 3387–3388
- Hindu calendars
- Vikram Samvat: −317 – −316
- Shaka Samvat: N/A
- Kali Yuga: 2727–2728
- Holocene calendar: 9627
- Iranian calendar: 995 BP – 994 BP
- Islamic calendar: 1026 BH – 1025 BH
- Javanese calendar: N/A
- Julian calendar: N/A
- Korean calendar: 1960
- Minguo calendar: 2285 before ROC 民前2285年
- Nanakshahi calendar: −1841
- Thai solar calendar: 169–170
- Tibetan calendar: མེ་ཕོ་རྟ་ལོ་ (male Fire-Horse) −247 or −628 or −1400 — to — མེ་མོ་ལུག་ལོ་ (female Fire-Sheep) −246 or −627 or −1399

Year 374 BC was a year of the pre-Julian Roman calendar. At the time, it was known as the Second year without Tribunate or Consulship (or, less frequently, year 380 Ab urbe condita). The denomination 374 BC for this year has been used since the early medieval period, when the Anno Domini calendar era became the prevalent method in Europe for naming years.

== Events ==
=== By place ===
==== Greece ====
- Athens tries to retire from the Theban-Spartan war and makes peace with Sparta. However, the peace is quickly broken.
- Sparta attacks Corcyra, enlisting Syracusan help. Athens comes to the island's aid. The Athenian general, Timotheus, captures Corcyra and defeats the Spartans at sea off Alyzia (Acarnania).

==== Cyprus ====
- The King of Salamis, Evagoras, is assassinated. He is succeeded by his son, Nicocles, who continues his father's liberal Hellenising policy in Cyprus, encouraged by Isocrates, who writes his Exhortation to Nicocles.

==== Persia ====
- Pharnabazus II, Satrap of Hellespontine Phrygia, ends his reign.

== Deaths ==
- Evagoras, king of Salamis in Cyprus (assassinated)
- Marquess Ai of Han
