= Cyprus–Greece relations =

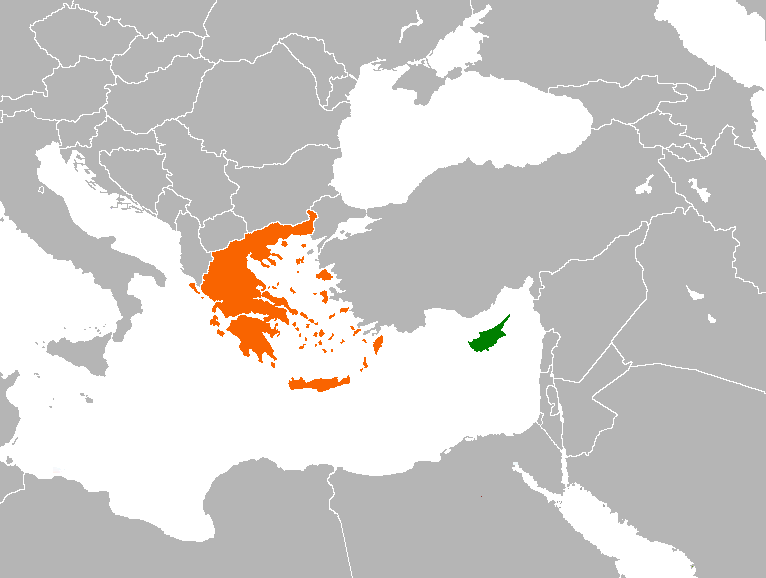
- Cyprus: Greece

Diplomatic mission
- Embassy of Cyprus, Athens: Embassy of Greece, Nicosia

Cyprus–Greece relations are the bilateral and historic relations between the Republic of Cyprus and the Hellenic Republic. Cyprus has an embassy in Athens and a consulate-general in Thessaloniki. Greece has an embassy in Nicosia. Both countries are full members of the United Nations, European Union, Council of Europe and the Organization for Security and Co-operation in Europe (OSCE). Relations between the two countries have been exceptionally close since the Republic of Cyprus was formed in 1960. The Greek populations in Cyprus and Greece share a common ethnicity, heritage, language, and religion. Greece has given full support to Cyprus' membership in the European Union.

== History ==
In July 1974, the Greek military junta supported a coup by the Cypriot National Guard as part of efforts to achieve unification between Greece and Cyprus. This was followed shortly thereafter by the Turkish invasion of Cyprus, resulting in the current division of the island.

== Economic relations ==
Traditionally, Greece has been the major export and import partner of Cyprus. In 2019, Greece produced $257,165.64 US Dollars in exports $1,855,624.30 US Dollars in imports for Cyprus, being Cyprus's first ranking import partner.

== Similarity of Anthems ==
Greece and Cyprus have the same anthem. Greece adopted the anthem in 1865, while Cyprus adopted it in 1966.

== European Union ==
Greece joined the EU in 1981. Cyprus joined the EU in 2004.

== NATO ==
While Greece became a member of NATO in 1952, Cyprus has never been a member of NATO.

== Resident diplomatic missions ==
- Cyprus has an embassy in Athens and a consulate-general in Thessaloniki.
- Greece has an embassy in Nicosia.
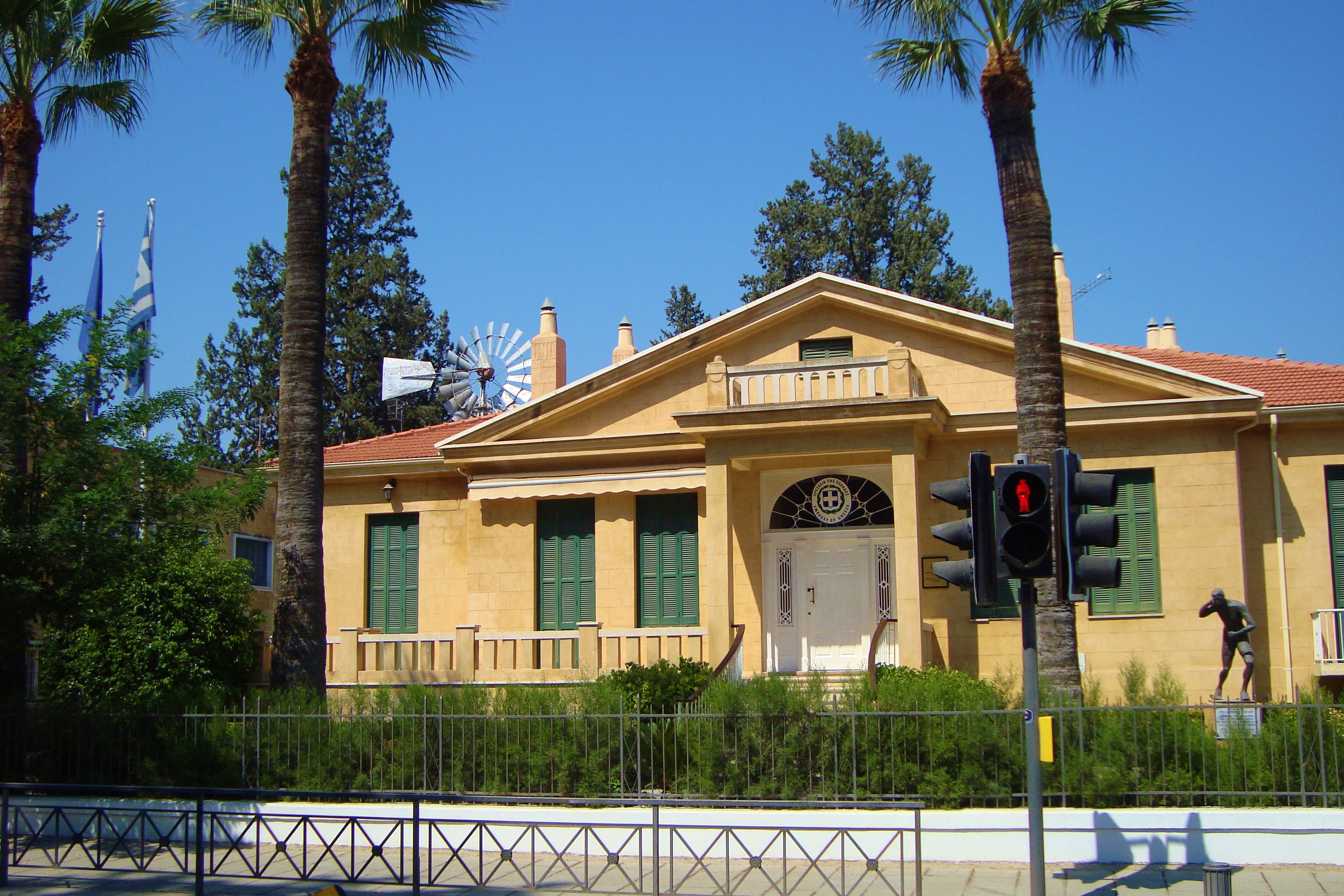
Embassy of Greece in Nicosia

== See also ==
- Foreign relations of Cyprus
- Foreign relations of Greece
- Energy Triangle
- Greek Cypriots
- Cypriot Greek
- Enosis
- Cyprus in the European Union
- Cyprus–NATO relations
