= Nicocles politus =

Scientific classification
- Domain: Eukaryota
- Kingdom: Animalia
- Phylum: Arthropoda
- Class: Insecta
- Order: Diptera
- Family: Asilidae
- Genus: Nicocles
- Species: N. politus

Binomial name
- Nicocles politus (Say, 1823)

Synonyms
- Dasypogon politus Say, 1823; Pygostolus argentifer Loew, 1866

Species of fly

Nicocles politus is a species of robber flies (insects in the family Asilidae).
