= Nicocles aemulator =

Scientific classification
- Domain: Eukaryota
- Kingdom: Animalia
- Phylum: Arthropoda
- Class: Insecta
- Order: Diptera
- Family: Asilidae
- Genus: Nicocles
- Species: N. aemulator

Binomial name
- Nicocles aemulator (Loew, 1872)

Synonyms
- Pygostolus aemulator Loew, 1872

Species of fly

Nicocles aemulator is a species of robber flies (insects in the family Asilidae).
