= Evagoras II =

4th-century BC King of Salamis and Persian Satrap

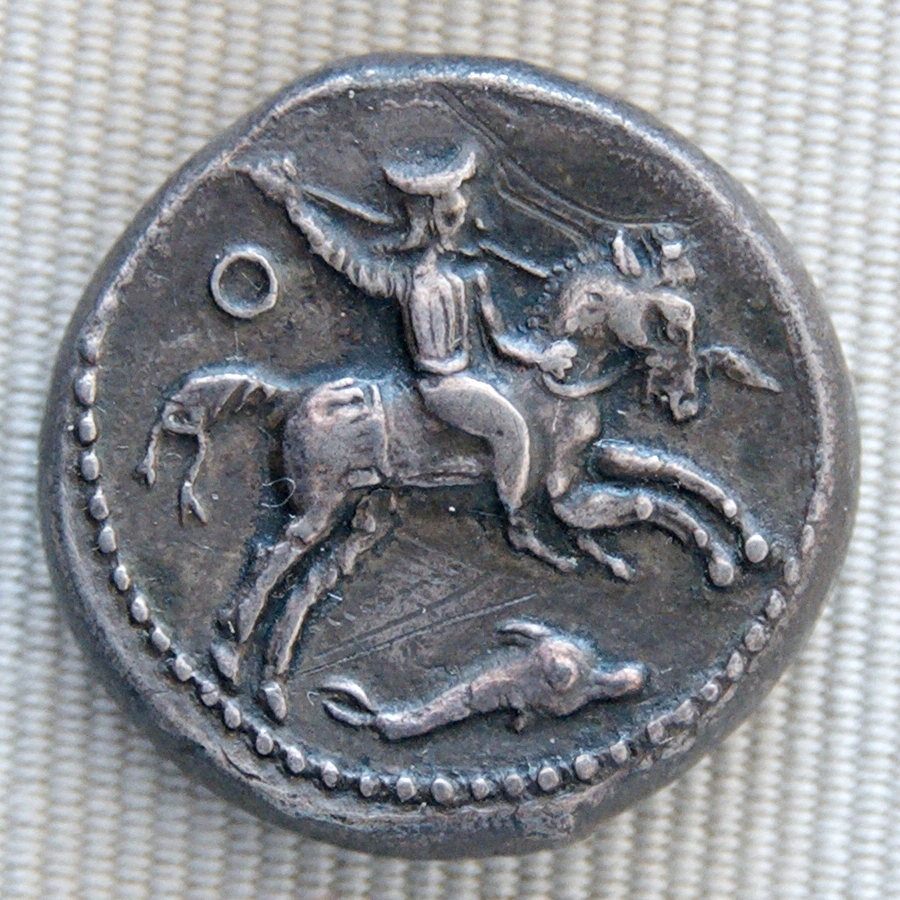
Silver tetradrachm of Evagoras II (Cabinet des Médailles, Paris)

Evagoras II or Euagoras II (Greek: Εὐαγόρας) was a king of the Ancient Greek city-state of Salamis in Cyprus, and later satrap for Achaemenid Persia in Phoenicia.

He was possibly a son of his predecessor, Nicocles, and a grandson of Evagoras I. He followed a pro-Persian course, for which he was deposed c. 351 BC by a popular revolt led by his nephew Pnytagoras, who succeeded him as king.

Evagoras fled to the Persian court, where Artaxerxes III gave him the government of the Phoenician city of Sidon, following the defeat of the rebellion of Tennes. His administration of Sidon was so bad that after three years, in 346 BC, he was chased out of the city by the populace, who called upon a descendant of the ancient royal line, Abdashtart II, to replace him. Evagoras fled back to Cyprus, where he was arrested and executed.

Preceded by Nicocles	King of Salamis; 361–351 BC	Succeeded by Pnytagoras
