= Abdemon =

5th-century BC Phoenician king of Cyprus

Abdemon (Ancient Greek: Αὐδήμων, gen.: Αὐδήμονος), was the king of Salamis on Cyprus towards the end of the 5th century BC. He was of Phoenician origin and was born either in Tyre or Kition. Around 415 BC, Abdemon deposed the Phoenician ruler of Salamis. Evagoras, who allegedly came from a Greek dynasty (that of Teucer), had to leave the city and went into exile in Soli. However, Evagoras returned in 411 BC with his followers and deposed Abdemon. Some coins of Abdemon have been found.

== Notes ==
Unknown	King of Salamis c. 415 BC – 411 BC	Succeeded by Evagoras I
