= Nicocles pictus =

Scientific classification
- Domain: Eukaryota
- Kingdom: Animalia
- Phylum: Arthropoda
- Class: Insecta
- Order: Diptera
- Family: Asilidae
- Genus: Nicocles
- Species: N. pictus

Binomial name
- Nicocles pictus (Loew, 1866)

Synonyms
- Dasypogon amastris Walker, 1849; Pygostolus pictus Loew, 1866

Species of fly

Nicocles pictus is a species of robber flies (insects in the family Asilidae).
