= Greek Cypriot diaspora =

Populations of Greek Cypriots

The Greek-Cypriot diaspora refers to the Greek Cypriot population of Cyprus, or people who are of Greek Cypriot origins, who live abroad because of either economic reasons, or were part of the Greek population that was uprooted from their homes in Northern Cyprus by the Turkish Invasion of Cyprus when the island was divided, into the Greek-Cypriot controlled southern two-thirds and the Turkish-controlled northern one-third in 1974.

Many Greek Cypriots migrated to the UK in the 1950s and 1960s for economic reasons, but many also fled, leaving their island country behind after the Turkish invasion of 1974. Today, the majority of Greek Cypriots living abroad are in the United Kingdom, particularly in North London, many around the Southgate neighbourhood. However, thousands more have also relocated to Australia, Canada, South Africa, the United States and other European countries. Many often return to Cyprus and are a major force in advocating Cypriot issues around the world.

== See also ==
- British Cypriots
- Notable British Cypriots
- Cypriot Americans
- Cypriot Australians
