= Bulent Hass Dellal =

Australian businesspeople

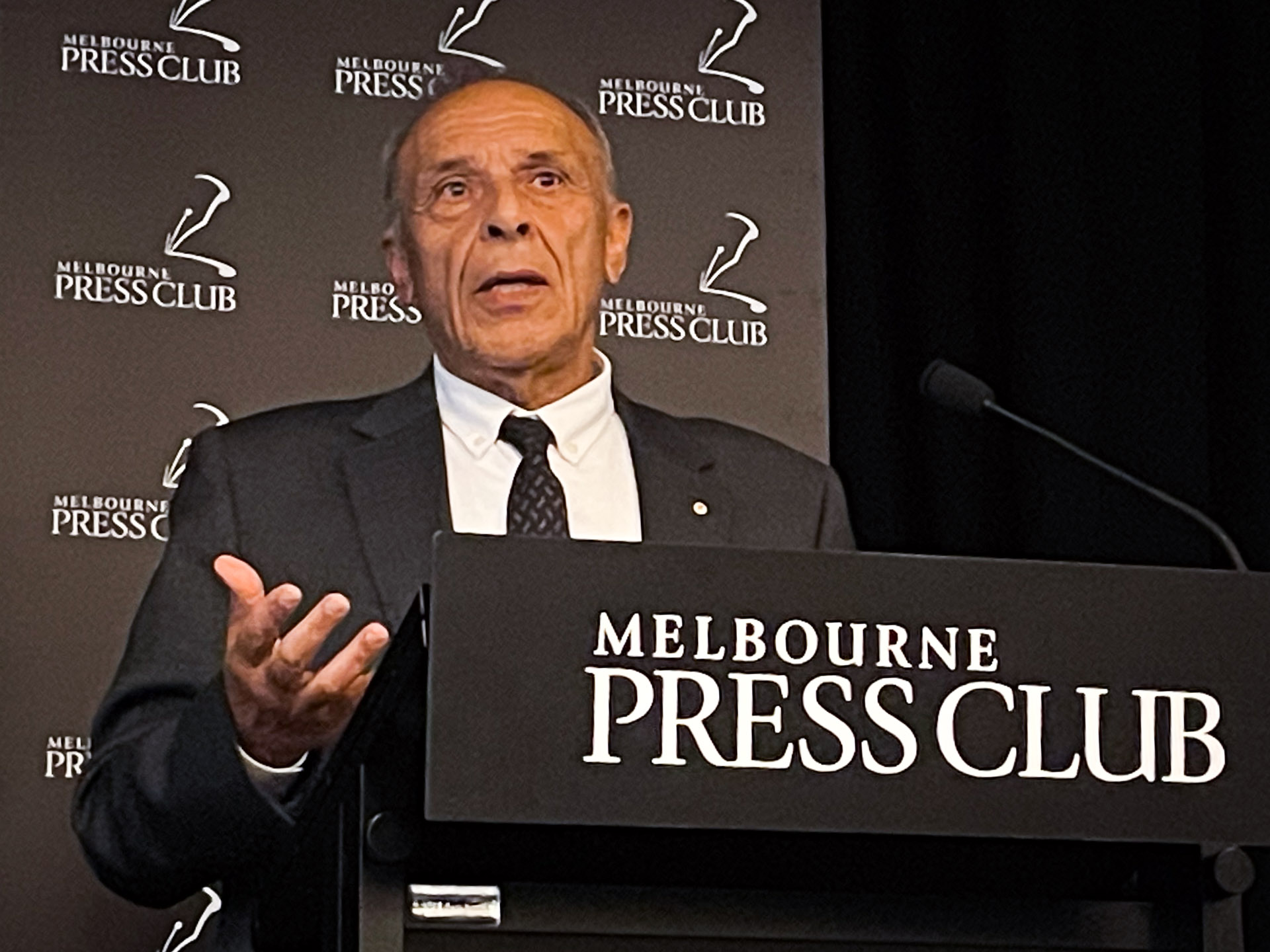
- Dellal speaks at a Melbourne Press Club Multicultural Media panel in March 2024.
- Born: Melbourne, Australia

Bülent Hass Dellal AO was a director and chairman of the Special Broadcasting Service (SBS) in Australia before stepping down on 2 June 2020.

== Life and career ==
Dellal was born in Melbourne, Australia, to Turkish Cypriot parents, and is the eldest of three children. His great-grandfather was the last Ottoman mufti of Cyprus. Dellal's early childhood was spent in Glenroy, where he attended primary school. Dellal spent his after-school hours and weekends helping his father, Hasan, with the general store they owned in Glenroy. His father devoted his spare time towards assisting Turkish Cypriot immigrants who settled in Australia and helped form the Cyprus Turkish Association. He also founded the Cyprus Turkish Islamic Society, and was responsible for managing the construction of the Sunshine Mosque. Although Turkish culture was a strong presence within his household, Dellal and his siblings found it difficult to speak the language, preferring instead to speak in English. His father decided to move the family to Turkey, so that the children would gain a stronger sense of their culture. In 1962, at the age of 10, Dellal's family sold their assets and moved to Ankara, Turkey but returned to Australia in 1965, where he spent his secondary school years. Dellal studied at Merrilands Secondary College and then at the Melba Conservatory in Richmond. Once he finished his studies, he became a teacher at a Catholic girls' college. In 1989, Dellal became the founding executive of the Australian Multicultural Foundation (AMF). His efforts were recognised in 1997 when he was awarded the Medal of the Order of Australia by Queen Elizabeth II for his support of multicultural affairs, the arts and the community. In 2003 he was awarded the Centenary of Federation Medal for his contribution to Australian society.

== Awards ==
- 1997: Medal of the Order of Australia
- 2003: Centenary of Federation Medal

== Bibliography ==
- Gobbo, Sir James (2010), Something to Declare: A Memoir, The Miegunyah Press, ISBN 978-0522857313.
- Hüssein, Serkan (2007), Yesterday & Today: Turkish Cypriots of Australia, Serkan Hüssein, ISBN 978-0-646-47783-1.

Media offices
Preceded by Nihal Gupta	Chairman of the Special Broadcasting Service; 2017–2020	Succeeded by George Savvides
