= George Savvides =

Australian businessman

George Savvides AM
- Born: 20 October 1956 (age 70); Australia
- Education: University of New South Wales, University of Technology, Sydney
- Occupation: Businessman
- Known for: Former Managing Director of private health insurance company Medibank Private
- Spouse: Vivian Savvides (m. 1979)
- Children: 2

George Savvides AM (born 20 October 1956) is an Australian businessman. He was chairman of the Special Broadcasting Service (SBS) before stepping down in July 2025. Between 2002 and 2016 he was the Managing Director of private health insurance company Medibank Private.

== Education ==
Savvides is the son of Greek Cypriot parents who arrived in Australia in 1950. He was the first person in his family to go to university. He trained as an industrial engineer and has a Bachelor of Engineering (Honours) from the University of New South Wales. While working full-time he obtained a Master in Business Administration from the University of Technology, Sydney, which included a final year thesis on the Japanese TQM & Lean manufacturing process.

== Career ==
In 1992, Savvides was CEO at Smith & Nephew (a UK-based global healthcare company), and BOC. In 1996, he led Sigma Pharmaceuticals, then a private cooperative supplying pharmacists, through six major acquisitions and then in late 1999 into public ownership and listing on the Australian Securities Exchange. After a short stint as Managing Director of Healthpoint Technologies in 2002 he was appointed to the board of Medibank Private as a non-executive director on 6 September 2001 and was appointed Managing Director on 19 April 2002. He joined the organisation at a time when it was making a significant loss ($175 million for 2001-02), but by 2004-05 had turned that around to a record profit ($130.8 million).

Savvides was a Councillor of the Australian Health Insurance Association (AHIA) and the International Federation of Health Plans, and Director of the Australian Centre for Health Research (ACHR). He was also a Director of World Vision Australia (board member 1998 to 2011) and World Vision International (board member between 2001 and 2011). He chaired the Stewardship Committee (Finance Committee) and was a member of the World Vision International Executive Committee. He is a Fellow of the Australian Institute of Company Directors.

On 21 October 2015 Savvides announced his retirement from Medibank, which took effect at the end of March 2016.

He was appointed to the Special Broadcasting Service (SBS) Board as Deputy Chair in March 2017. On 9 July 2020 it was announced that he had been appointed as Chair for a period of five years. In September 2024, Savvides announced that he would not seek re-appointment as SBS Chair at the expiration of his second term in July 2025.

== Personal ==
Savvides married in November 1979. He and his wife Vivian have sponsored, starting when they married, many children through World Vision. They are committed Christians and are involved in the NewPeninsula Baptist Church where he chairs the Board. His philosophy is that "the expression of our faith was never meant to be divorced from the world of work". He refers to the workplace as "the vineyard we have been called to work in where faith and work are not separated".

He enjoys fast boats and has played hockey since his childhood. He played for the Melbourne University Hockey Club Blues Veterans team until 2016.

Savvides was made a Member of the Order of Australia in the 2020 Australia Day Honours for "significant service to the community, to charitable groups, and to business."

Media offices
| Preceded by Bulent Hass Dellal | Chairman of the Special Broadcasting Service; 2020–present | Incumbent |
