= Nicocles utahensis =

Scientific classification
- Domain: Eukaryota
- Kingdom: Animalia
- Phylum: Arthropoda
- Class: Insecta
- Order: Diptera
- Family: Asilidae
- Genus: Nicocles
- Species: N. utahensis

Binomial name
- Nicocles utahensis Banks, 1920

Synonyms
- Nicocles punctipennis Melander, 1924

Species of fly

Nicocles utahensis is a species of robber flies in the family Asilidae.
