= Nicocles rufus =

Scientific classification
- Domain: Eukaryota
- Kingdom: Animalia
- Phylum: Arthropoda
- Class: Insecta
- Order: Diptera
- Family: Asilidae
- Genus: Nicocles
- Species: N. rufus

Binomial name
- Nicocles rufus Williston, 1883

Species of fly

Nicocles rufus is a species of robber flies (insects in the family Asilidae).
