= Ioannis Kigalas =

Greek Cypriot scholar

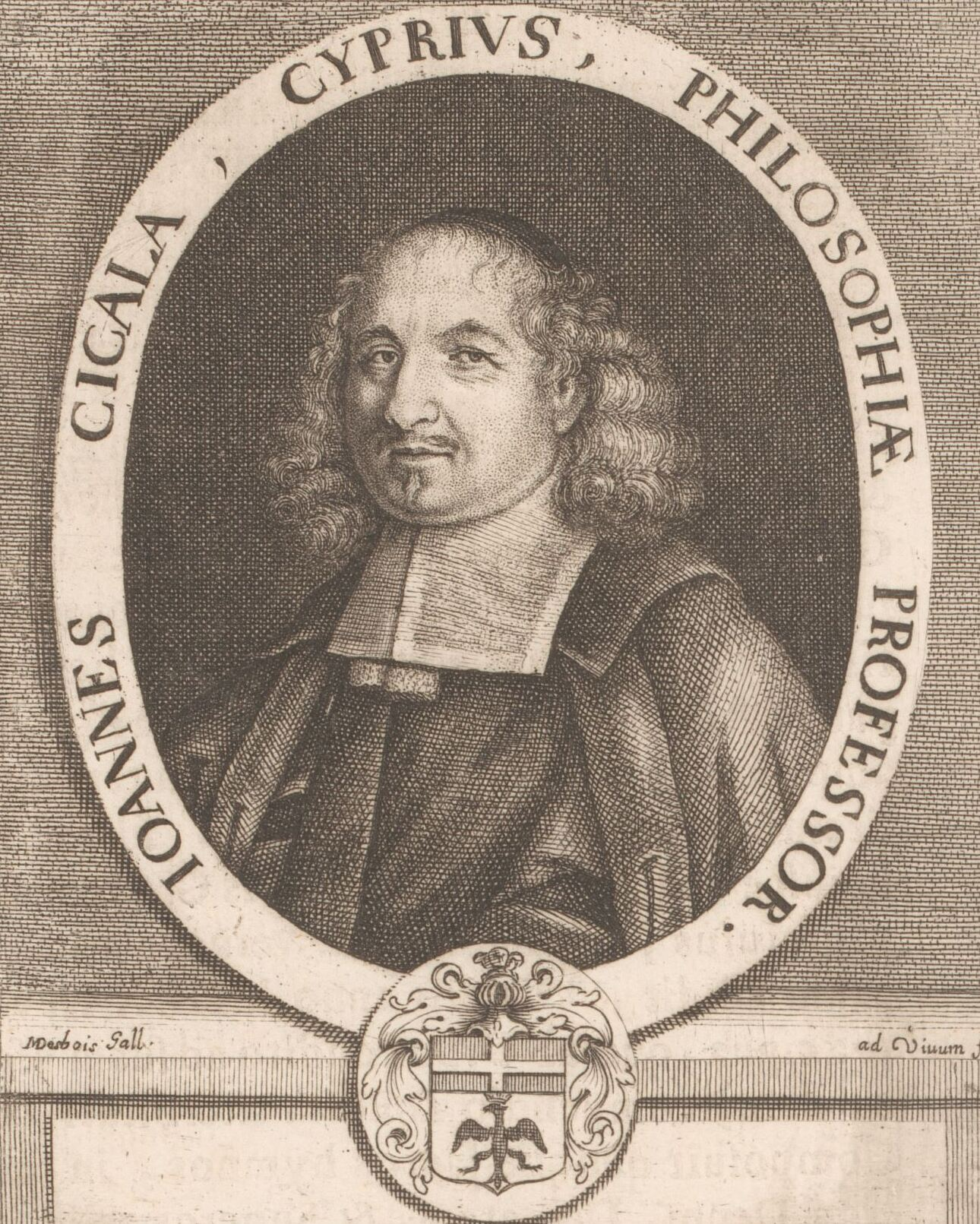
- A portrait of Ioannis Kigalas.
- Born: Ιωάννης Κιγάλας c. 1622; Nicosia, Ottoman Cyprus
- Died: 5 November 1687; Padua, Republic of Venice
- Occupations: Philosopher, physician, lawyer
- Writing career
- Movement: Italian Renaissance

Ioannis Kigalas (Greek: Ιωάννης Κιγάλας; Italian: Giovanni Cigala, Cicala; Latin: Joannes Cigala; c. 1622 – 5 November 1687) was a Greek Cypriot scholar and professor of philosophy and logic who was largely active in Padua and Venice in the 17th-century Italian Renaissance.

== Biography ==
Ioannis Kigalas was a Greek born in 1622 in the city of Nicosia on the island of Cyprus, then constituting a province in the Ottoman Empire. His father was Matthaios. Ioannis moved to Italy in his youth to pursue his education. From 1635 he was enrolled in the college of Saint Athanasios in Rome, where he was soon joined by his brothers Dimtrios and Ieronymos who studied at the same college. In 1642 he graduated as Doctor of Philosophy and Doctor of Theology and was employed as a teacher of the Greek language from 1642 to 1650. Kigalas soon moved to Venice where he briefly practiced law. He later moved to Padua, where in 1666 he was appointed professor of philosophy and logic at the University of Padua. He was selected as professor to the second chair of philosophy in 1678, and by 1687 he was appointed professor to the first chair of philosophy. He wrote several epigrams in Greek. Several of his works have survived in books of other scholars. Kigalas died on 5 November 1687.

== See also ==
- Greek scholars in the Renaissance
