= Merrilands College =

Coordinates: 37°41′52″S 145°00′16″E

- Reservoir, Melbourne, Victoria, Australia

Information
- Type: Public school
- Established: 1997
- School district: Northern Metropolitan Region Schools
- Principal: Wayne Hill
- Grades: P–12
- Enrolment: 355
- Website: merrilandscollege-p12.vic.edu.au

Merrilands College was a public P–12 school in Reservoir, Melbourne, Victoria, Australia now merged with Lakeside Secondary College (Radford Road Campus) to become William Ruthven Secondary College, as the Merrilands Road Campus.

Merrilands is divided into three "sub-schools". The first comprises Preparatory to Year Four, the second Year Five to Year Nine, and the third Year Ten to Year Twelve.

The principal of Merrilands College is Wayne Hill. The school was founded in 1997 through the merge of Merrilands Secondary College and Merrilands Primary School. As of 2008, it has 355 pupils.

== 2010 merger ==
In 2010, Lakeside Secondary College and Ruthven Primary School will be merged into Merrilands College.

The William Ruthven Primary campuses will be located at Glasgow Avenue and Merrilands Road, and the Secondary, Lakeside Campus and the Merrilands Campus at Merrilands Road, Reservoir, Melbourne, Australia. In the near future, a brand new school is planned to be built on the Merrilands site, where all three campuses will combine to form one whole campus as William Ruthven Education Precinct.

The Victorian Department of Education has made the following decisions:

- The mergers of the three current schools into the two new schools will come into place on 1 January 2010.
- The schools will remain on the current sites in 2010 as campuses of the new schools.
- There will be two interim school councils in place on that date – a council for the primary school and a council for the secondary school. The members will be drawn from the existing councils while others will be nominated.
- The interim councils will be responsible for all the major tasks required to establish the two new schools.
- From 1 January 2010 the current school councils will become campus committees and manage local issues for the first part of the year.

== Construction site controversy ==
The decision made in 2010 to move Radford Road campus students to the Merrilands Road Campus before and during construction has caused three school council members to resign. It has also caused a public debate into the educational, health and safety risks of having students attend the Merrilands construction site.
