= Syennesis of Cyprus =

Syennesis (Ancient Greek: Συέννεσις) of Cyprus was a physician, who must have lived in or before the fourth century BCE, as he is mentioned by Aristotle, who quotes from his writings a passage on the origin of the veins. This fragment also forms part of the treatise De Ossium Natura in the Hippocratic Corpus, which is in fact composed entirely of passages taken from different ancient writers.
