= Acesas =

Ancient Greek weaver

Acesas (Greek: Ἀκεσᾶς) was a native of Salamis in Cyprus famed for his skill in weaving cloth with variegated patterns (polymitarius).

Acesas and his son Helicon, who distinguished himself in the same art, are mentioned by Athenaeus. Zenobius speaks of both artists, but says that Acesas (or, as he calls him, Aceseus, Ακεσεύς) was a native of Patara, and Helicon of Carystus. He tells us also that they were the first who made a peplos for Athena Polias.

While the exact time of their lives is unknown, it must have been before the time of Euripides and Plato, who mention the peplos they made. A specimen of the workmanship of these two artists was preserved in the temple at Delphi, bearing an inscription to the effect that Pallas had imparted marvelous skill to their hands.
