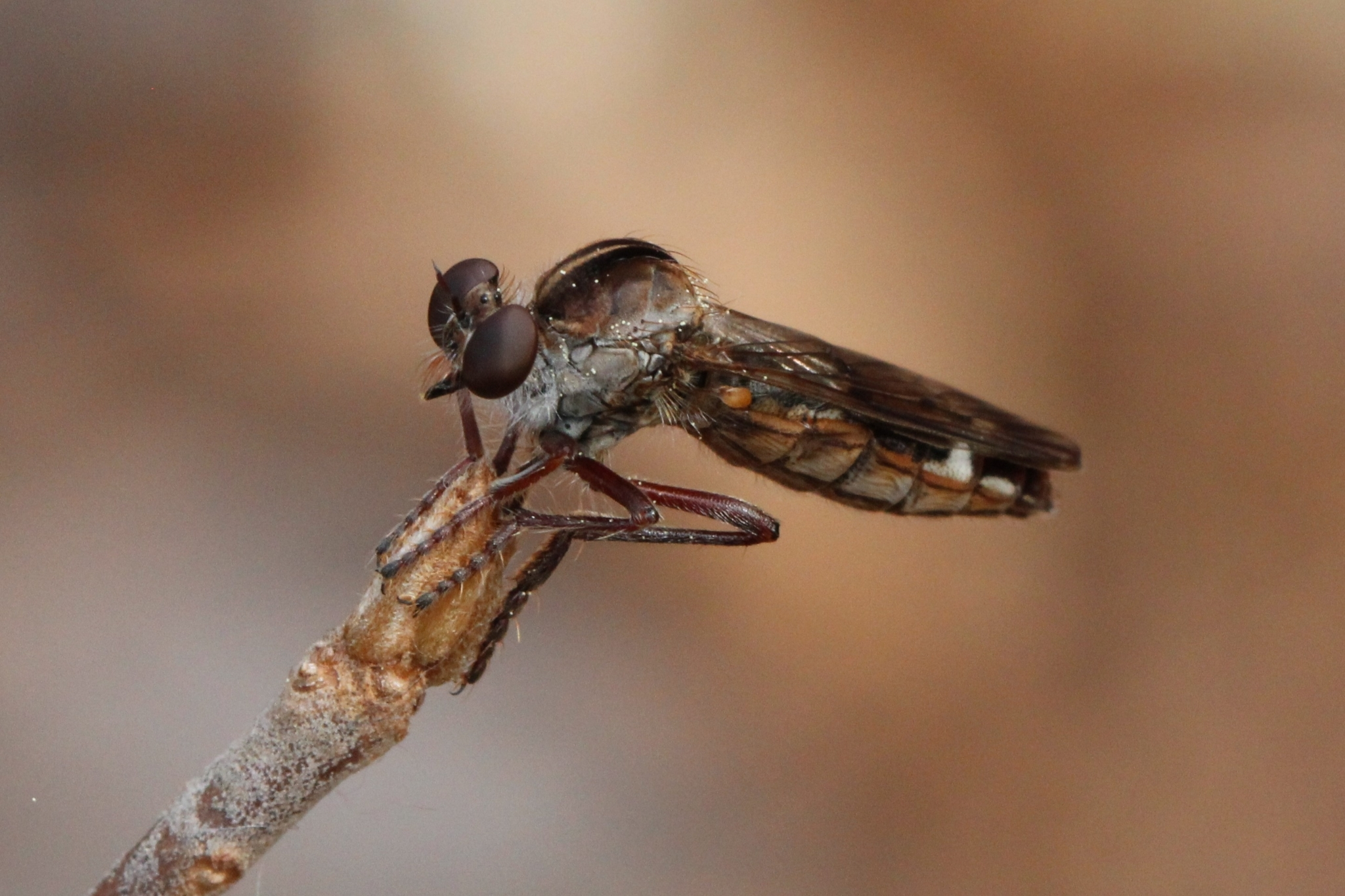
- Nicocles pictus

Scientific classification
- Kingdom: Animalia
- Phylum: Arthropoda
- Class: Insecta
- Order: Diptera
- Family: Asilidae
- Subfamily: Dasypogoninae
- Tribe: Dasypogonini
- Genus: Nicocles; Jaennicke, 1867

= Nicocles (fly) =

Genus of flies

Nicocles is a genus of robber flies in the family Asilidae. There are about 15 described species in the genus.

== Species ==
- Nicocles abdominalis Williston, 1883
- Nicocles aemulator (Loew, 1872)
- Nicocles analis Jaennicke, 1867
- Nicocles argentatus Coquillett, 1893
- Nicocles bromleyi Hardy, 1943
- Nicocles canadensis Curran, 1923
- Nicocles dives (Loew, 1866)
- Nicocles engelhardti Wilcox, 1946
- Nicocles lomae Cole, 1916
- Nicocles pictus (Loew, 1866)
- Nicocles politus (Say, 1823)
- Nicocles pollinosus (Wilcox, 1946)
- Nicocles reinhardi Bromley, 1934
- Nicocles rufus Williston, 1883
- Nicocles utahensis Banks, 1920
