= Liberty Monument (Nicosia) =

Monument to anti-British fighters in Cyprus

Coordinates: 35°10′17.6″N 33°22′13.1″E

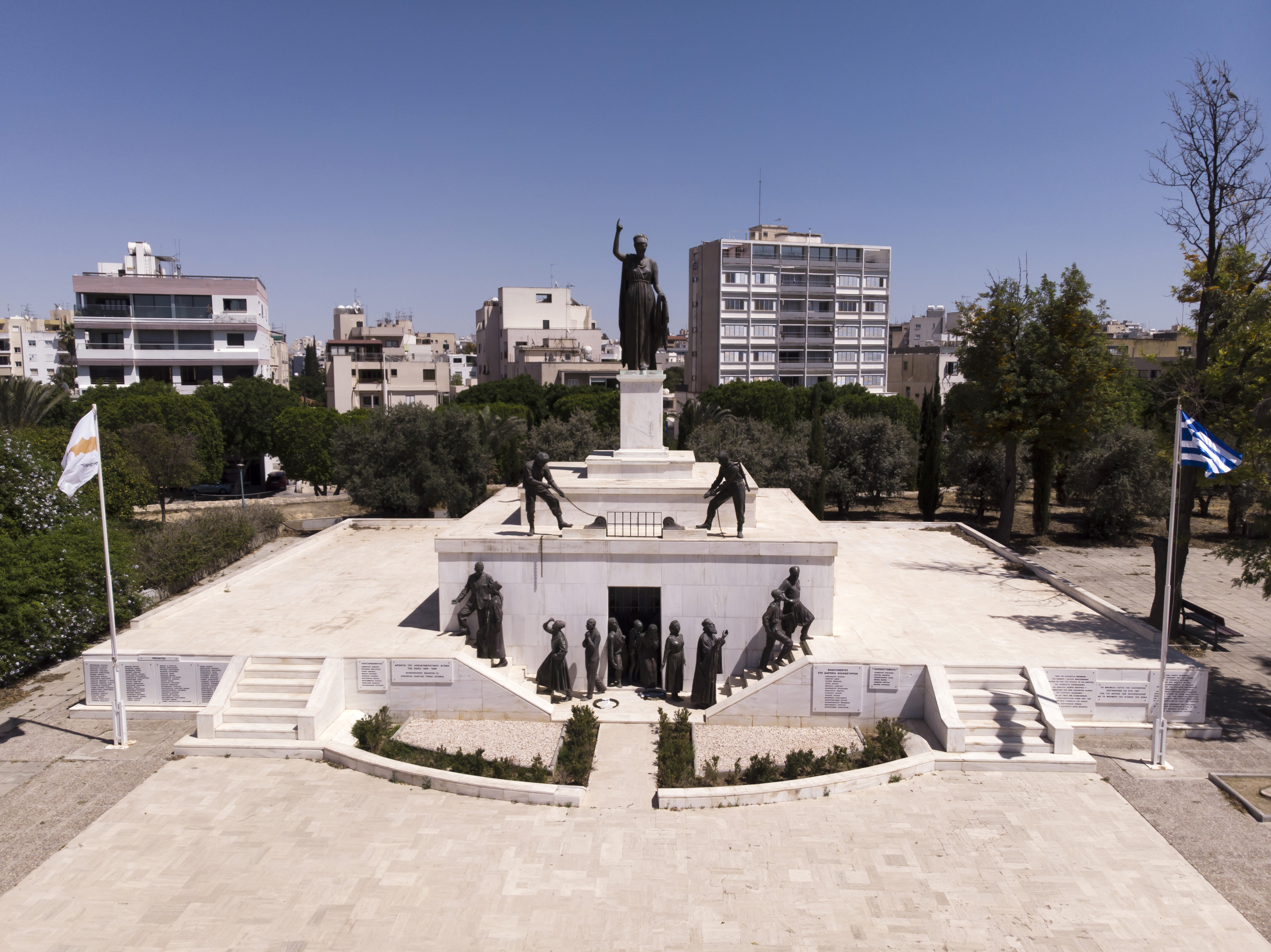
The monument

The Liberty Monument (Greek: Μνημείο Ελευθερίας, "Mnēmeío Eleftherías" or "Eleftheria Monument") is a monument in the city of Nicosia in Cyprus.

The Liberty Monument was erected in 1973 to honor the anti-British EOKA fighters of the Cyprus Emergency of 1955–1959. It is located at the Podocattaro Bastion of the Venetian walls.

The large monument contains several statues. Atop the structure, a statue representing liberty watches over two heroic EOKA fighters pulling chains to open a prison gate, allowing Greek Cypriot prisoners, peasants, and clergy (represented by various statues) to escape British rule.
