= Pnytagoras =

King of Salamis in Cyprus from 351 to 331 BC

Pnytagoras (Greek: Πνυταγόρας) was a king of the Ancient Greek city-state of Salamis in Cyprus. He was the nephew and successor of Evagoras II, who was overthrown in 351 BC and exiled due to his pro-Achaemenid stance.

He supported the anti-Achaemenid rebellion of King Tennes of Sidon (Diodorus Siculus, XVI.42.5), but was then besieged by Phocion and his uncle Evagoras, and was forced to surrender. The Aechaemenid king Artaxerxes III, however, surprisingly confirmed him in his position, instead of reinstalling Evagoras (Diodorus Siculus, XVI.40.5, XVI.42, XVI.46.2). He was still on the throne when Alexander the Great launched his invasion of the Achaemenid Empire, and joined the Macedonian king after his victory at the Battle of Issus. He assisted Alexander at the Siege of Tyre, where he lost his flagship, and received the city of Tamassos as a reward (Duris of Samos, FGrH 76.F4). He was then succeeded by his son Nicocreon.

Preceded by Evagoras II	King of Salamis; 351–331 BC	Succeeded by Nicocreon
