= Ismail Tosun =

Turkish-Australian celebrity chef

İsmail Tosun
- Born: 1975 (age 50–51); Melbourne, Australia
- Culinary career
- Cooking style: Turkish, Ottoman, Cypriot
- Award won: Australia's Best New Talent 2007

Ismail Tosun (born 1975) is an acclaimed Turkish Australian celebrity chef who was voted the best new talent in Australia. Tosun is the founder of Eminem, a Turkish restaurant in Nedlands which earned the title of best new talent in the country at the Australian Gourmet Traveller 2007 Restaurant Guide Awards.

== Biography ==
Tosun's father is from Turkey and his mother is from Cyprus. His parents divorced when he was nine years old and he was raised by his mothers parents in Melbourne till he was sixteen. Tosun's grandfather was a butcher and his grandmother was a housewife which inspired him to become a chef as food was a central part of life.

Tosun got a job washing dishes in Sydney Road in Melbourne for $60 a week at the age of sixteen. He then started an apprenticeship in an Ottoman restaurant in Canberra where he worked under Australia's modern Turkish chef Şerif Kaya. He finally opened his acclaimed Eminem restaurant in Perth however shut it soon after being awarded 'best new talent' at the Australian Gourmet Traveler 2007 Restaurant Guide Awards.

After leaving Perth, Tosun travelled briefly to Istanbul. Upon his return to Australia, he settled in Collingwood, Victoria, and opened a new Turkish restaurant called Gigibaba.
