= Evagoras I =

King of Salamis on Cyprus from 411 to 374 BC

- Reign: c. 411 – 374 BC
- Born: Salamis, Cyprus
- Died: 374 BC
- Ancient Greek: Εὐαγόρας
- Religion: Ancient Greek religion

Evagoras or Euagoras (Ancient Greek: Εὐαγόρας) was the king of Salamis in Cyprus from 411 to 374 BC, and was known especially from the work of Isocrates, who presents him as a model ruler.

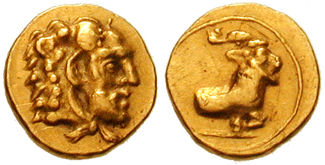
1/10th stater, (411–374 BC), 0.71 g, SNG Copenhagen 733597

== Early life ==
Evagoras claimed descent from Teucer, the son of Telamon and half-brother of Ajax, and his family had long been rulers of Salamis, although during his childhood, Salamis came under Phoenician control, which resulted in his exile. While in Cilicia, Evagoras gathered the support of 50 followers and returned secretly in 410 BC, to gain possession of the throne. Expecting an eventual Persian response to recapture Cyprus, he cultivated the friendship of the Athenians, and after Conon's defeat at the Battle of Aegospotami he provided him with a refuge. For a time, he also maintained friendly relations with the Achaemenid Empire, and secured the aid of Artaxerxes II for Athens against Sparta. He took part in the Battle of Cnidus of 394 BC which he provided most of the resources for and in which the Lacedaemonian fleet was defeated thanks to his efforts, and for this service his statue was placed by the Athenians side by side with that of Conon in the Kerameikos.

== War against Persians ==
However, relations between Evagoras and the Persians became strained. From 391 BC, they were virtually at war. Aided by the Athenians and the Egyptian king Hakor, Evagoras extended his rule over the greater part of Cyprus, crossed over to Anatolia, took several cities in Phoenicia (including Tyre), and persuaded the Cilicians to revolt. One result of the Peace of Antalcidas (387 BC), to which Evagoras refused to agree, was that the Athenians withdrew their support, since by its terms they recognized the lordship of Persia over Cyprus.

In the following years Evagoras carried on hostilities single-handed, except for occasional aid from Egypt, which was likewise threatened by the Persians. While Evagoras was in Egypt asking for help, his younger son Pnytagoras was in charge of Salamis.

The Persian generals Tiribazus and Orontes invaded Cyprus in 385 BC, with an army far larger than what Evagoras could command. However, Evagoras managed to cut off this force from being resupplied, and the starving troops rebelled. The war then turned in the Persian favor when Evagoras's fleet was destroyed at the Battle of Citium, and he was compelled to flee to Salamis. Here, although closely blockaded, Evagoras held his ground, and took advantage of a quarrel between the two Persian generals to conclude peace (376 BC).

Evagoras was allowed to remain nominally king of Salamis, but was a vassal of Persia, to which he was to pay a yearly tribute. The chronology of the last part of his reign is uncertain. In 374 BC, he was assassinated by a eunuch from motives of private revenge. He was succeeded by his son, Nicocles.

== Legacy ==
According to Isocrates's Panegyricus, Evagoras was a model ruler, whose aim was to promote the welfare of his state and of his subjects by the cultivation of Greek refinement and civilization. Isocrates also states that many people migrated from Greece to Cyprus because of the noble rule of Evagoras. Other sources of this period—Diodorus Siculus 14.115, 15.2-9; Xenophon, Hellenica 4.8—are not as unrestrainedly complimentary. Lysias in his Against Andocides 6.28 addresses him as the king of Cyprus.

Although Cypriots were Greeks and their language a dialect of Greek, the Arcadocypriot, they used to write in an older and more difficult system, called the Cypriot syllabary. Evagoras has been called a pioneer of the adoption of the Greek alphabet in Cyprus in place of the older Cypriot syllabary.

Preceded by Abdemon	King of Salamis; 411–374 BC	Succeeded by Nicocles
