= Nicocles of Salamis =

4th-century BCE king of Salamis on Cyprus

Nicocles (Greek: Νικοκλῆς, Nikoklēs) was an Ancient Cyprian Greek king of Salamis, Cyprus. In 374/373 BC, he succeeded his (presumed) father Evagoras I. Nicocles continued the philhellenic politics of his father. Nicocles probably died together with Straton of Sidon during the revolt of satraps (362 to 360 BC). He was followed as the king of Salamis by his son Evagoras II.

Some authors have proposed that Nicocles had participated in the conspiracy in which his father Evagoras was killed, but there is no authority for this supposition. Rather this idea seems to have arisen as a means of explaining the strange error made by Diodorus Siculus in considering Nicocles as the eunuch who assassinated Evagoras.

Little is known of the reign of Nicocles, but it appears to have been one of peace and prosperity. Based on statements of Isocrates, his panegyrist, (who addressed two of his orations to him and has made him the subject of another), under his rule his kingdom flourished, he replenished the treasury, which had been exhausted by his father's wars, without oppressing his subjects with exorbitant taxes, and behaved in all respects as the model of a mild and equitable ruler. Isocrates also praises him for his interest in literature and philosophy, and supports this by noting that Nicocles rewarding Isocrates for his panegyric with the magnificent present of twenty talents (Vit. X. Orat. p. 838, a.). In addition, he praises him for the purity of his domestic relations; although Theopompus and Anaximenes of Lampsacus (ap. Athen. xii. p. 531) state that he was a person of luxurious habits who had vied with Straton, king of Sidon, in the splendour and refinement of his feasts and other sensual indulgences. Theopompus and Anaximenes of Lampsacus also state that Nicocles ultimately died a violent death, but neither the date nor the circumstances surrounding this event are recorded.

Preceded by Evagoras I	King of Salamis; 374/373–361 BC	Succeeded by Evagoras II
