= List of Turkish Germans =

The following is a list of notable Turkish Germans. This includes people of full or partial ethnic Turkish origin born in Germany, as well as ethnic Turkish immigrants who have arrived in Germany either from the Seljuk and Ottoman territories or from post-Ottoman modern nation-states (especially from the Republic of Turkey, but also from the Balkans, Cyprus, as well as other parts of the Levant and North Africa).

Most notable Turkish Germans originate from the Republic of Turkey; however, there are also notable Germans of ethnic Turkish origin who came from Seljuk Anatolia (e.g. Sadok Seli Soltan) and the Ottoman Empire (e.g. Friedrich Aly, Fatima Kariman and Mehmet von Königstreu). In addition, there are notable ethnic Turks who come from other post-Ottoman modern nation-states, especially from the Balkans (e.g. Ozan Güven, Filiz Osmanodja, Erol Sabanov, and Kemal Kurt are of Turkish Bulgarian origin; Hüdai Ülker is of Turkish Macedonian origin; Ateed and Cemile Giousouf are of Turkish Western Thracian origin), the island of Cyprus (e.g. Turgay Hilmi, Atesh Salih, and Rüya Taner are of Turkish Cypriot origin), the Levant (e.g. Yasemin Mansoor is of Turkish Iraqi origin; Burak Karan is of Turkish Syrian origin; and Bilal Aziz Özer is of Turkish Lebanese origin), etc.

This list is arranged alphabetically by surname following the Turkish alphabet arrangement. Notable ethnic Turks who originate from outside the modern borders of Turkey (i.e. from the Balkans, Cyprus, the Levant, etc.) are listed with their origin. Furthermore, individuals who are of partial Turkish origin are listed with their dual identity.

== Academia and medicine ==
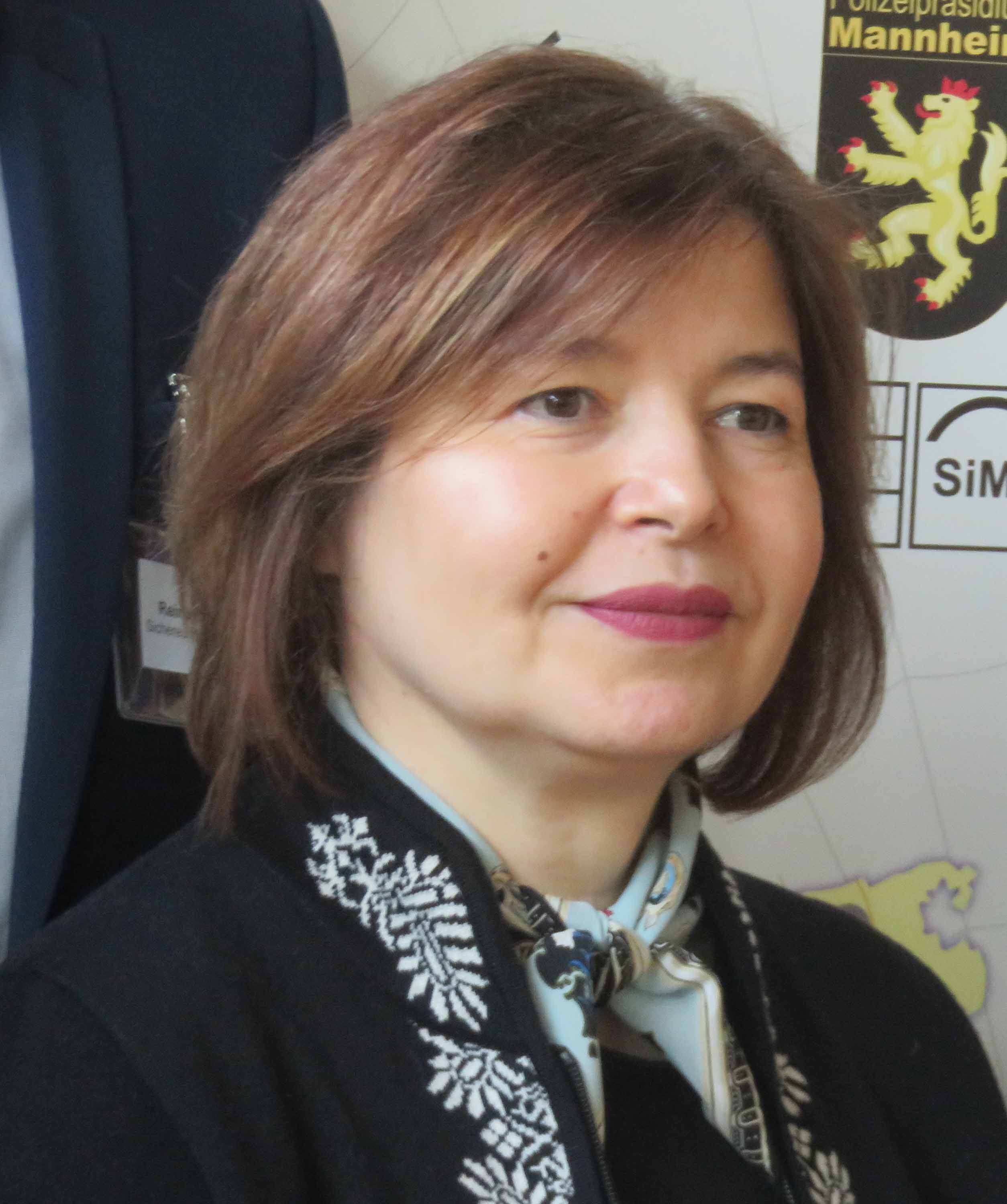
Havva Engin

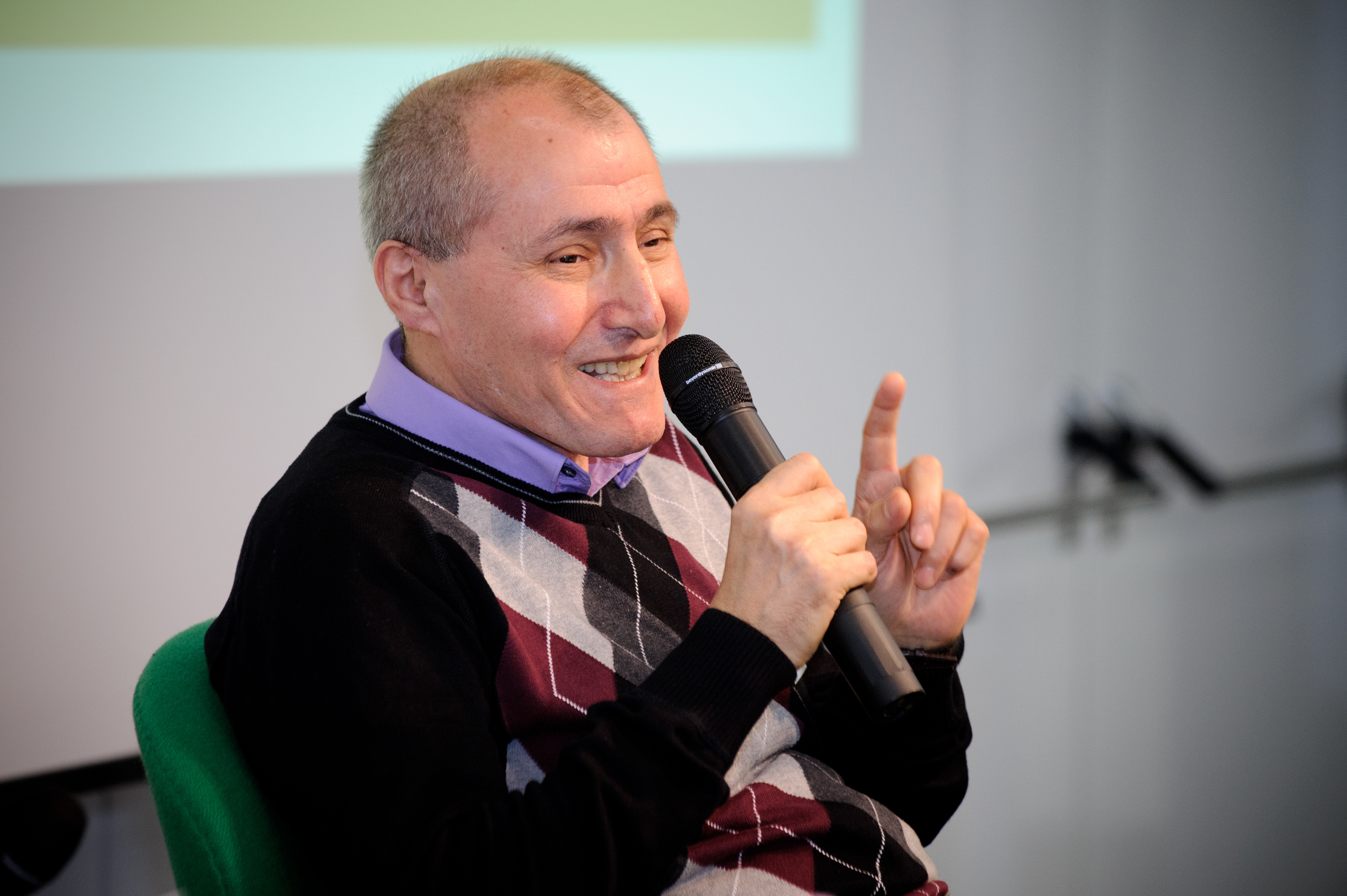
Kazım Erdoğan

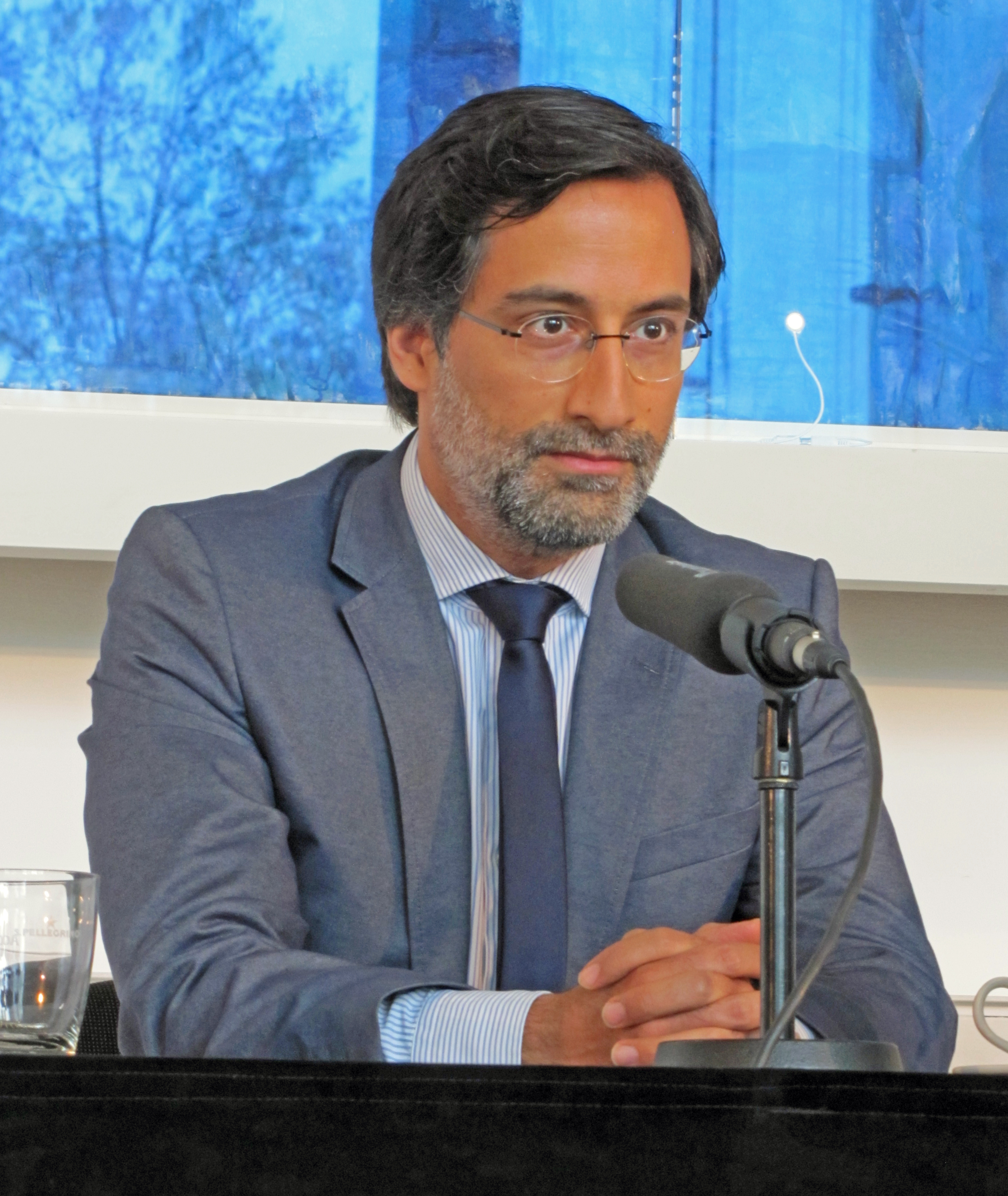
Alexander Görlach

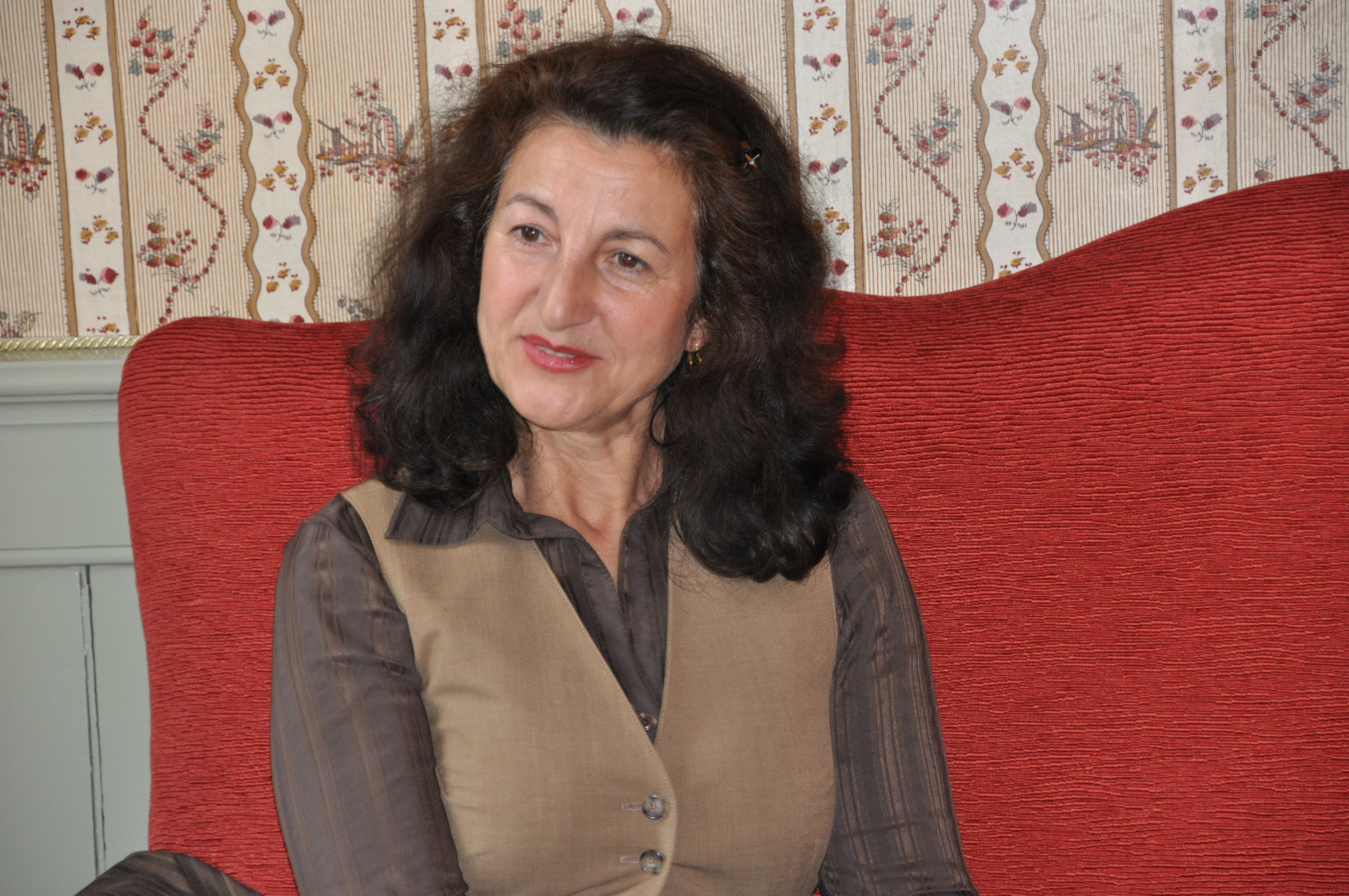
Necla Kelek

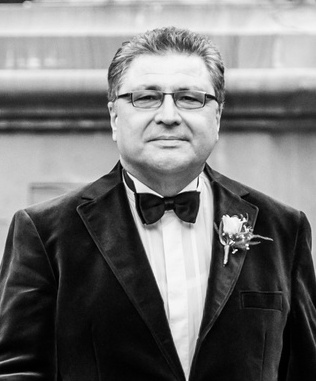
Arif Babür Ordu

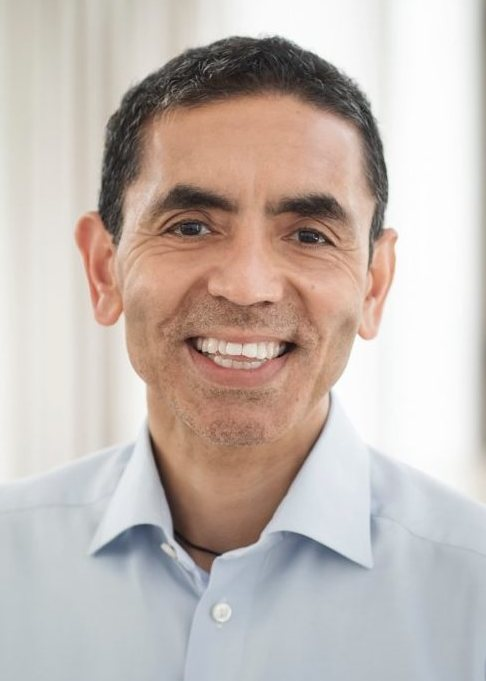
Uğur Şahin

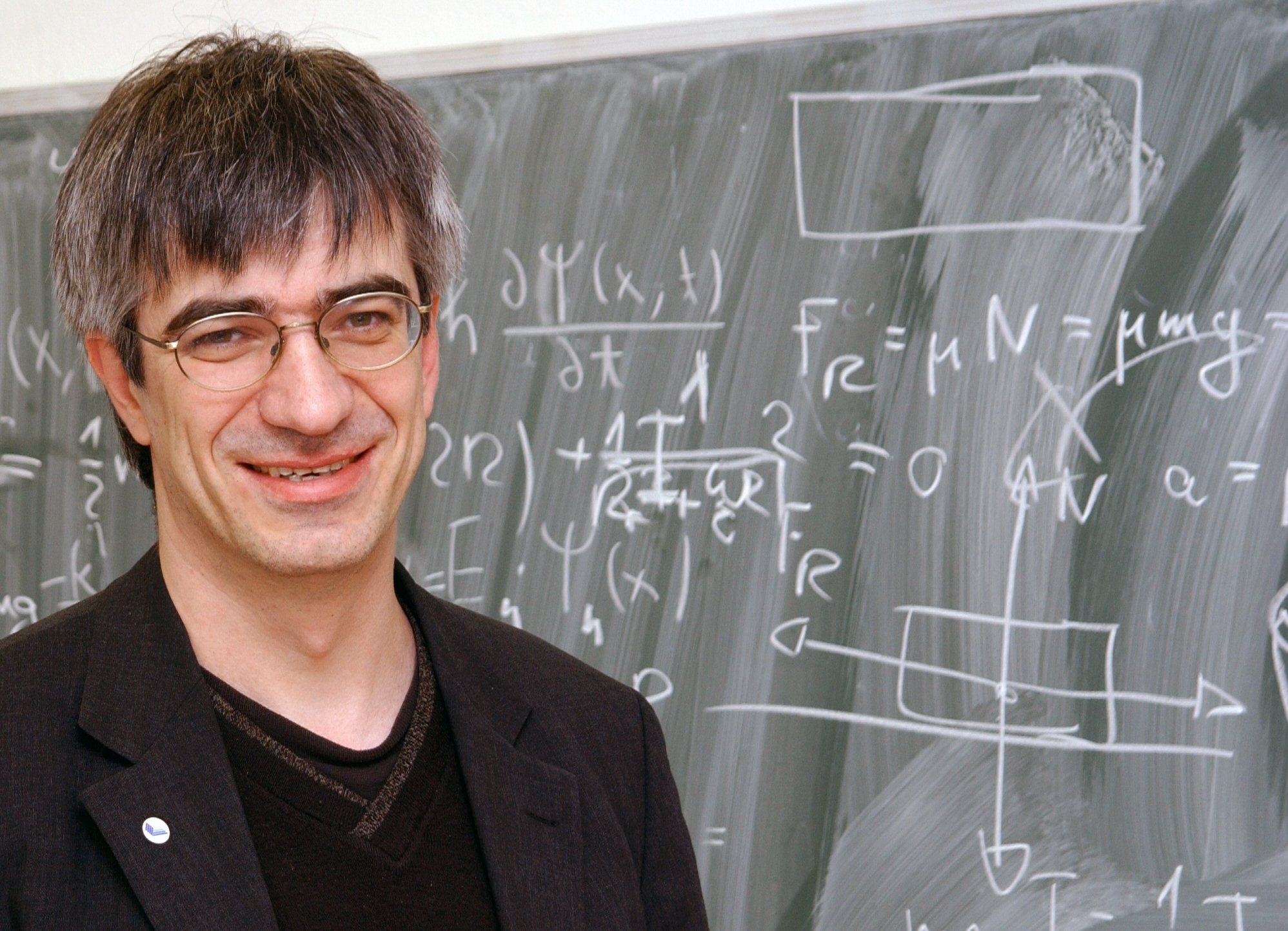
Metin Tolan

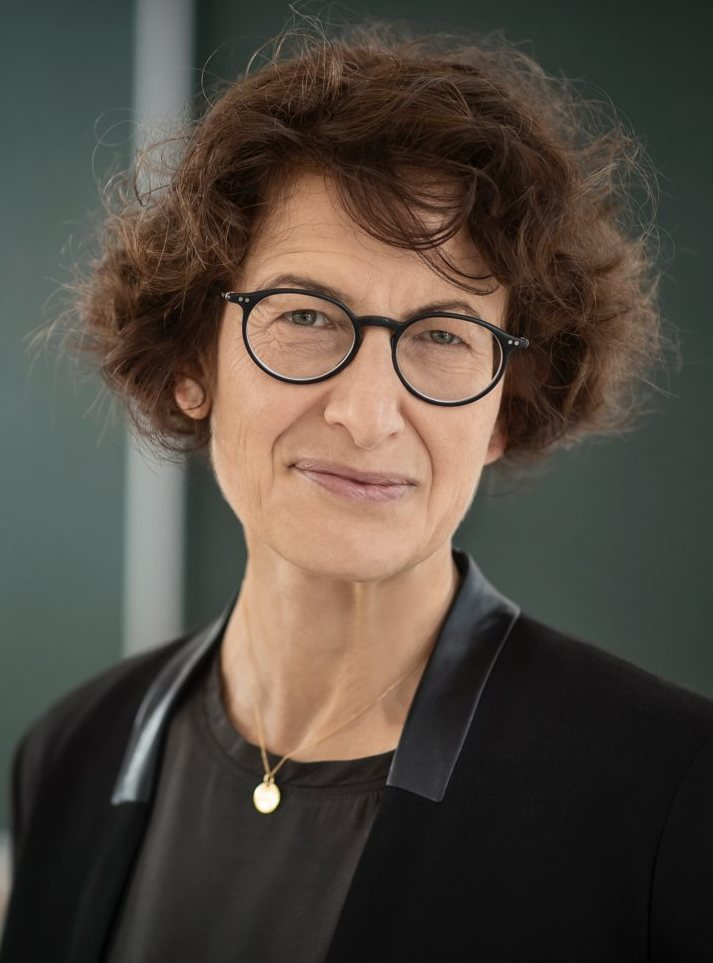
Özlem Türeci

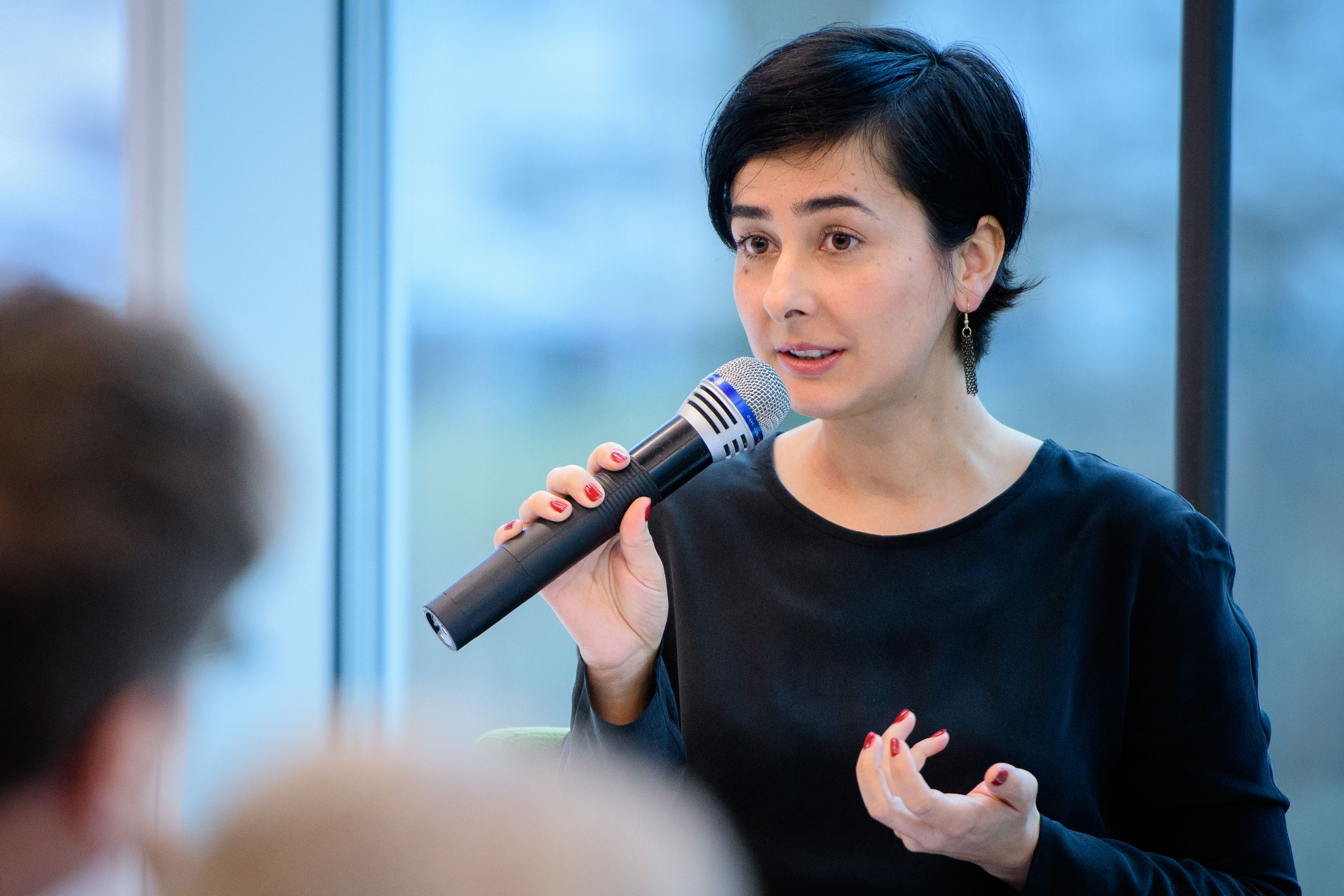
Aysel Yollu-Tok

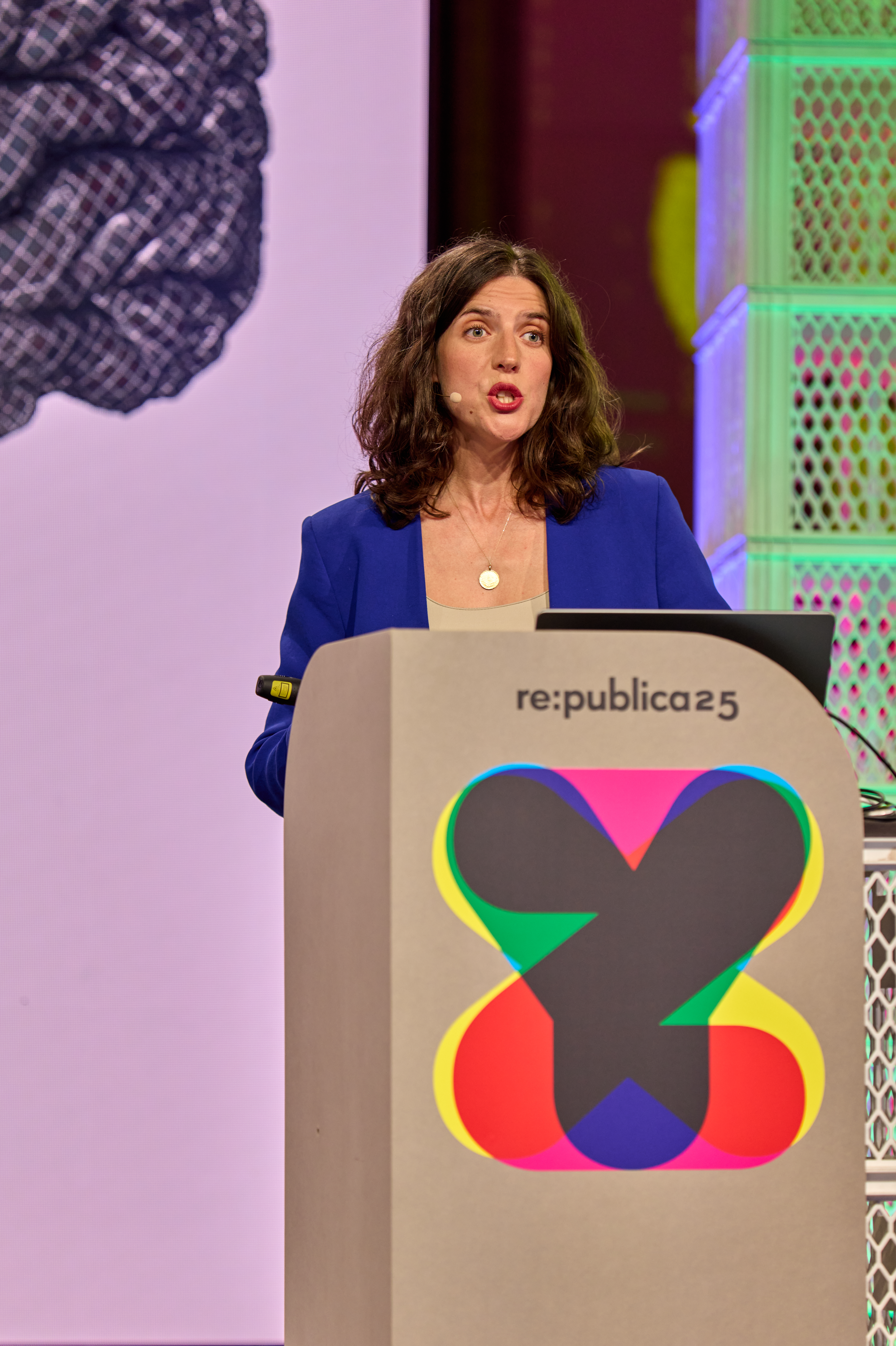
Fatma Deniz

- Mustafa Acar, political scientist; co-founder of the European Center for Constitutional and Human Rights
- Ufuk Akcigit, Professor of Economics at the University of Chicago
- Gülşen Aktaş, educator
- Ian F. Akyildiz, Chair Professor in Telecommunications
- Şahin Albayrak, Professor of Computer Science at Technische Universität Berlin
- Anil Al-Rebholz, sociologist; Professor at the University of Frankfurt am Main
- Götz Aly, journalist, historian and political scientist
- Yaşar Aydın, social scientist; lecturer at the HafenCity University Hamburg
- Mehmet Kudret Ayiter, legal scholar and founding member of Dokuz Eylül University
- Ülkü Azrak, Professor of Political Sciences
- Yaşar Bilgin, doctor and politician; co-founder and chairman of the Turkish-German Health Foundation
- Ümit Bir, doctor and art collector (Turkish father and German mother)
- Dr. Elif Duygu Cindik-Herbrueggen, psychiatrist
- Metin Colpan, co-founder of Qiagen
- Altay Coşkun, Associate Professor of Classical Studies at the University of Waterloo
- Hasan Çil, sociologist
- Gazi Çağlar, political scientist
- Ahmet Çakır (ergonomist), ergonomist; editor-in-chief of the scientific journal Behaviour & Information Technology
- Hıdır Eren Çelik, teaches at the University of Cologne
- Fatma Deniz, president of Technische Universität Berlin
- Ahmet Doğan, founder of the Ararat-Verlag publishing house
- Havva Engin, linguist and educational scientist
- Kazım Erdoğan, psychologist and sociologist
- Semra Eren-Nijhar, sociologist
- Erol Erman, architect
- Ali Ertürk a neuroscientist, inventor, He is the director of a new Helmholtz Institute on Tissue Engineering and Regenerative Medicine (iTERM) in Munich
- İlhan Ilkılıç, doctor and philosopher
- Hüseyin Ince, Professor of Cardiology
- Mustafa Kizilcay, Professor of Electrical Engineering at the University of Siegen
- A. Kubilay Ertan, physician
- Deniz Göktürk, Germanist (Turkish father and German mother)
- Alexander Görlach, senior research associate at Cambridge University
- Zümrüt Gülbay-Peischard, Professor of Business Law at the Berlin School of Economics and Law
- Onur Güntürkün, Professor of Behavioral Neuroscience at Ruhr University Bochum
- Dilek Gürsoy, heart surgeon; the first female surgeon in Europe to implant an artificial heart
- Osman Isfen, Professor of Law at the University of Hagen
- Zehra İpşiroğlu, Professor of Turkish Literature at the University of Duisburg-Essen (1998–2009)
- Ismail Kanay, philosopher and internist
- Yasemin Karakaşoğlu, Turkologist; Vice President for Internationality and Diversity at the University of Bremen (2011–17)
- Necla Kelek, feminist and social scientist
- Recep Keskin, Professor of Architecture and Civil Engineering at the Anhalt University of Applied Sciences
- Caghan Kizil, neuroscientist and geneticist
- Esra Küçük, social scientist; managing director of Allianz Kulturstiftung (Turkish father and Macedonian mother)
- Elçin Kürşat-Ahlers, sociologist; Professor at Leibniz Universität Hannover
- Enise Lauterbach, cardiologist
- Rasim Marz, historian and expert on the Ottoman Empire and modern Turkey
- Murat Mola, Professor of Engineering at the Institute for Mechanical Engineering / Materials Science at the Ruhr West University of Applied Sciences
- Aylâ Neusel, Vice President of the University of Kassel (1986–90)
- Arif Babür Ordu, doctor and former politician
- Cem Özgönül, historian
- Harun Parlar, chemist
- Asaf Pekdeğer, geoscientists and Professor of Hydrogeology at the Free University of Berlin
- Sanih Savdir, dentist; awarded the Bavarian Order of Merit in 2007
- Fuat Sezgin
- Ziya Saylan, former president of the European Academy of Cosmetic Surgery
- Yücel Sivri, Germanist, ancient historian, writer and translator
- Uğur Şahin, Professor of Experimental Oncology at the University of Mainz; co-founder of BioNTech which developed the first approved messenger RNA-based vaccine against COVID-19
- Faruk Şen, former director of the Stiftung für Türkeistudien und Integrationsforschung and professor at the University of Essen
- Sargut Şölçün, literary scholar
- Oktay Tabasaran,
- Erman Tanyıldız, founder of SRH Berlin University of Applied Sciences
- Sabriye Tenberken, tibetologist and co-founder of the organisation Braille Without Borders
- Semih Tezcan, Turkologist
- Metin Tolan, Professor of Experimental Physics at the TU Dortmund University
- Sefaattin Tongay, Professor of Materials Science and Engineering at Arizona State University
- Ahmet Toprak, Professor of Educational Sciences at Dortmund University of Applied Sciences and Arts
- Erdal Toprakyaran, director of the Zentrum für Islamische Theologie (Universität Tübingen) at the University of Tübingen
- Özlem Türeci, physician and scientist; Privatdozentin at Johannes Gutenberg University; co-founder of BioNTech which developed the first approved messenger RNA-based vaccine against COVID-19
- Ali Uçar, political scientist
- Bülent Uçar, Professor of Islamic Studies at the Osnabrück University
- Hacı-Halil Uslucan, psychologist; head of the Foundation Center for Turkish Studies and Integration Research
- Yasemin Utku, Professor for Urban Development and Planning Practice at the Technical University of Cologne
- Recep Ümit Uygun, doctor; he received the Order of Merit of Berlin in 1993
- Altuğ Ünlü, Professor of Music Theory at the Robert Schumann Hochschule
- Bânu Yalkut-Breddermann, ethnologist
- Ali Yarayan, Professor and Director of the Research Center for Turkish Law at the University of Erlangen–Nuremberg
- Ümit Yazıcıoğlu, political scientist
- Karin Yeşilada, Germanist and literary critic (Turkish father and German mother)
- Aysel Yollu-Tok, economist and sociologist; director of Harriet Taylor Mill Institute for Economics and Gender Studies at the Berlin School of Economics and Law
- Gökçe Yurdakul, Professor of Sociology; Director for Berlin Institute of Migration Research at the Humboldt University of Berlin (2023–25)
- Mukadder Seyhan Yücel, Professor of German at Trakya University

== Arts and literature ==
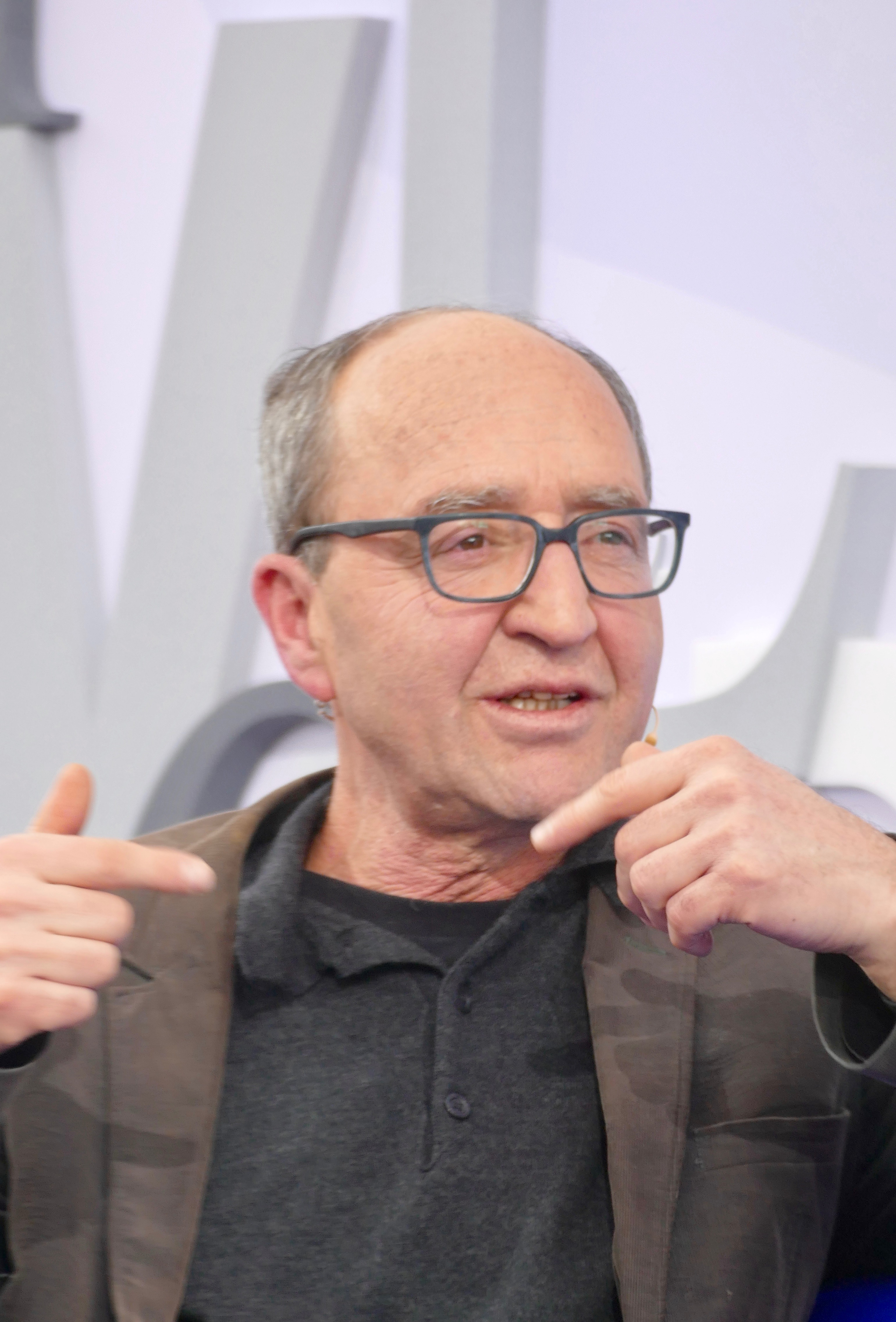
Doğan Akhanlı

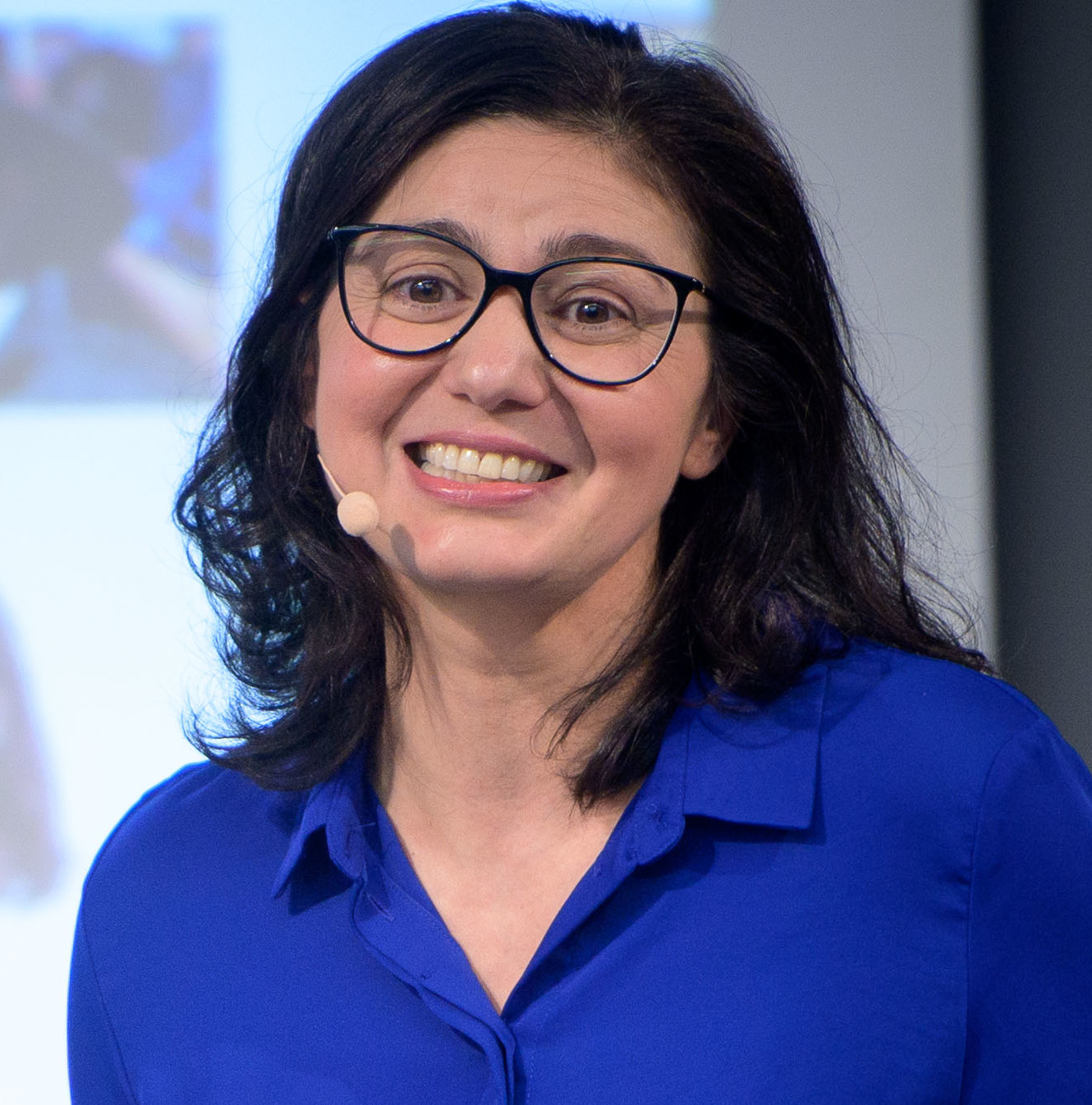
Hatice Akyün

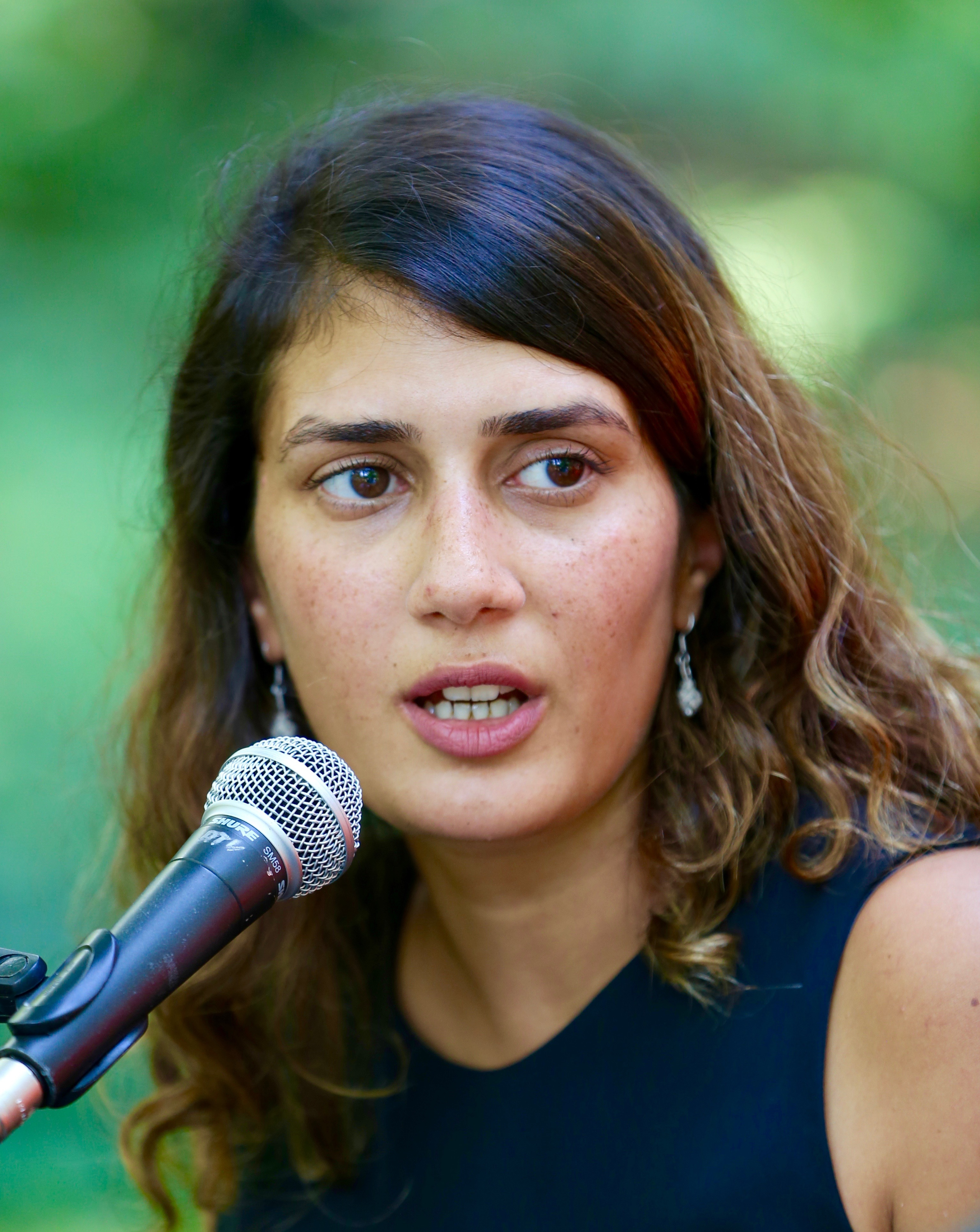
Fatma Aydemir

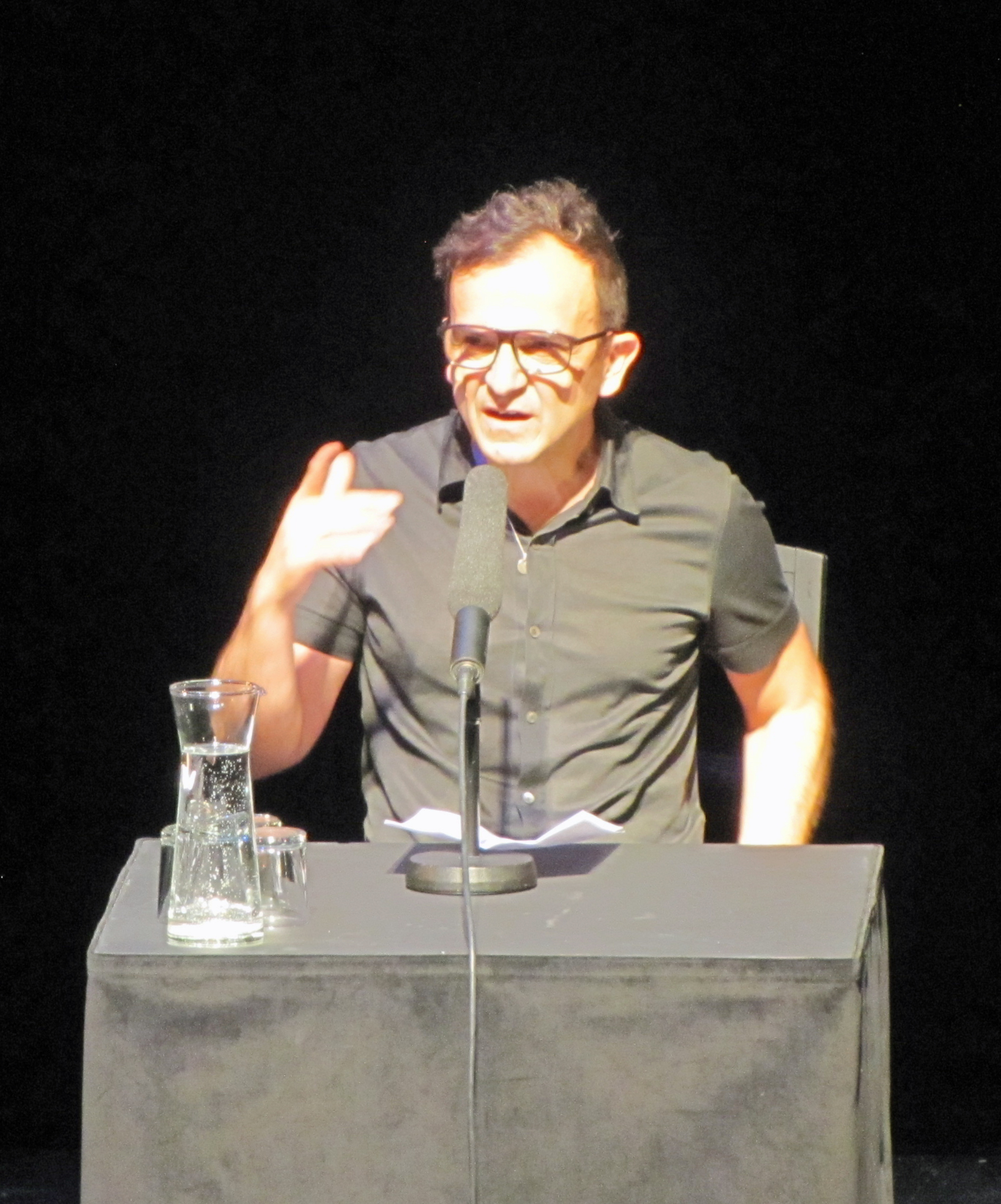
İmran Ayata

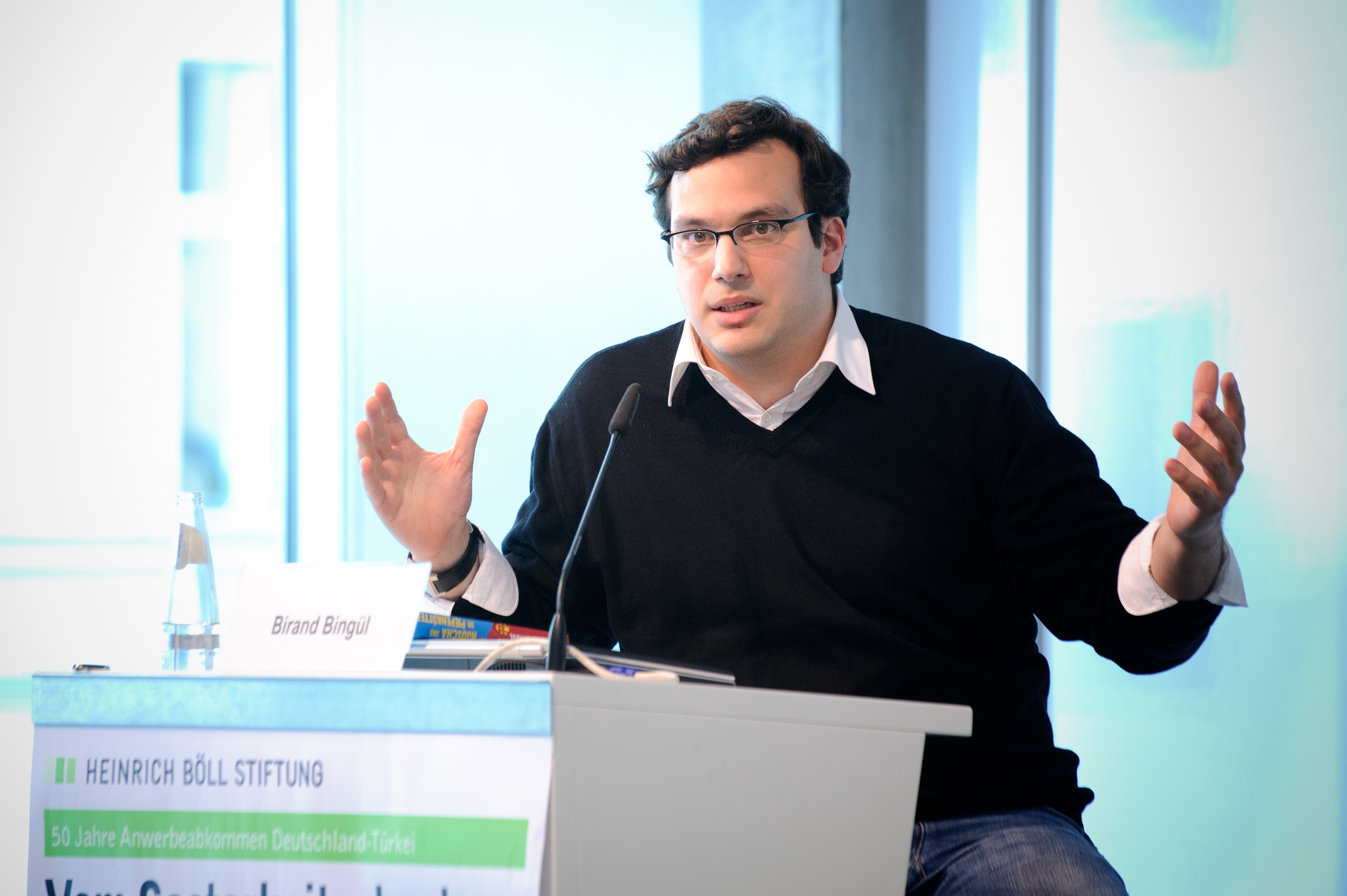
Birand Bingül

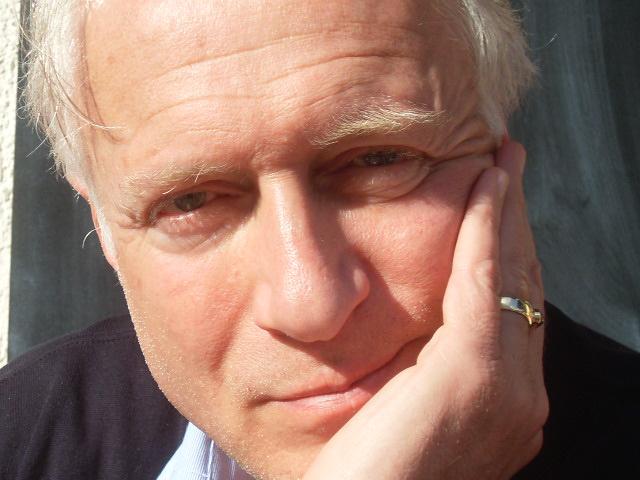
Hasan Cobanli

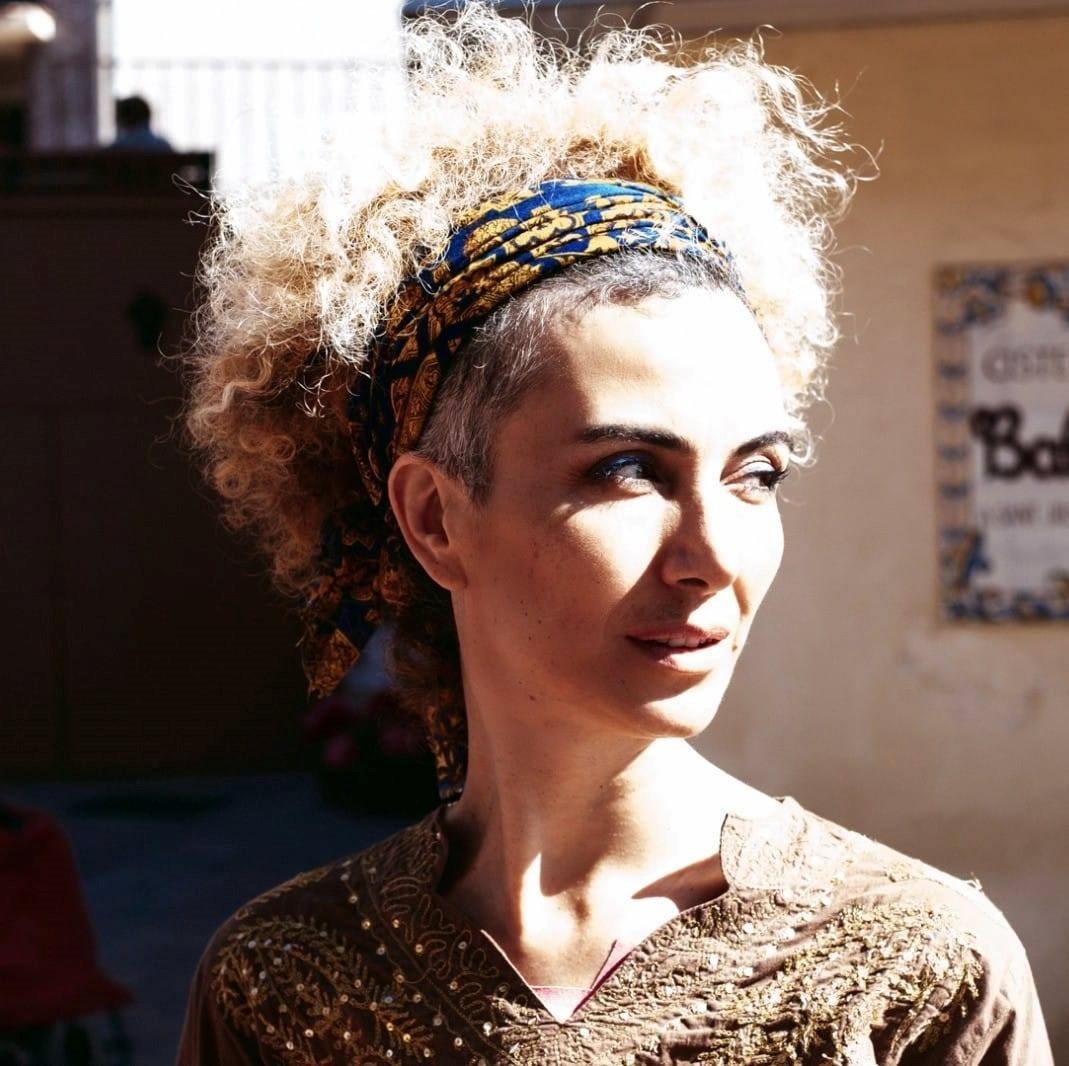
Ninel Çam

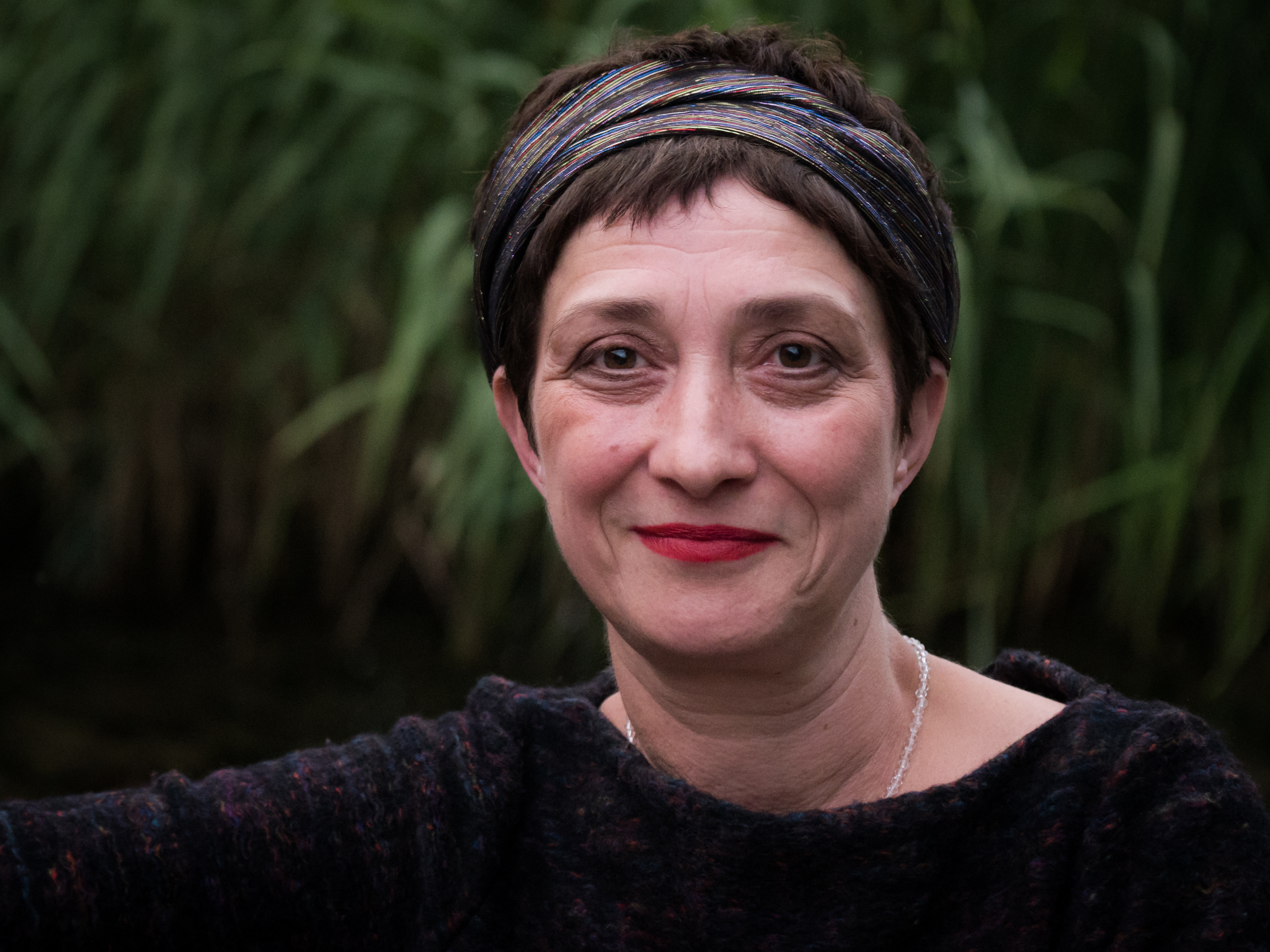
Zehra Çırak

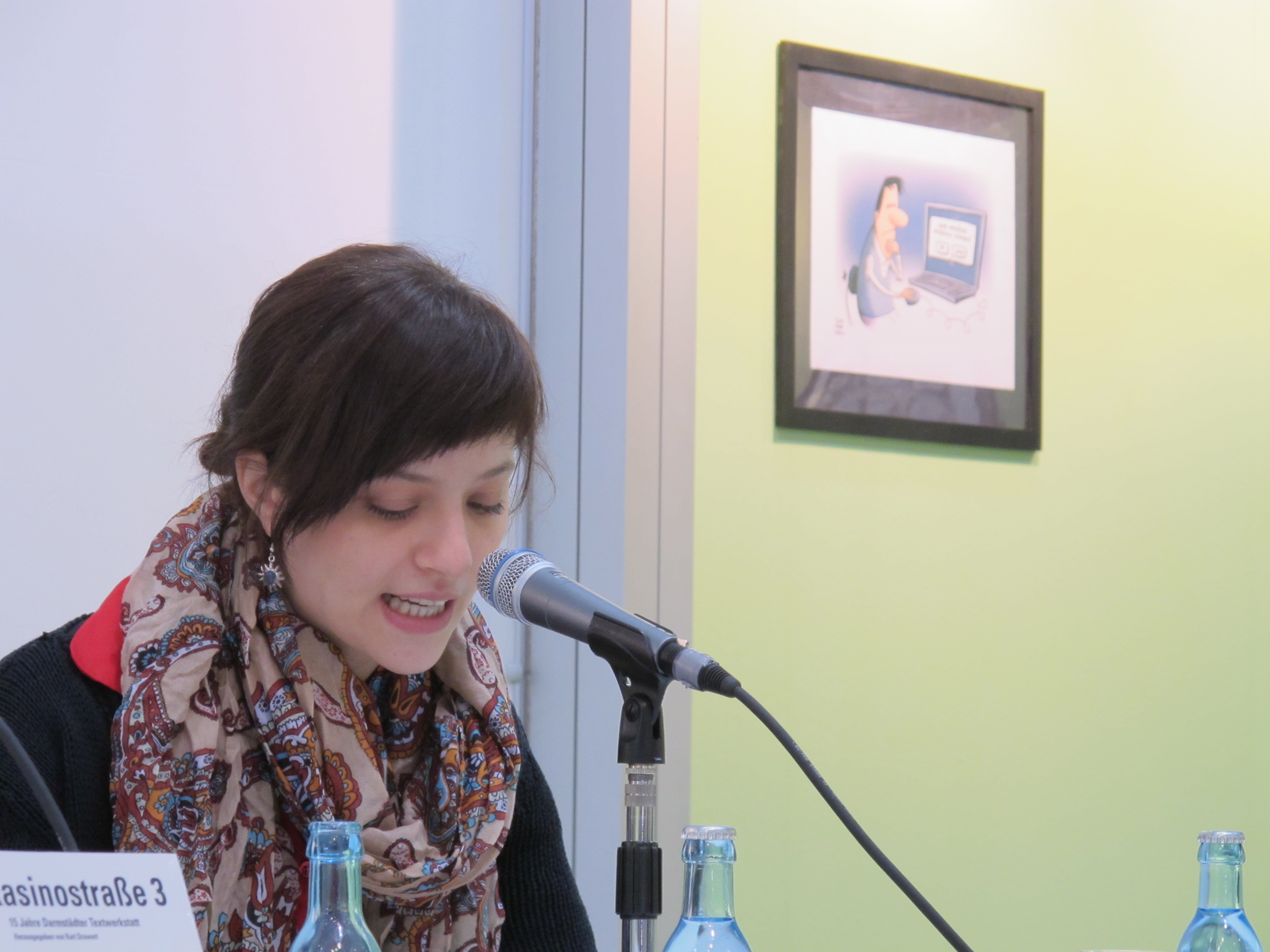
Özlem Özgül Dündar

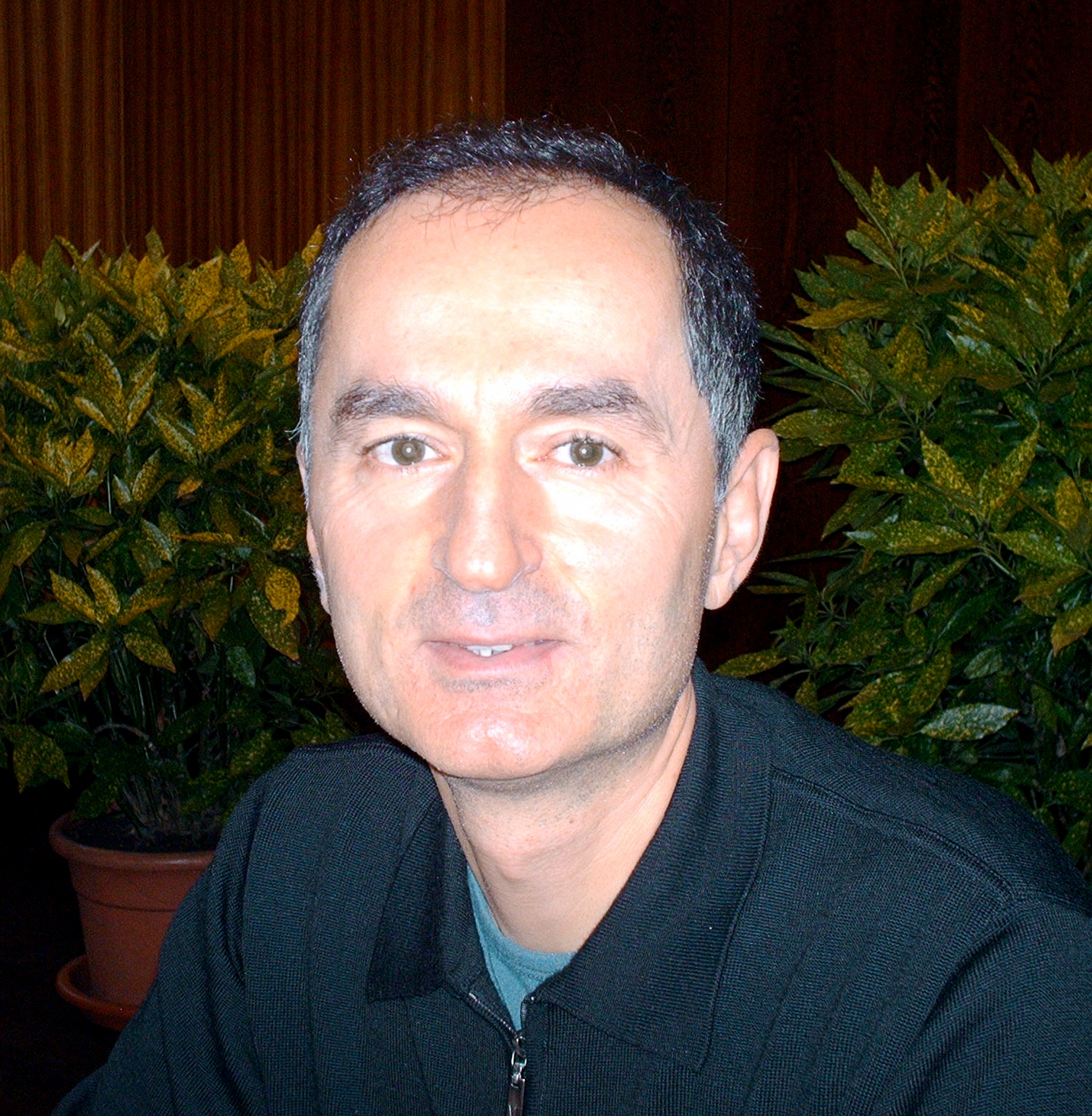
Osman Engin

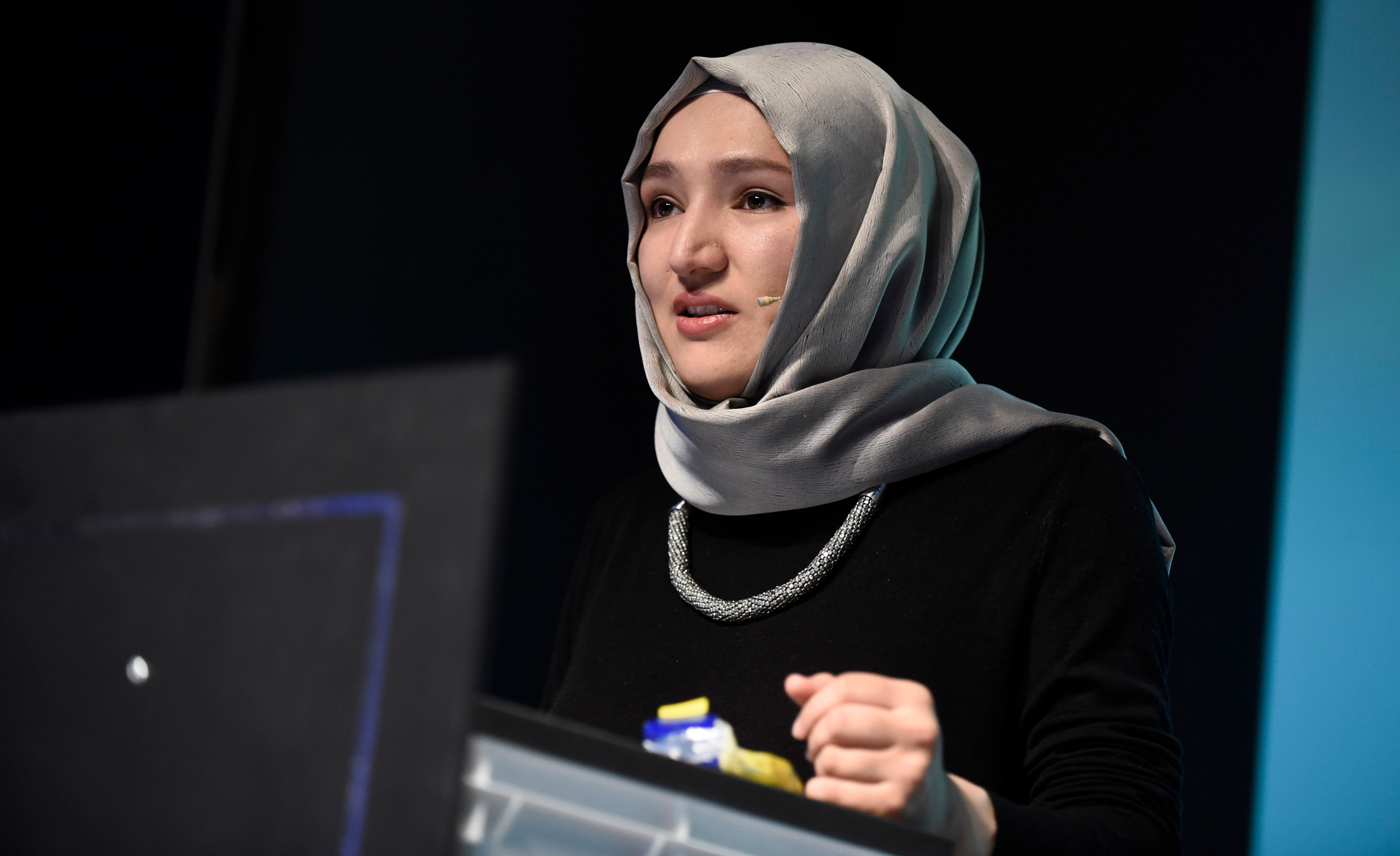
Kübra Gümüşay

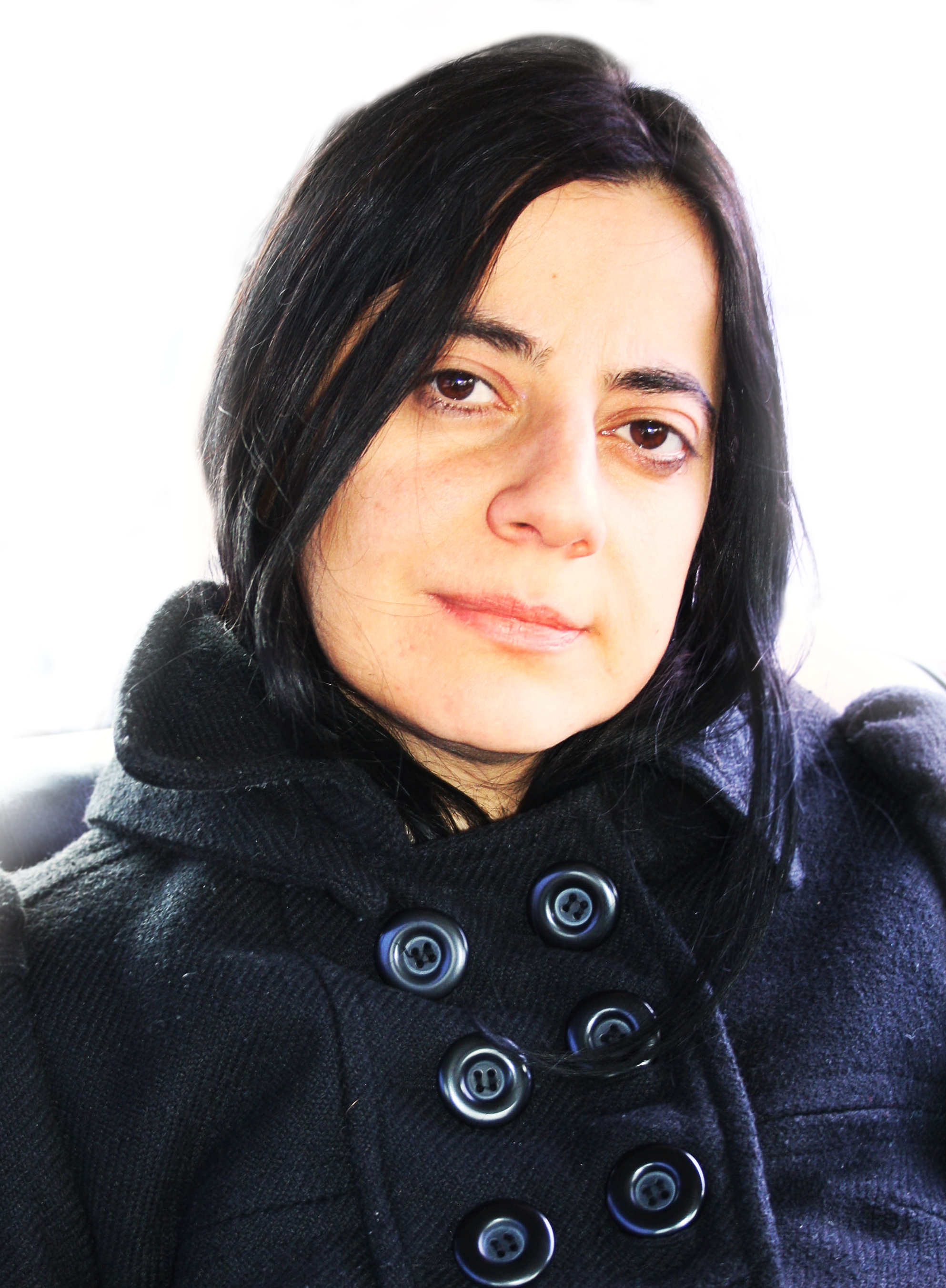
Lütfiye Güzel

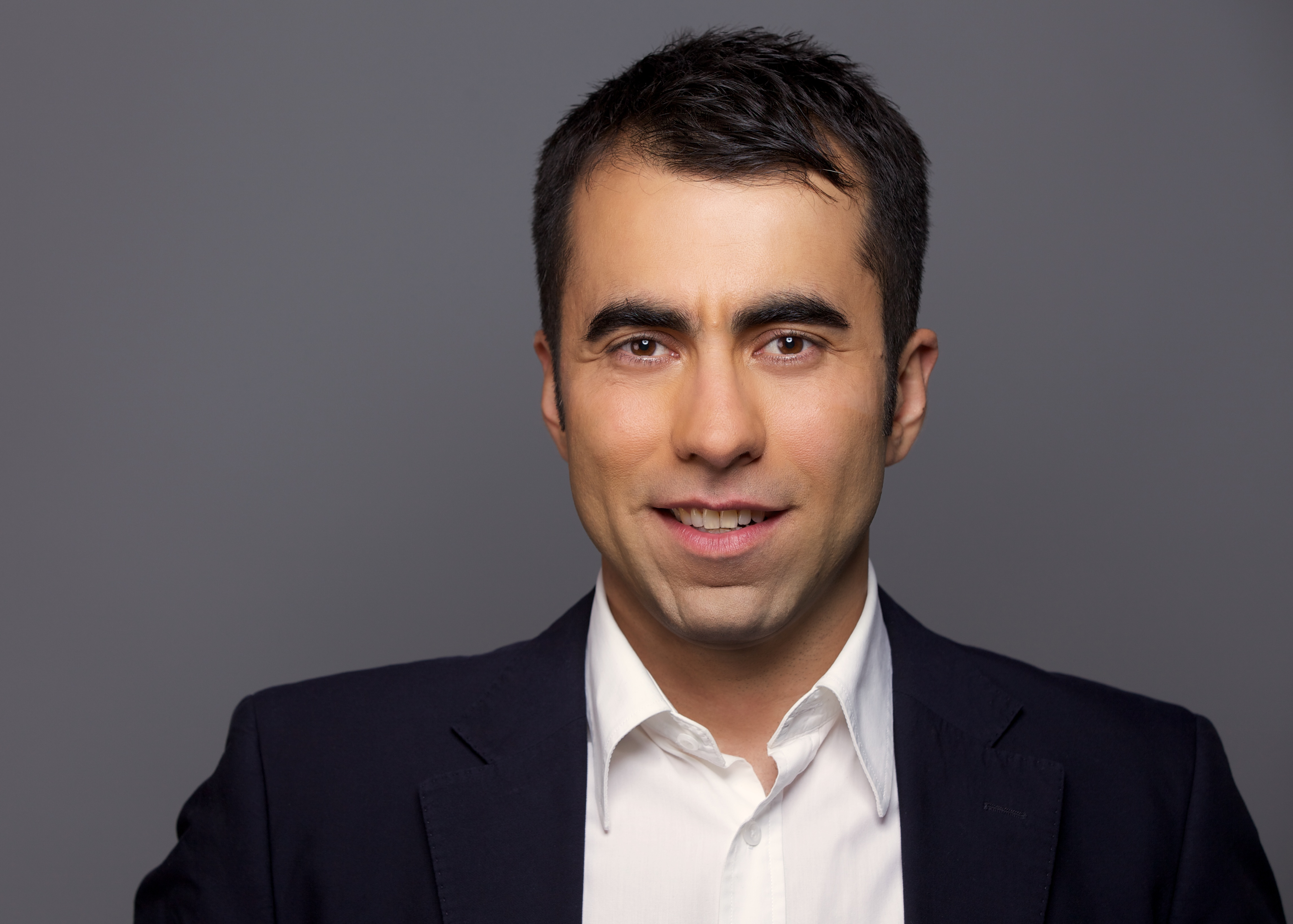
Murat Ham

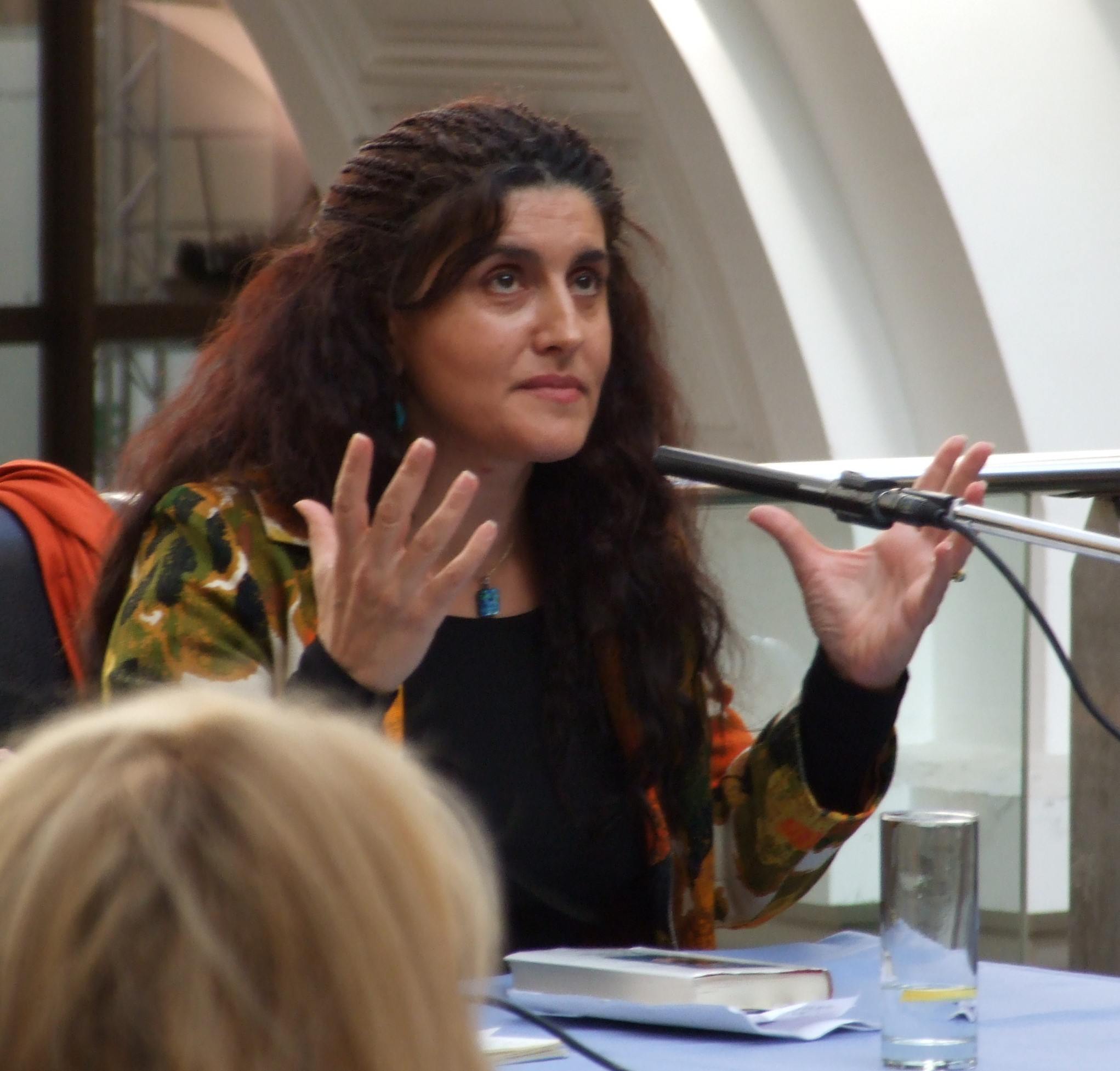
Yadé Kara

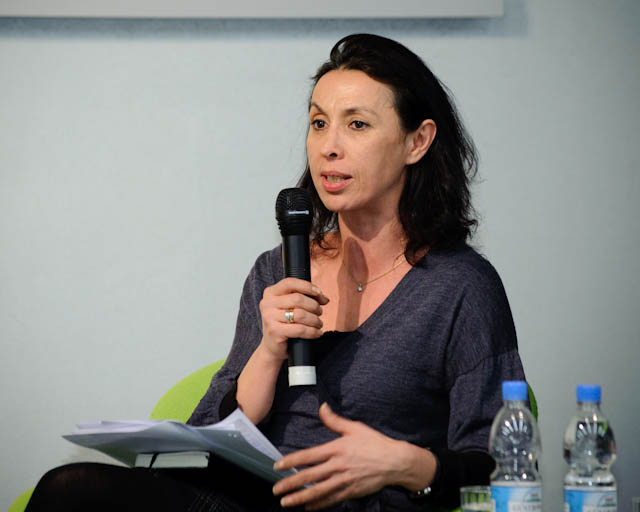
Şermin Langhoff

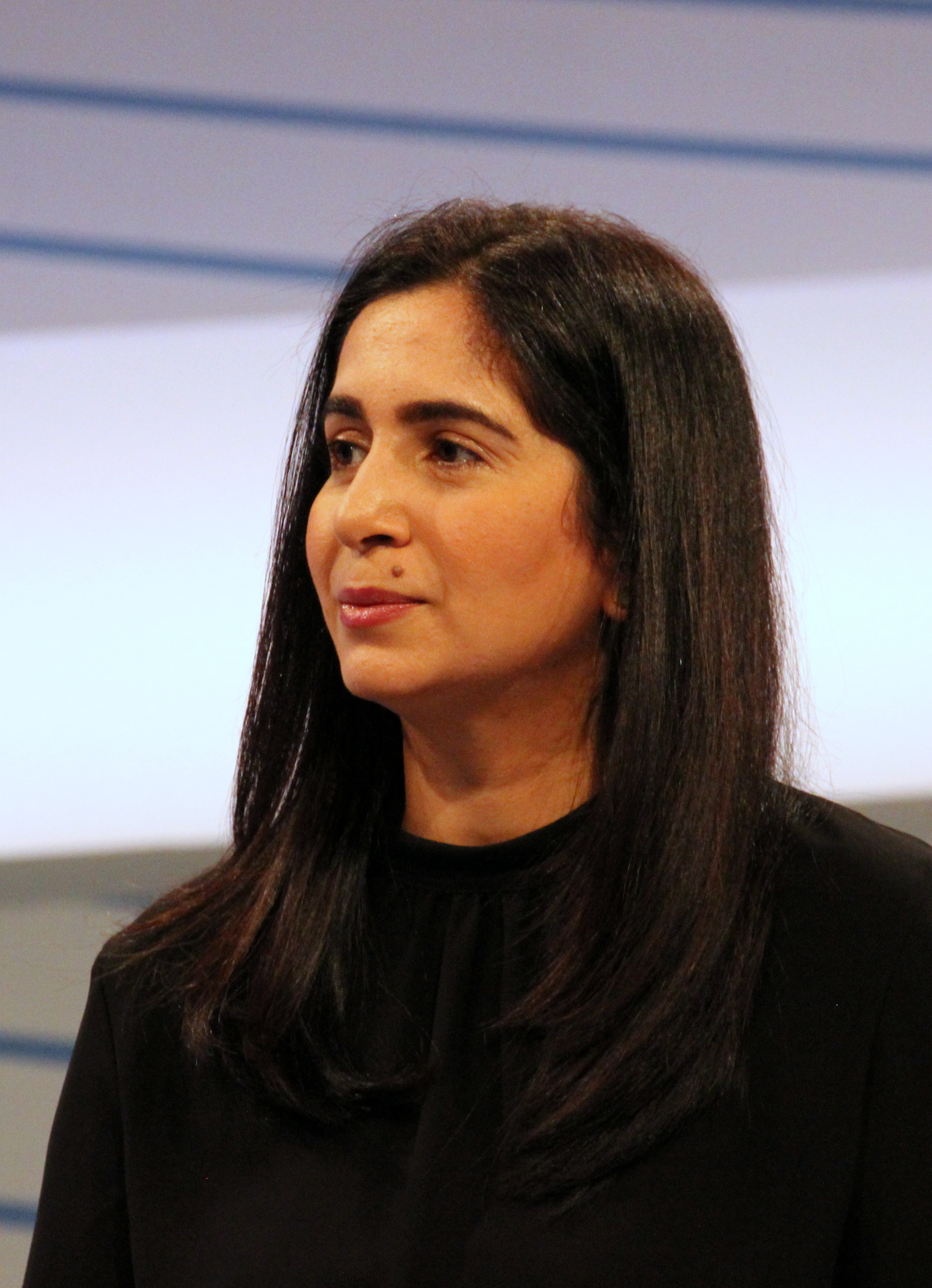
Souad Mekhennet

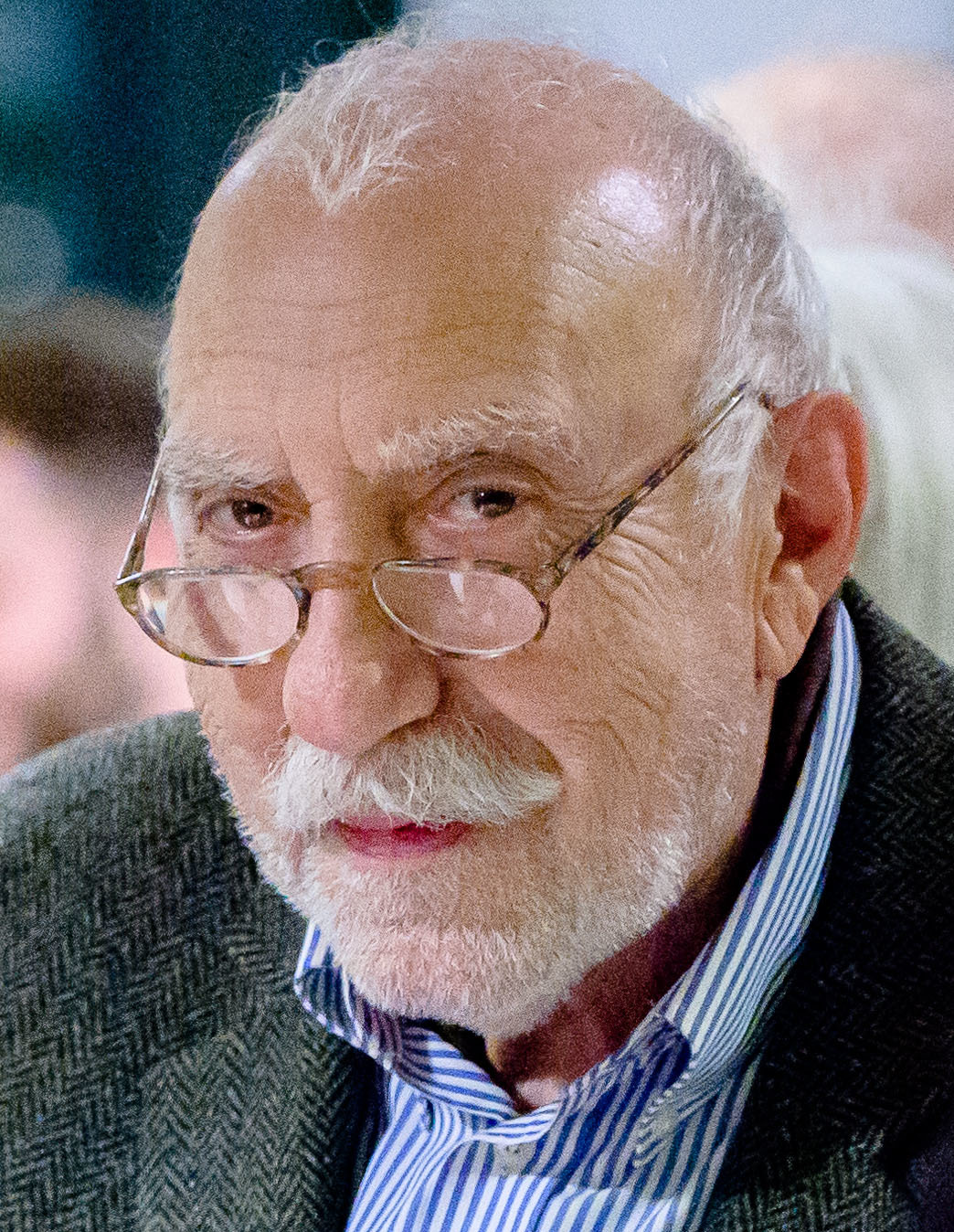
Aras Ören

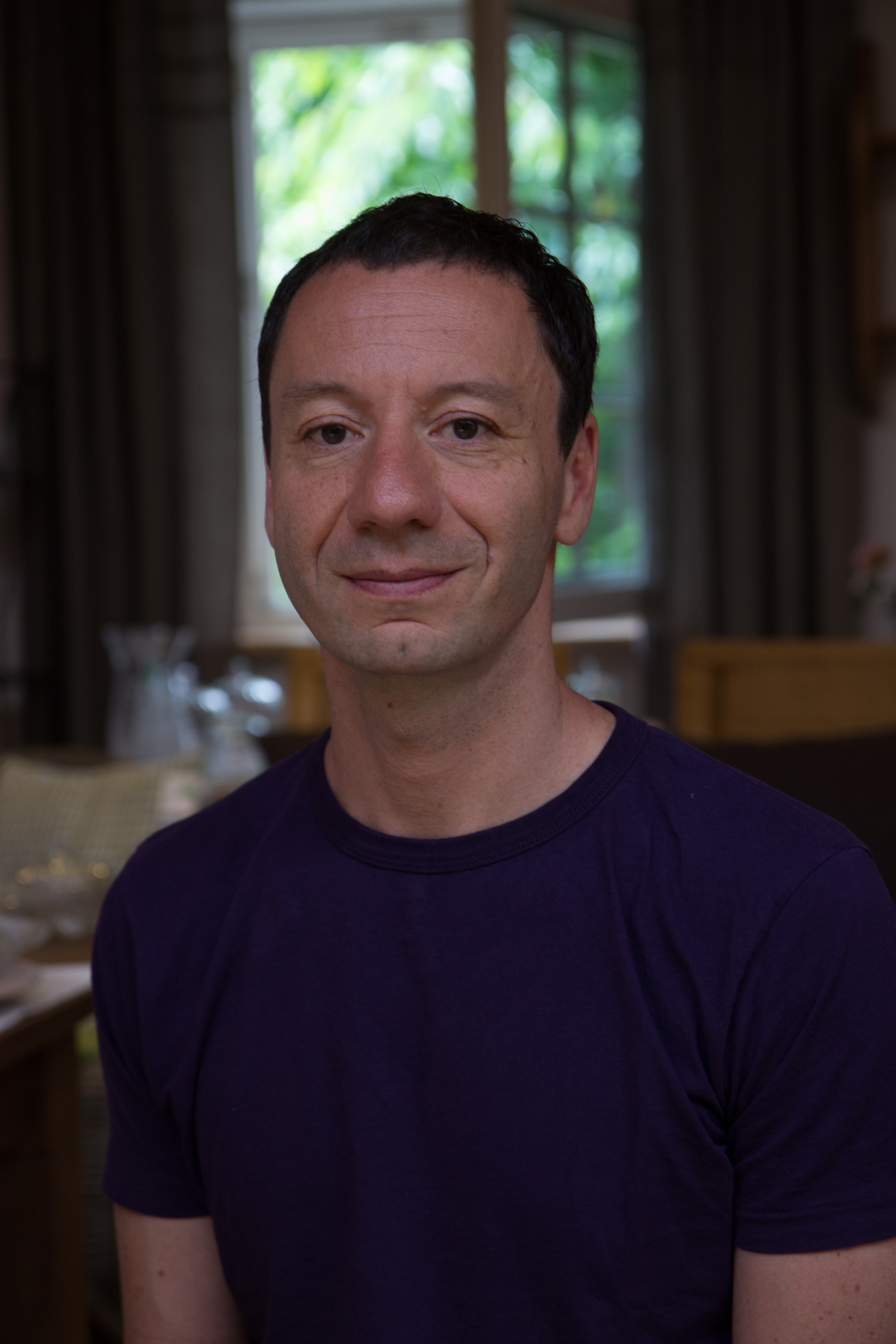
Selim Özdoğan

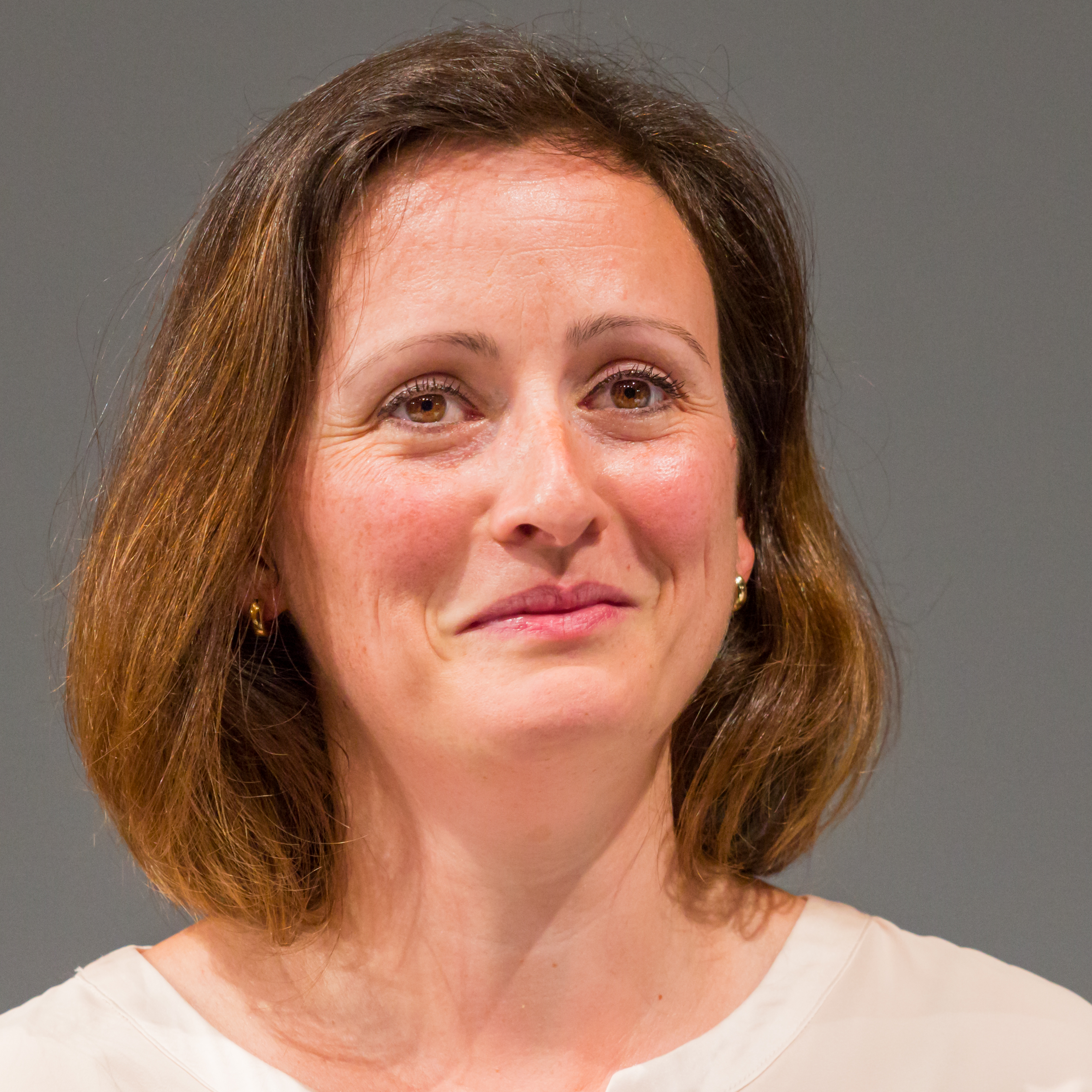
Aslı Sevindim

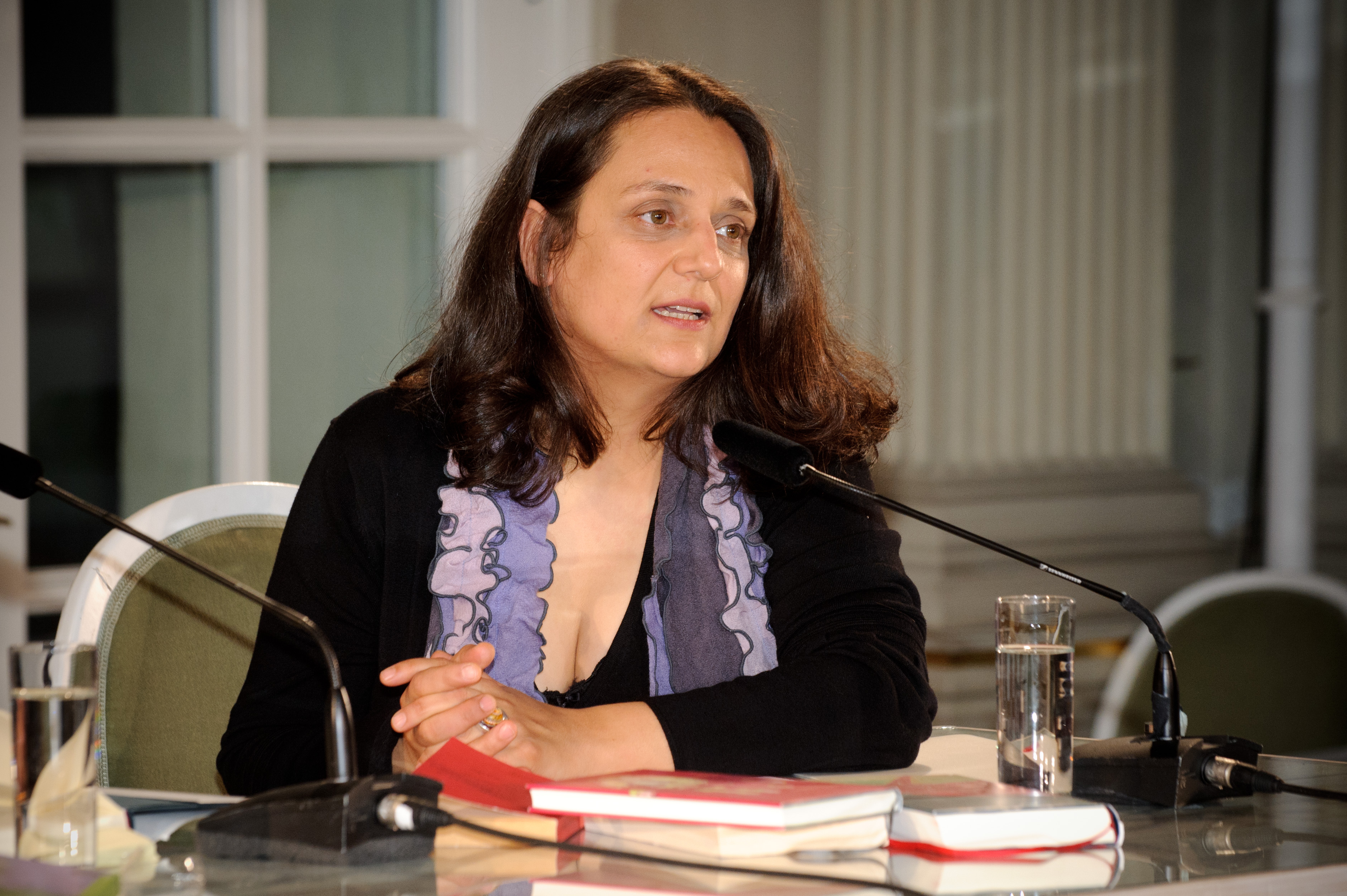
Hilal Sezgin

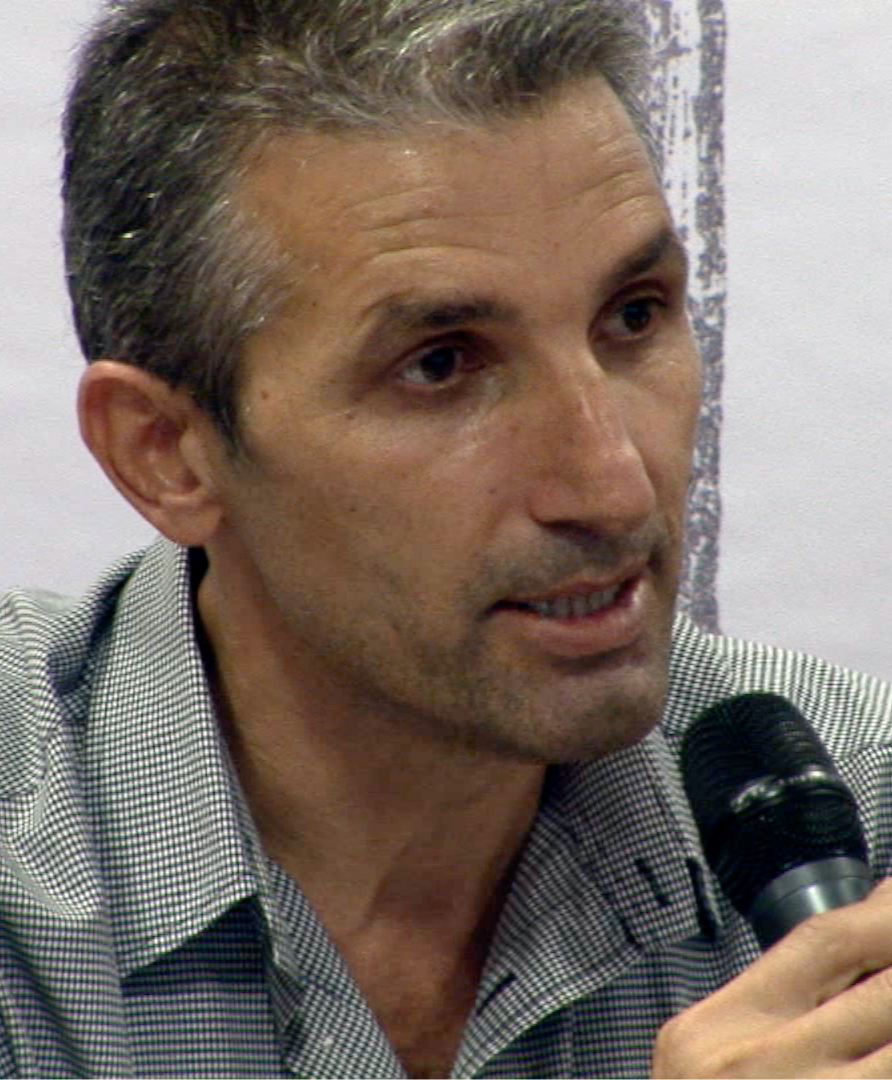
Nedim Şener

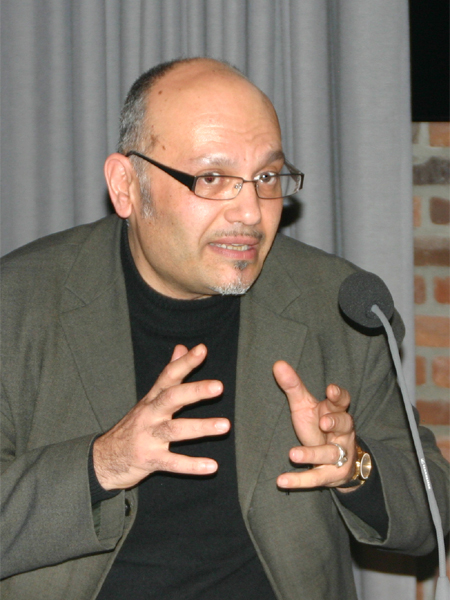
Zafer Şenocak

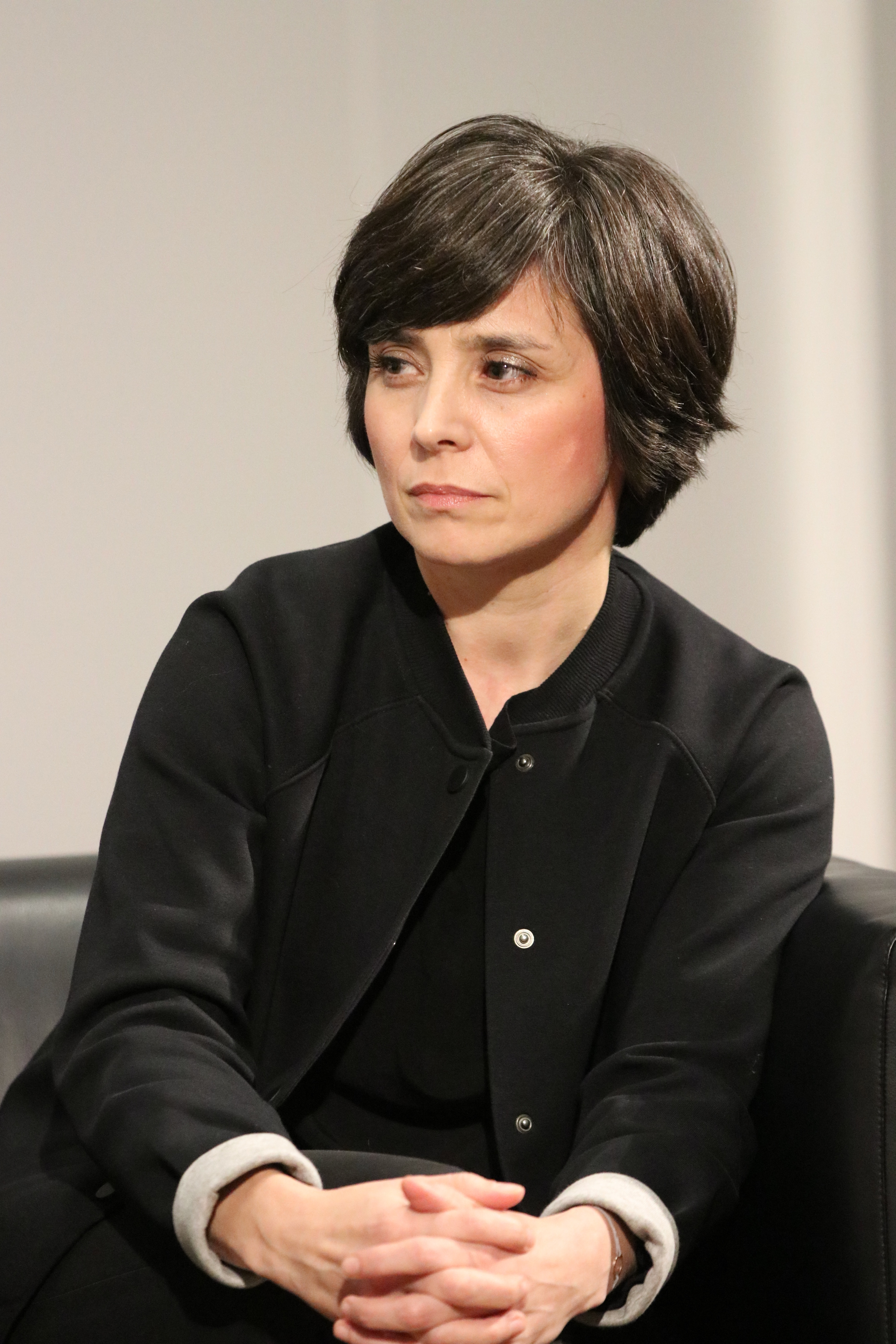
Özlem Topçu

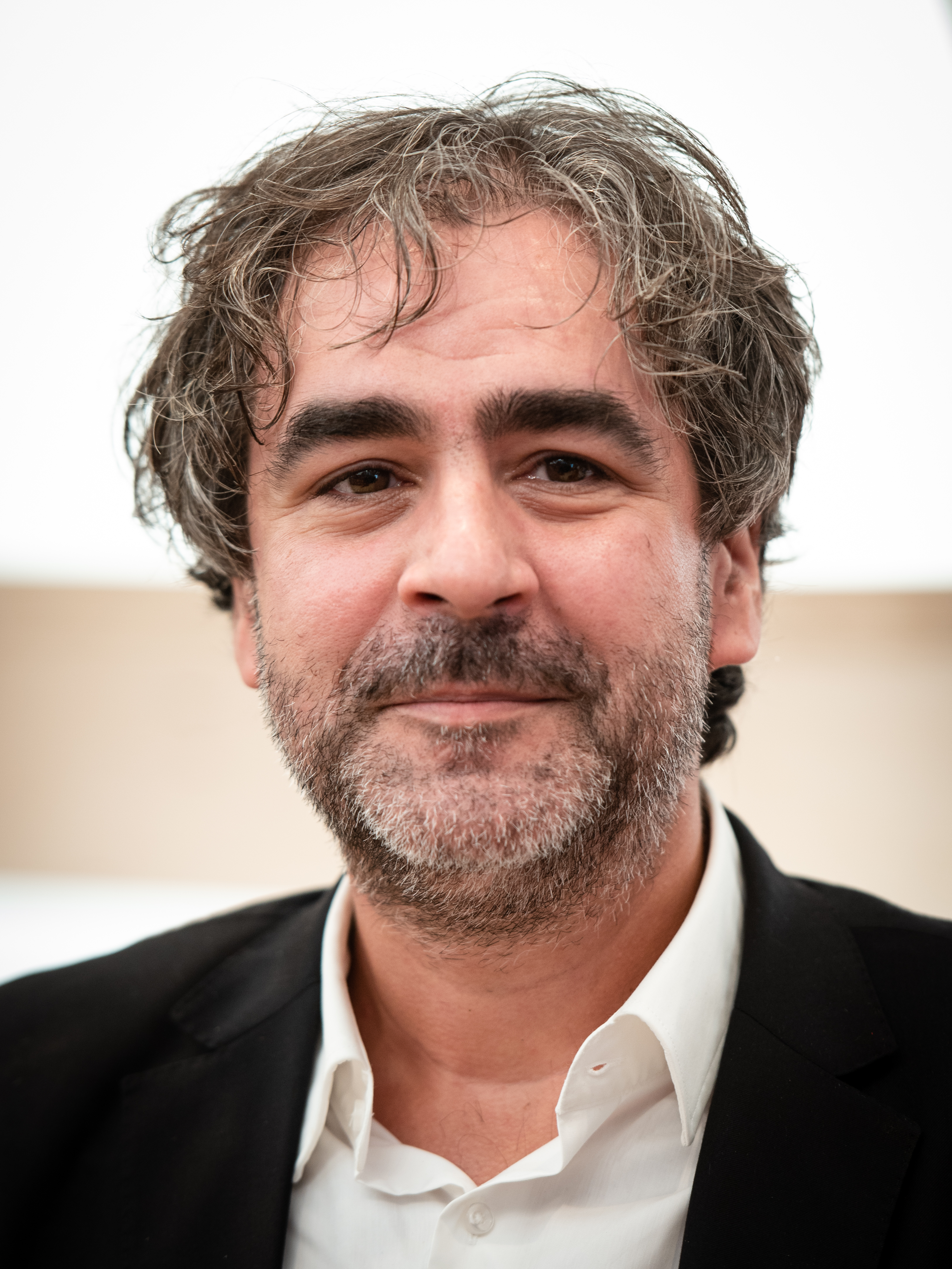
Deniz Yücel

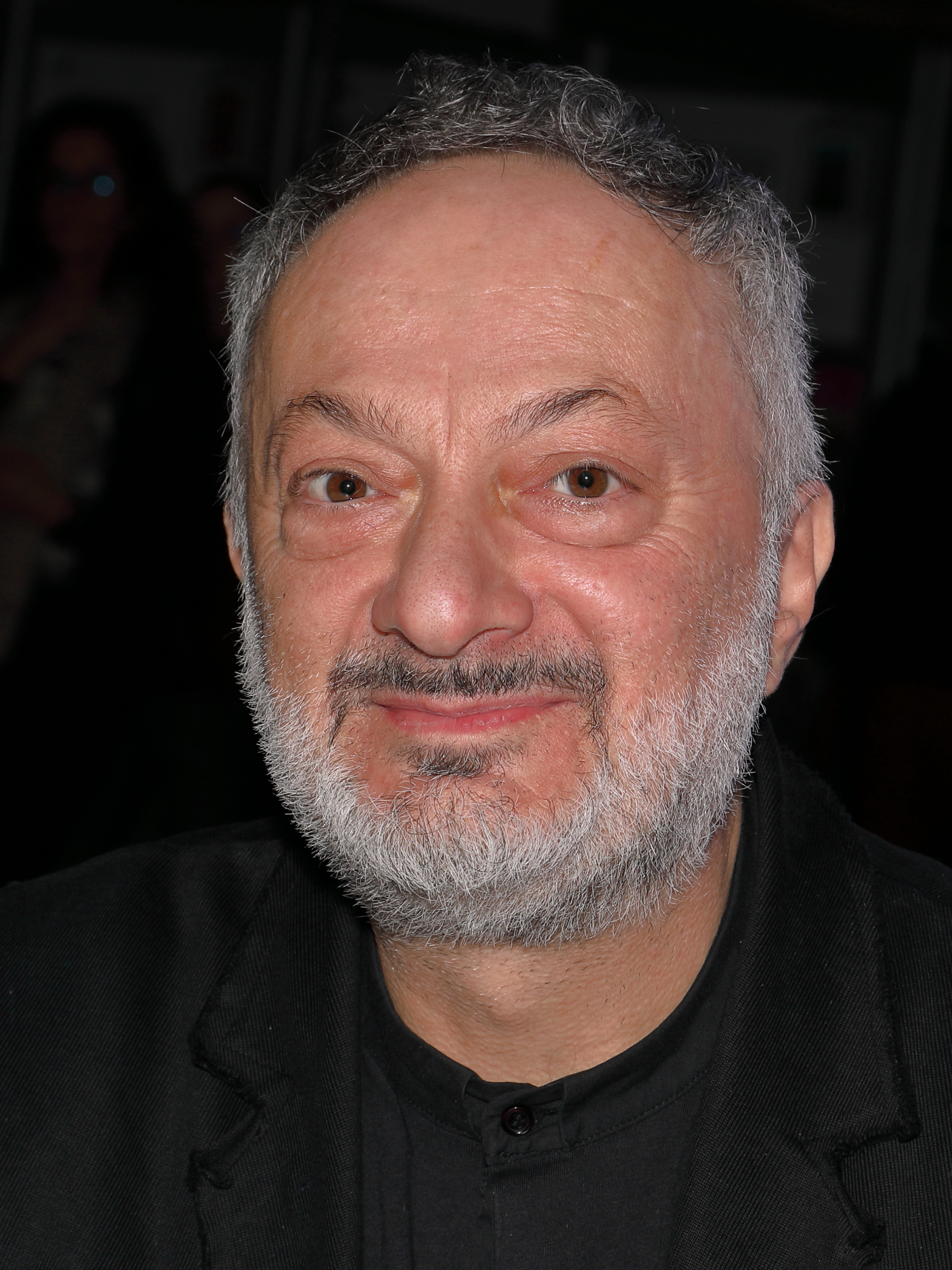
Feridun Zaimoğlu

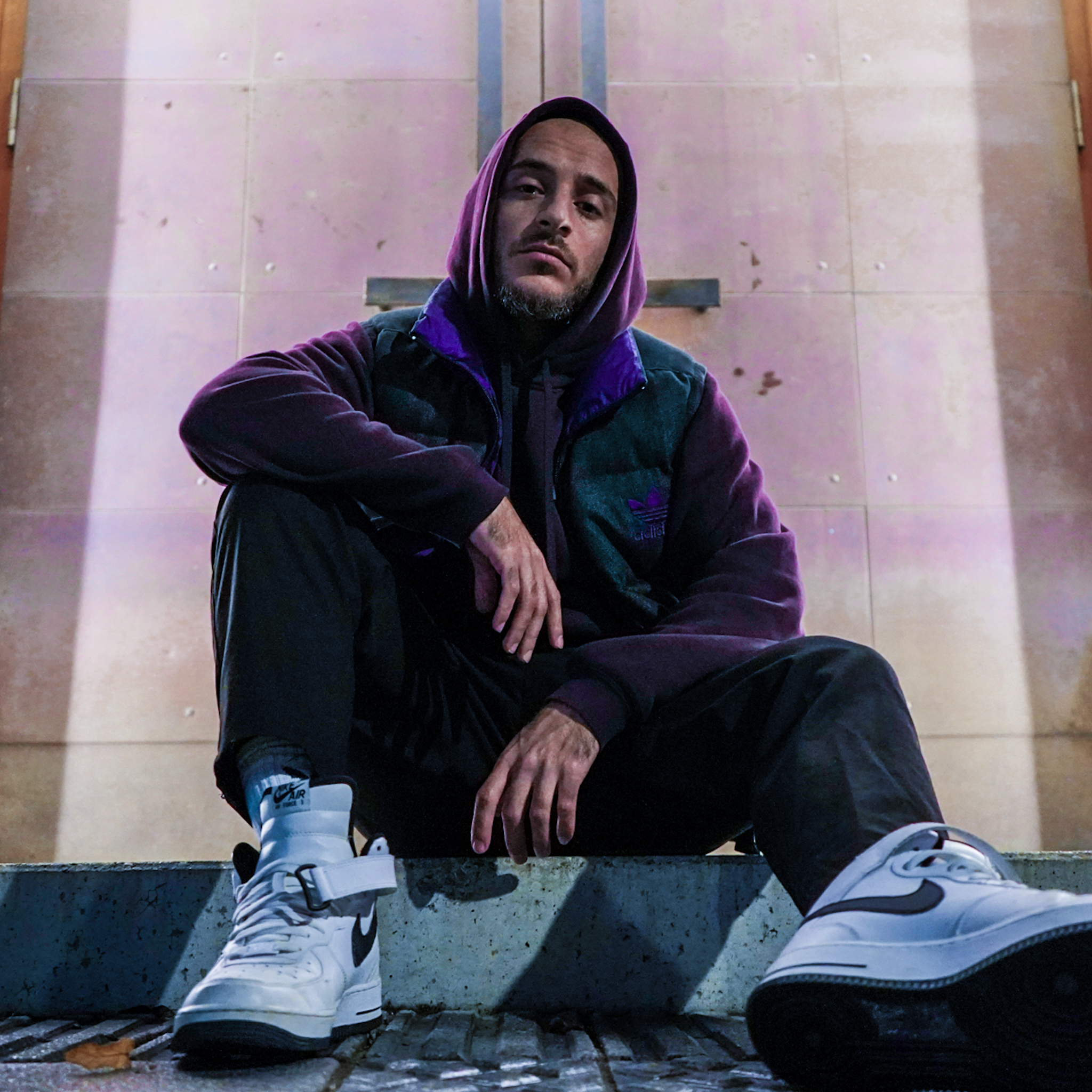
Zaya (dancer)

- İhsan Acar, author
- Ayşegül Acevit, journalist
- Can Açıkgöz, audio book speaker
- Fitnat Ahrens, writer
- Melda Akbaş, author
- Selda Akhan, theater director
- Doğan Akhanlı, historical novelist
- Hatice Aksoy-Woinek, author
- Levent Aktoprak, writer, radio and television journalist
- Hatice Akyün, journalist and writer
- Nevin Aladağ, installation and performance artist
- Iris Alanyalı, journalist and writer
- Hakan Albayrak, journalist and activist
- Ozlem Altin, visual artist
- Fatma Altinok, author and migration policy expert
- Ayşe Arman, journalist and columnist (Turkish father and a German mother)
- Ali Arslan, writer
- Zeki Arslan, artist and painter
- Mevlüt Asar, writer and poet
- Ferda Ataman, journalist
- İlhan Atasoy, cabaret artist, satirist and performing artist
- Fatma Aydemir, author and journalist
- İmran Ayata, author and campaigner; co-founder of Kanak Attak
- Attila Murat Aydın, graffiti artist, breakdancer, and beatboxer
- Semiramis Aydınlık, cartoonist and satirist
- Esmahan Aykol, novelist (Turkish Macedonian/Turkish Bulgarian father and Turkish mother)
- Alparslan Babaoglu-Marx, cabaret artist, book author, and integration activist
- Melek Baklan, author and social worker
- Vehbi Bardakçı, author
- Deniz Baspınar, journalist and author
- Özdemir Başargan, writer
- Fakir Baykurt, author and trade unionist
- Murad Bayraktar, journalist and editor
- Habib Bektaş, writer
- Muammer Bilge, writer
- Şakir Bilgin, writer
- Birand Bingül, journalist
- Hayati Boyacıoğlu, cartoonist, playwright and journalist
- Fuat Bultan, journalist and radio presenter
- Metin Buz, author
- İnci Bürhaniye, co-founder of Binooki Verlag
- Canan Büyrü, journalist
- Ayhan Can, poet
- Canan and Handan Can, early authors on the "Literature of Migrants" in Germany
- Mustafa Cebe, children's book author
- Selma Ceylan, author
- Emell Gök Che, interior designer
- Hasan Cobanli, journalist, author and pilot
- Nevfel Cumart, writer, speaker, literary translator and journalist
- Sabri Çakır, poet
- Ninel Çam, choreographer and interdisciplinary performance artist
- Oğuzhan Çelik, journalist
- Aygen-Sibel Çelik, author of children's and youth literature
- Zehra Çırak, poet
- Ismail Çoban, painter and graphic artist
- Günfer Çölgeçen, writer and theatre actress
- Yıldırım Dağyeli, publisher and literary translator; founder of the Dağyeli Verlag publishing house
- Güney Dal, writer
- Timuçin Davras, poet
- Gülten Dayıoğlu, author of children's and youth literature
- Adil Demirci, journalist
- Fatih Demireli, journalist
- Ahmet Demirhan, architect based in Cologne and Frechen
- Tunç Denizer, theater director, cabaret artist, and author
- Birol Denizeri, author
- Süleyman Deveci, journalist and author
- Fikret Doğan, journalist, translator and author
- Hülya Doğan-Netenjakob, theater director
- Cengiz Doğu, poet and activist
- Betül Durmaz, author
- Özlem Özgül Dündar, author and translator
- Tarek Dzinaj, writer and doctor
- Ihsan Ece, painter and object artist
- Işıl Eğrikavuk, artist
- Gültekin Emre, poet and translator from Russian into Turkish
- Hülya Engin, literary translator
- Osman Engin, satirist
- Erdoğan Ercivan, writer
- Ismail Erel, journalist
- Özgen Ergin, author and social worker
- Ayşe Erkmen, visual artist
- İsmet Ergün, painter and stage designer
- Aslı Erdoğan, writer and author
- Nurkan Erpulat, theater director and author
- Aysun Ertan, author and journalist
- Semra Ertan, writer and activist
- Aytaç Eryılmaz, author; managing board member of the Documentation Center and Museum about Migration in Germany
- Ömer Erzeren, author and journalist
- Metin Fakıoğlu, journalist and poet
- Yücel Feyzioğlu, children's book author
- Mehmet Fıstık, mime artist, director and theatre teacher
- Bahattin Gemici, writer
- Iskender Gider, artist
- Özlem Gezer, journalist
- Dilaver Gök, co-founder and board member of the à la turca theater
- Cem Gülay, author
- Ali Duran Gülçiçek, author
- Mehmet Güler, painter
- Suzan Gülfirat, journalist and publicist
- Kübra Gümüşay, journalist, blogger, and activist
- Cihangir Gümüştürkmen, painter, sculptor, writer, and comedian
- Ümit Güney, editor and literary translator; co-founder of Buntbuch-Verlag publishing house
- Baha Güngör, journalist; former head of the Turkish-language editorial team at Deutsche Welle
- Dilek Güngör, journalist
- Metin Gür, journalist, publicist, and non-fiction author
- Tatjana Gürbaca, opera director (Turkish father and Italian mother)
- Lütfiye Güzel, author and poet
- Murat Ham, journalist
- Mete İzgi, writer and playwright
- Osman Kalin, built the Baumhaus an der Mauer in Berlin
- Celal Kandemiroglu, graphic artist
- Yadé Kara, writer
- Murat Karaaslan, writer
- Immo Karaman, theater director
- Suzan Emine Kaube, writer, painter and pedagogue
- Nazmi Kavasoğlu, writer and publicist
- Ibrahim Kaya, writer
- Murat Kaya, comics author
- Nihat Kesen, comic artist
- Sanem Kleff, non-fiction author
- Ali Köken, puppeteer; master of Karagöz and Hacivat
- Azade Köker, sculptor and painter
- Kemal Kurt, author, translator and photographer (Turkish Bulgarian origin)
- Şeyda Kurt
- Gülbahar Kültür, writer
- Nuray Lale, writer
- Şermin Langhoff, director of the Maxim Gorki Theater
- Betül Licht, author and alternative practitioner in psychotherapy
- Souad Mekhennet, journalist (Turkish mother and Moroccan father)
- Kadir Memiş, dancer and choreographer
- Can Merey, journalist (Turkish father and a German mother)
- Avni Odabaşı, cartoonist
- Deniz Ohde, writer
- Muhsin Omurca, cartoonist and founder of Kabarett Knobi-Bonbon
- Aras Ören, writer
- Celal Özcan, journalist and author
- Emine Sevgi Özdamar, dramatist and playwright
- A. Kadir Özdemir, writer
- Hasan Özdemir (poet), poet
- Selim Özdoğan, writer
- Tuncay Özer, poet and literary translator
- Kayhan Özgenç, journalist and deputy editor-in-chief of Business Insider
- Gönül Özgül, author
- Hülya Özkan, crime writer
- Sami Özkara, novelist and non-fiction writer
- Ertuğrul Özkök, journalist
- Acem Özler, author and translator
- Serpil Pak, cabaret artist
- Kerim Pamuk, writer and cabaret artist
- Sedat Pamuk, cabaret artist
- Yüksel Pazarkaya, writer and translator
- Akif Pirinçci, writer
- Filiz Penzkofer, author, journalist, and theater pedagogue
- Serap Riedel, painter
- Alpan Sagsöz, novelist
- Şener Saltürk, author
- Zadiel Sasmaz, dancer
- Fethi Savaşçı, writer
- Saliha Scheinhardt, writer
- Tülay Sözbir-Seidel,
- Deniz Selek, writer
- Evrim Sen, author
- Gök Senin, journalist and author
- Tamer Serbay, visual artist
- Aslı Sevindim, journalist, radio presenter and writer
- Mehmet Ilhami Sezen, artist and author
- Murad Sezer, photographer
- Hilal Sezgin, writer, publicist and journalist (Turkish father and German mother)
- Zuhal Soyhan, journalist
- Necmi Sönmez, curator, art critic and writer
- Nedim Sönmez, artist
- Tekin Sönmez, writer and publicist
- Asli Sungu, performance artist and painter
- Sefa İnci Suvak, journalist, author, and editor
- Necati Şahin, theater director; founder of Arkadaş Theater
- Cemil Şahinöz, editor-in-chief of the magazine "Ayasofya"
- Nedim Şener, writer and journalist
- Zafer Şenocak, writer, translator, and poet
- Semiya Şimşek, author; winner of the Olympe-de-Gouges-Preis in 2013
- Leyla Taşdelen, poet
- Nilgün Taşman, writer and theater director
- Kamil Taylan, journalist and crime writer
- Mehmet Tekerek, author
- Sibel Susann Teoman, writer (Turkish mother and German father)
- Ergün Tepecik, writer, theater director and satirist
- Arzu Toker, writer, journalist, publicist and translator
- Dergin Tokmak, dancer and acrobat
- Canan Topçu, writer
- Özlem Topçu, journalist
- Bülent Tulay
- Enver Tuncer, journalist and radio presenter
- Murat Türemiş, photojournalist
- Özgür Uludağ, journalist
- Şadi Üçüncü, writer
- Meray Ülgen, theater director and cartoonist
- Hüdai Ülker, writer (Turkish Macedonian origin)
- Halit Ünal, writer
- Mehmet Ünal, journalist and photographer
- Selma Wels, co-founder of Binooki Verlag
- Atilla Yakut, non-fiction author
- Kemal Yalçın, writer
- Nevzat Yalçın, writer (Turkish Cypriot origin)
- Murat Yeginer, theatre actor and theatre director
- Vehbi Can Yesil, artistic performer and dancer
- Karin Yeşilada, literary critic
- Erol Yıldırım, writer
- Reyhan Yıldırım, comic artist and comic author
- Bahar Yilmaz, author
- Ethem Yilmaz, author, interpreter, editor and publisher
- Ali Yumuşak, journalist and book author
- Telat Yurtsever, theater director
- Deniz Yücel, journalist and publisher
- Feridun Zaimoğlu, author and visual artist
- Dilek Zaptçıoğlu, journalist
- Zaya (dancer), dancer and choreographer

== "Booty Turks" (Beutetürken) and descendants ==
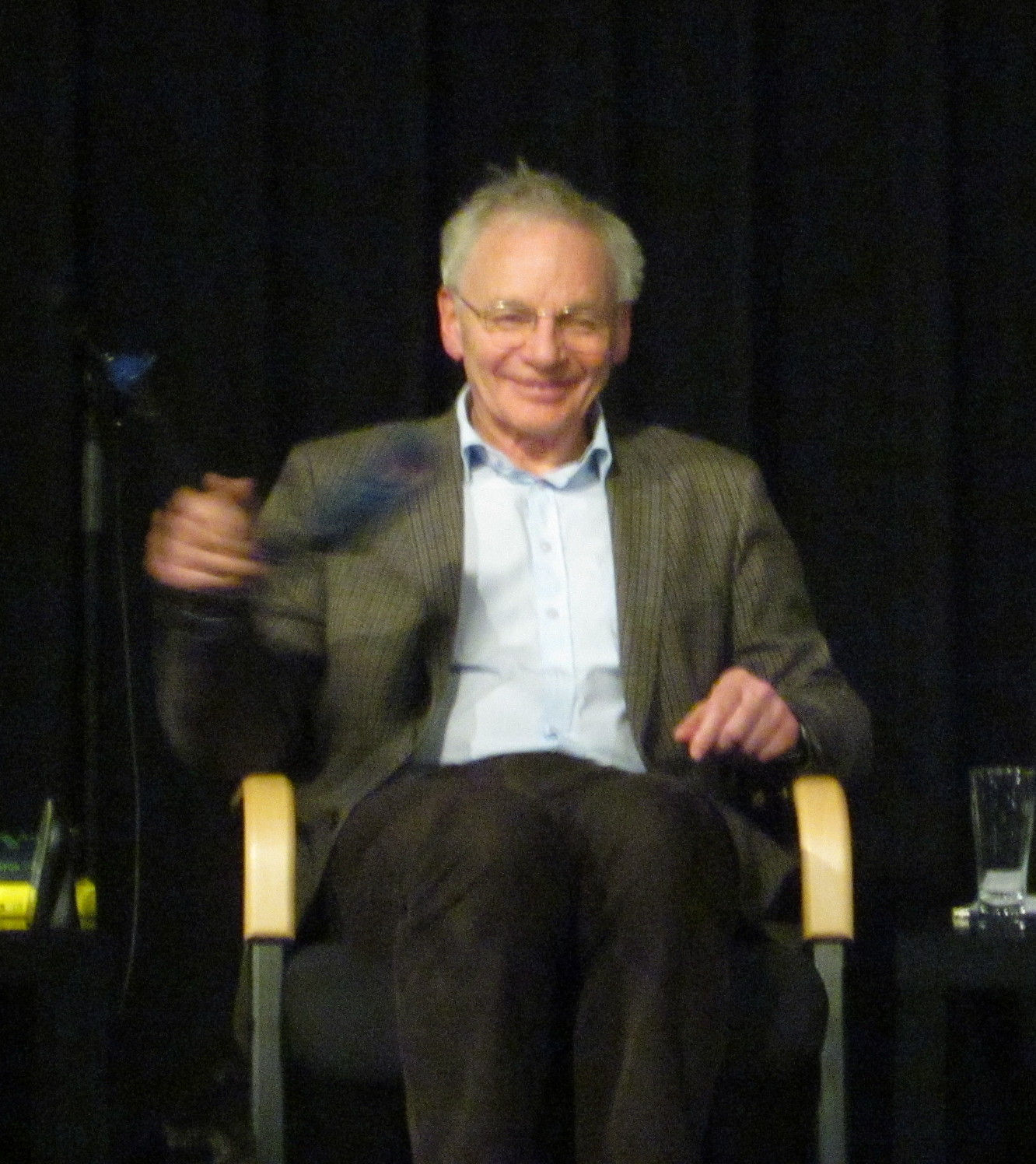
Götz Aly

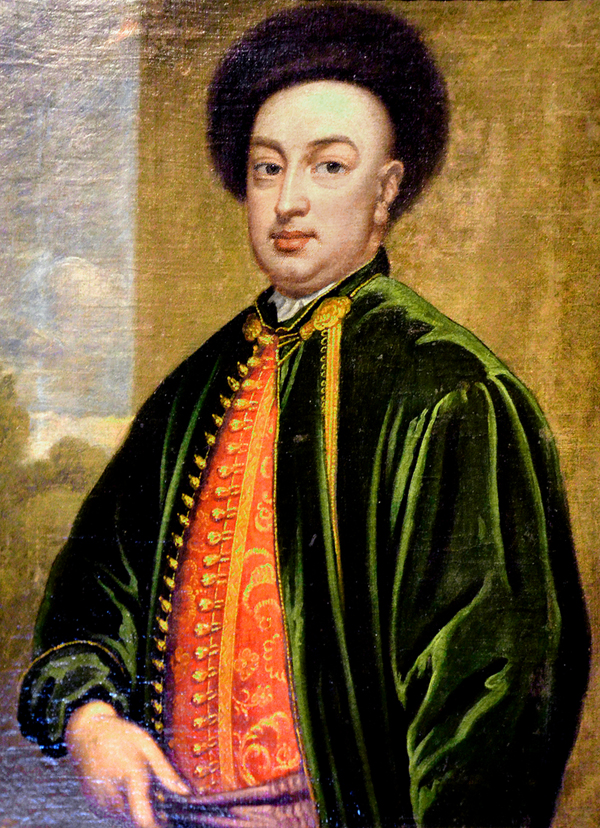
Ludwig Maximilian Mehmet von Königstreu

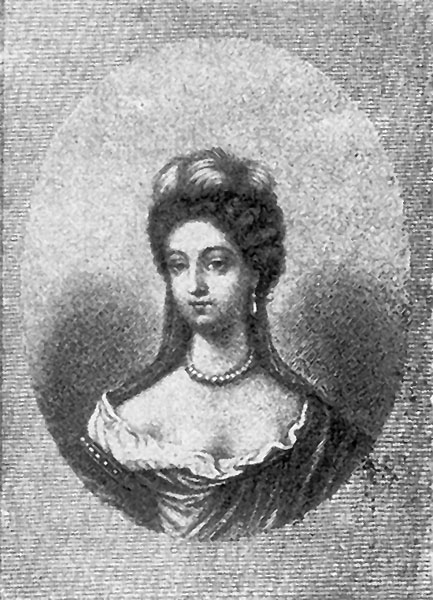
Maria Aurora von Spiegel

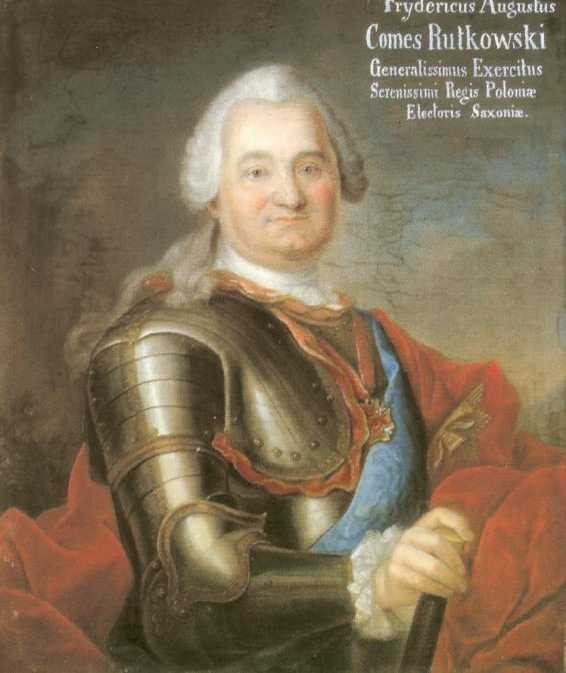
Frederick Augustus Rutowsky

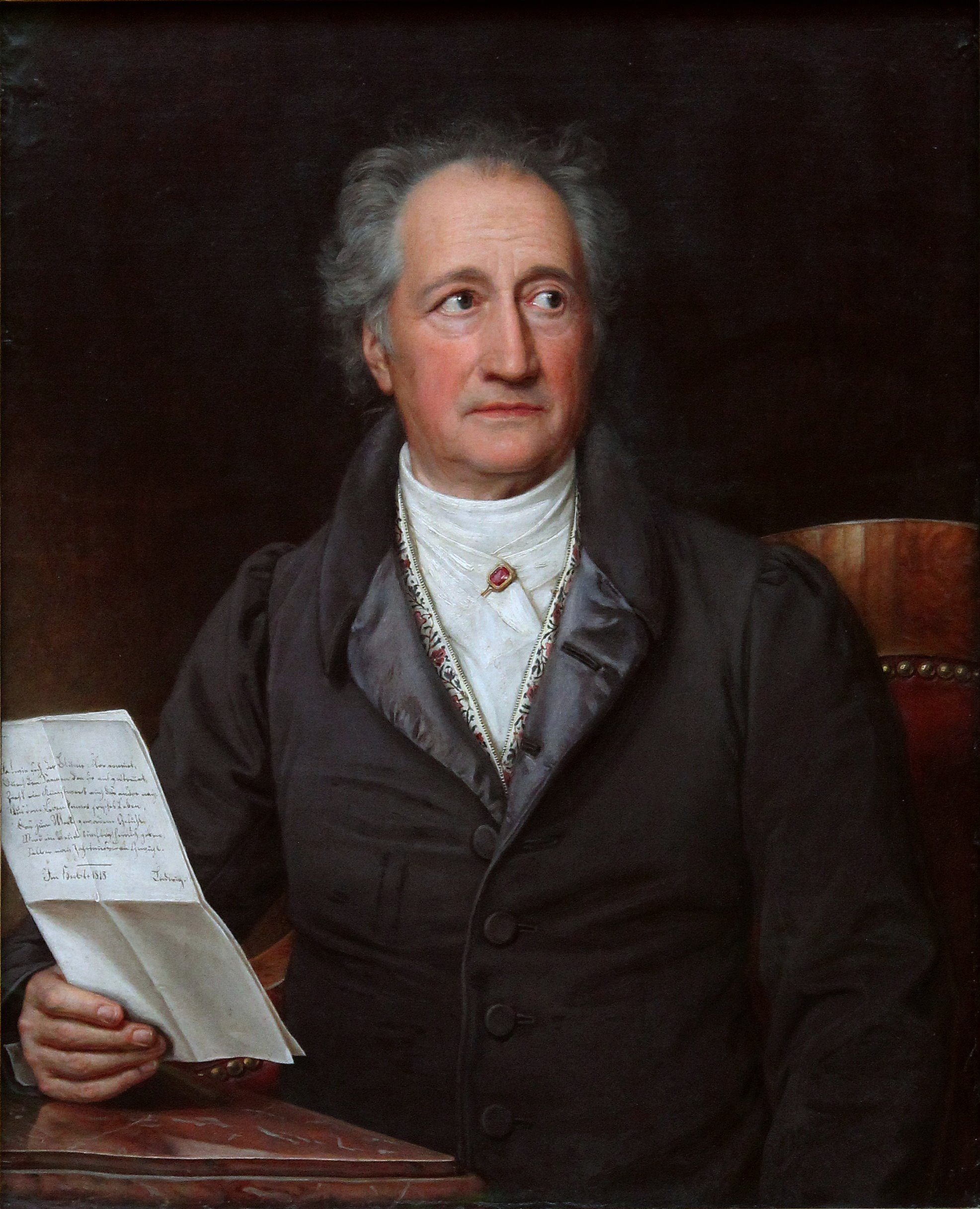
Johann Wolfgang von Goethe

- Leopold Freiherr von Zungaberg, (1641–1706), Baron
- Carl Osman (1655–1735), Rügland
- Friedrich Aly (Haydar Ali) (c. 1664/74 - 1716), Ottoman soldier and kammertürke ("chamber Turk") at the court of Elector Frederick I of Prussia
- Joseph Borgk (Yusuf), converted to Christianity and became a Lutheran pastor in a village near Windsheim
- Augusta Marianna Cölestine Fatme (Fatma) (1664–1755), daughter of an Ottoman pasha; married to Count Friedrich Magnus zu Castell-Remlingen
- Friedrich Wilhelm Hassan, kammertürke ("chamber Turk") of Sophia Charlotte of Hanover
- Hammet and Hasan, captured off Vienna in 1683 and served as "Chamber Turks" for Sophia of Hanover; their graves are the oldest surviving Islamic tombs in Germany dating to 1691
- Sophia Wilhelmina Kayserin (born Rabi or Rabia) (1677–1735), spent her life at the Electoral Saxon court and then as a Protestant pastor's wife
- Ludwig Maximilian Mehmet von Königstreu (ca.1660-1726), Ottoman Turk captured in 1685 and converted to Christianity
- Ernst August Mustafa (1675–1738), valet of Elector Georg Ludwig
- Sadok Seli Soltan (Mehmet Sadık Selim Sultan) (ca.1270-1328), believed to be the first documented Turkish German; he was baptized Christian in 1305
- Maria Aurora von Spiegel (Fatima Kariman) (born before 1685; died after 1725), Ottoman Turkish mistress of Augustus II the Strong
  - children:
  - Frederick Augustus Rutowsky (1702–1764), Saxon Field Marshal
  - Maria Anna Katharina Rutowska (1706–1746), noblewoman
- Johann Ernst Nicolauß Strauss (Mehmet Sadullah Pascha), opened one of the first coffee houses in Germany in 1697 in Würzburg; he was baptized on June 24, 1695

== Business ==
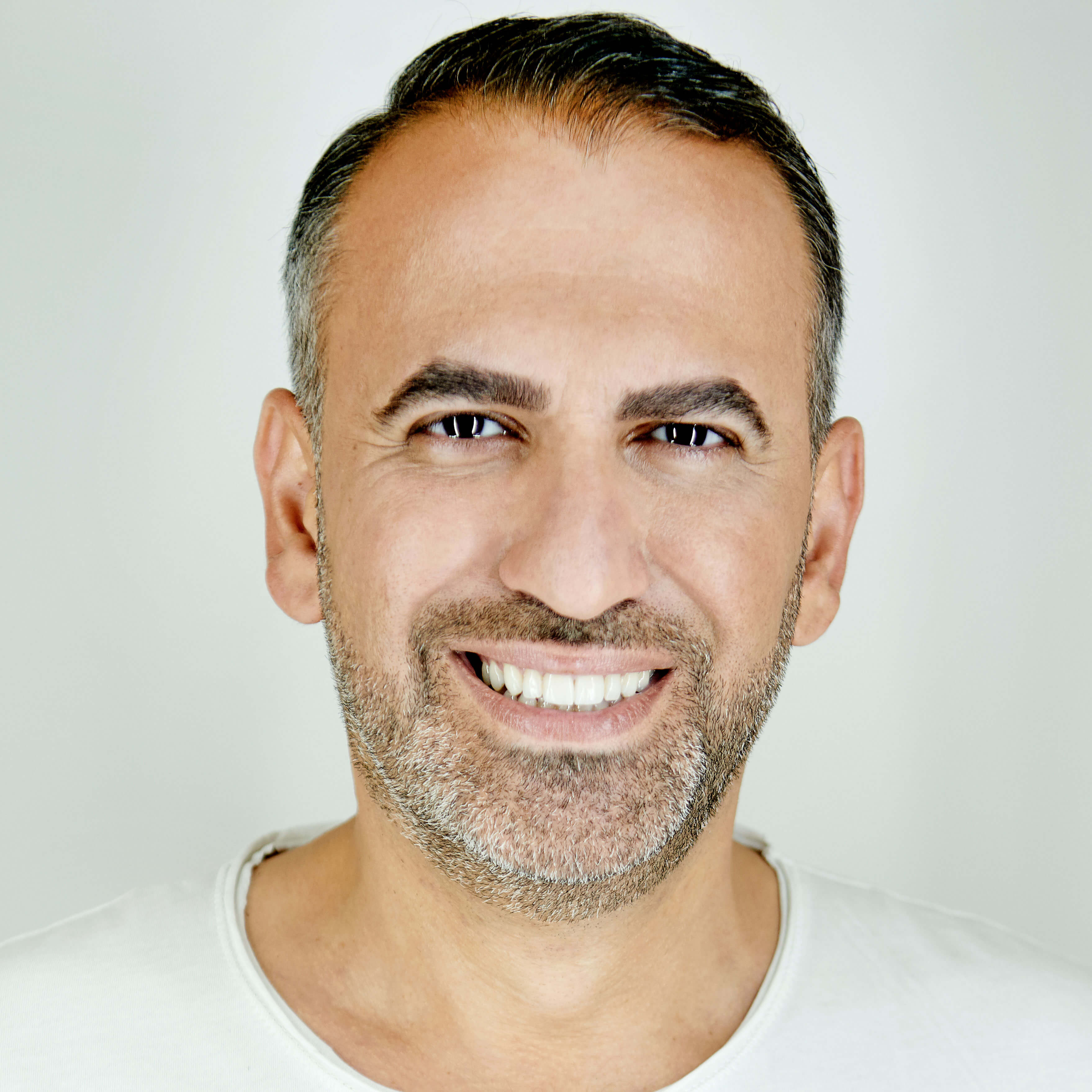
Ibrahim Evsan

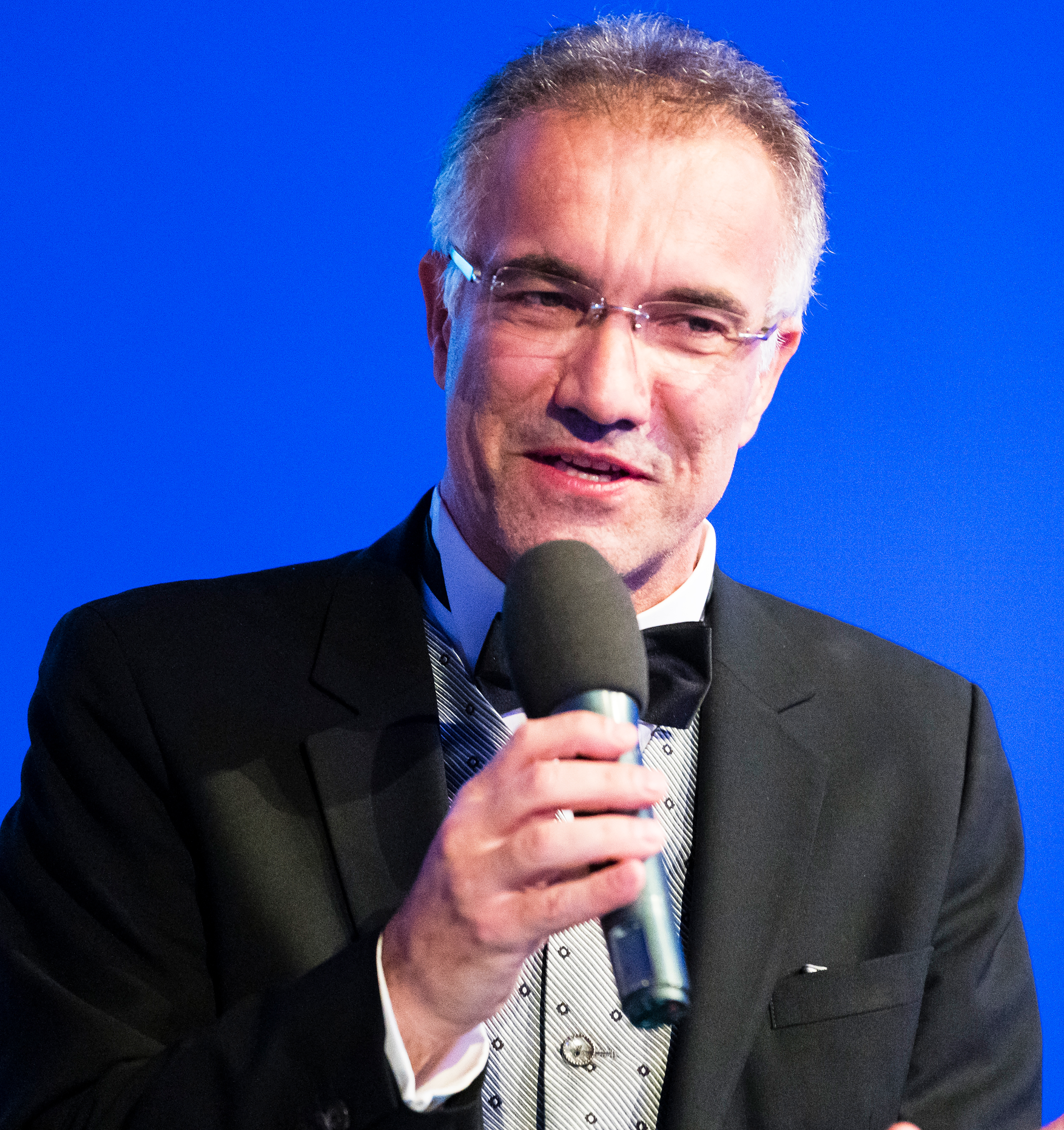
Adil Kaya

- Ali Akbaş, entrepreneur; owner of Kanal Avrupa
- Baklan (family), founders of the Baktat food manufacturing company
- Ozan Capan, entrepreneur and former athlete
- Musa Celik co-founder of the SK Gaming esports clan
- Ibrahim Evsan, entrepreneur; co-founder of Sevenload
- Hüseyin Gelis, CEO of Siemens Turkey
- Mehmet Göker, entrepreneur; founder of MEG AG
- Johannes Sevket Gözalan, founder and director of European Games Group AG and Gründer der Playata GmbH; chairman of Computec Media (2005–09)
- Ahmet Güler, entrepreneur
- Murat Günak, head of the Volkswagen design department (2004–07)
- Remzi Kaplan, entrepreneur
- Adil Kaya, CEO of SIGOS
- Hasan Kivran, entrepreneur; president and main partner of Türkgücü München
- Kadir Nurman, restaurateur
- Tijen Onaran, entrepreneur; CEO of "Global Digital Women"
- Nina Öger, entrepreneur
- Kemal Şahin, entrepreneur and a textile tycoon; founder of Şahinler Holding
- Nihat Sorgeç, entrepreneur
- Erman Tanyıldız, entrepreneur; founder of the SRH Hochschule Berlin
- Saygın Yalçın, entrepreneur
- Şakir Yavuz, business executive and philanthropist.
- Avni Yerli, co-founder of Crytek
- Cevat Yerli, co-founder of Crytek
- Faruk Yerli, co-founder of Crytek
- Oğuz Yılmaz (entrepreneur), entrepreneur

== Cinema and television ==
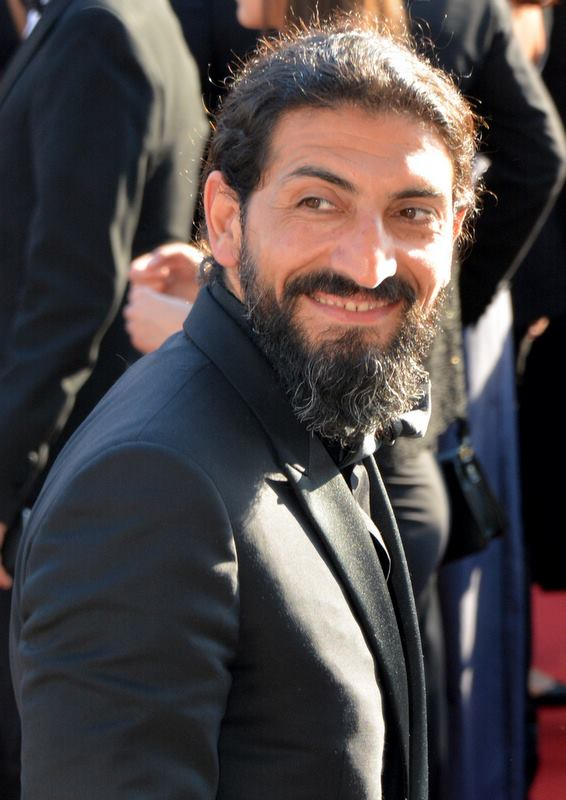
Numan Acar

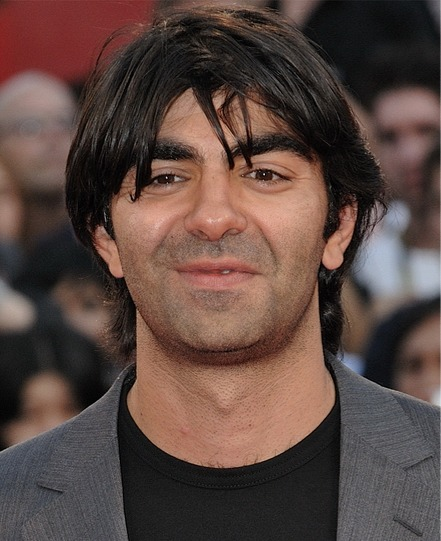
Fatih Akin

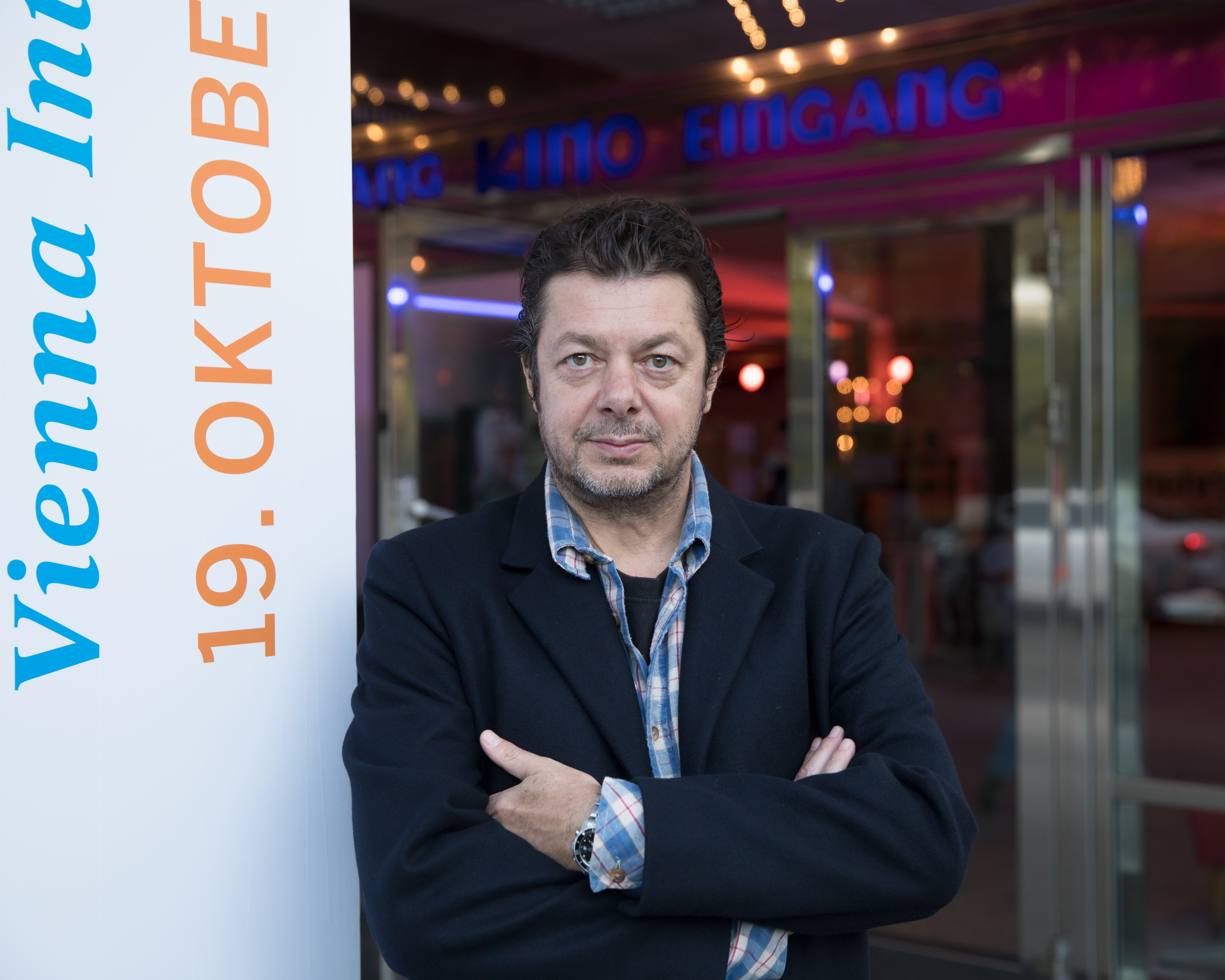
Thomas Arslan

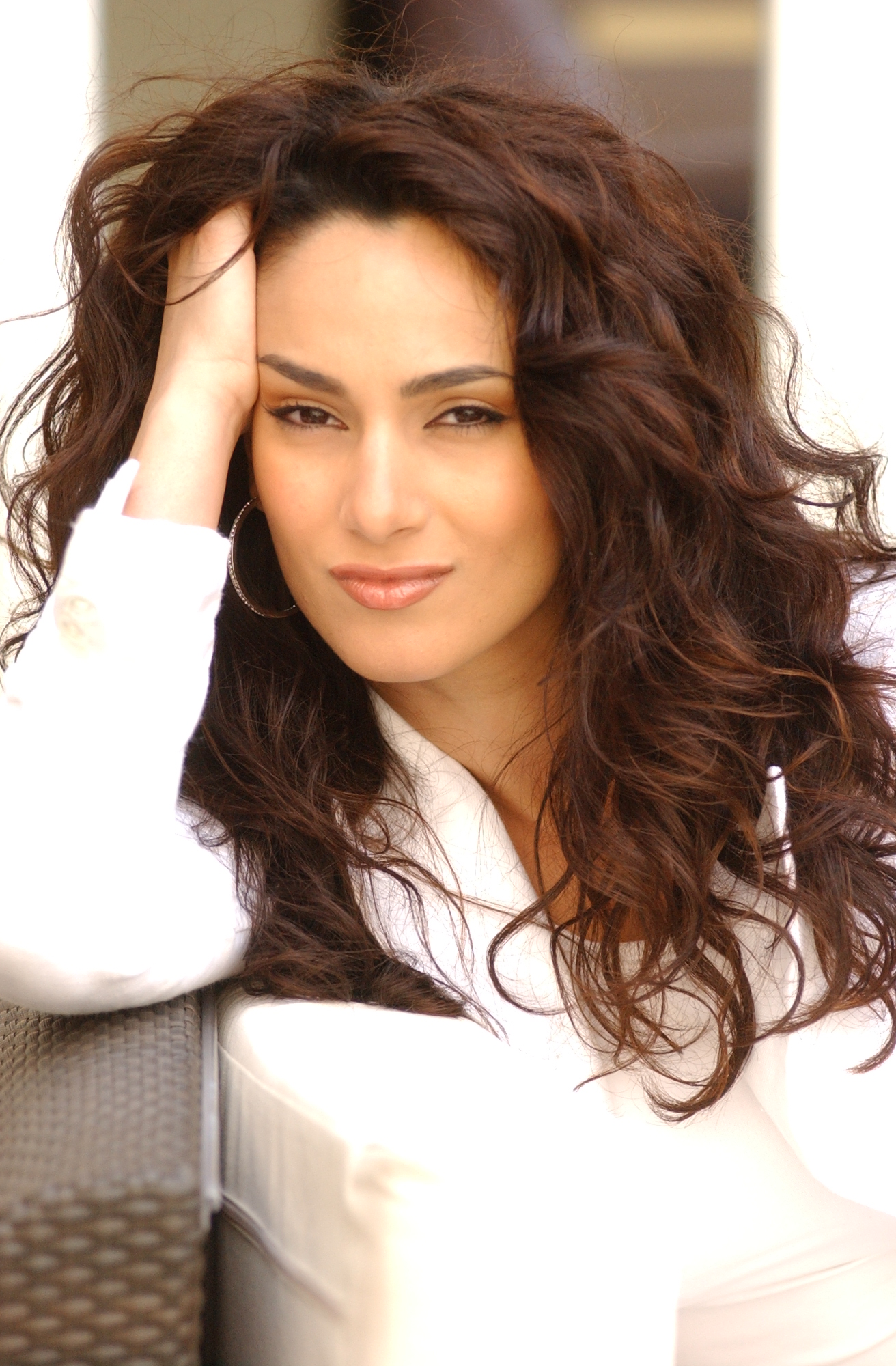
Aslı Bayram

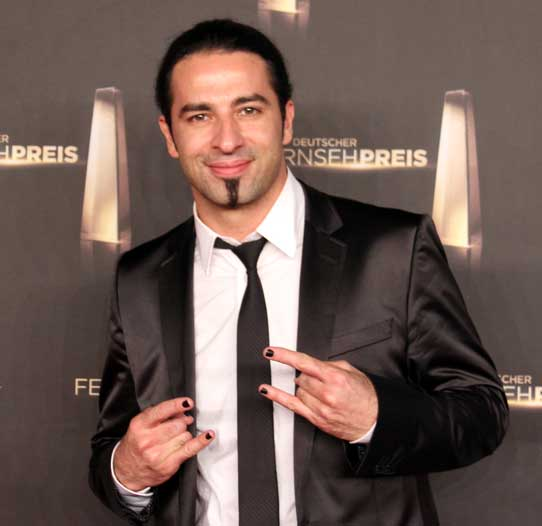
Bülent Ceylan

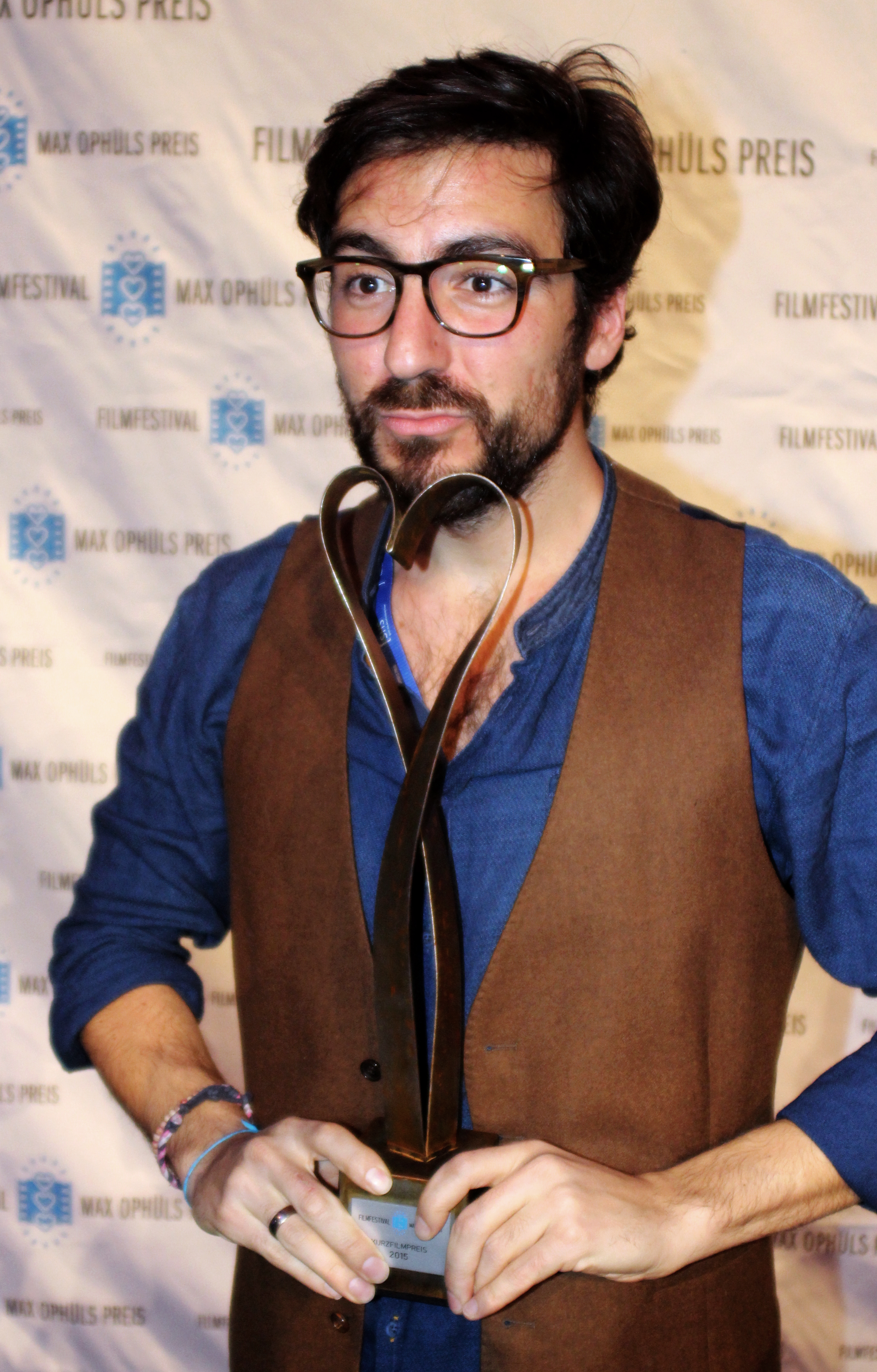
İlker Çatak

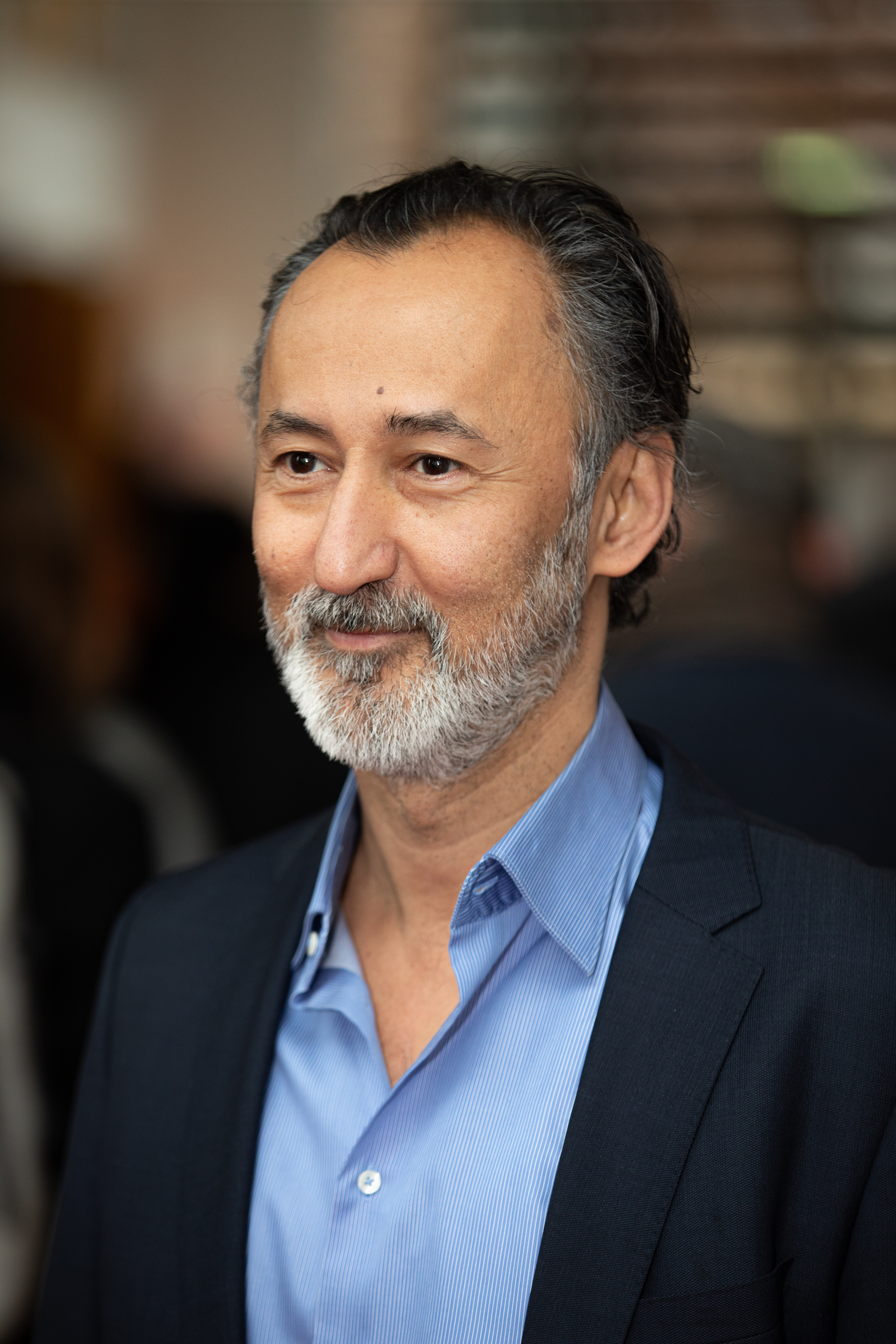
Ercan Durmaz

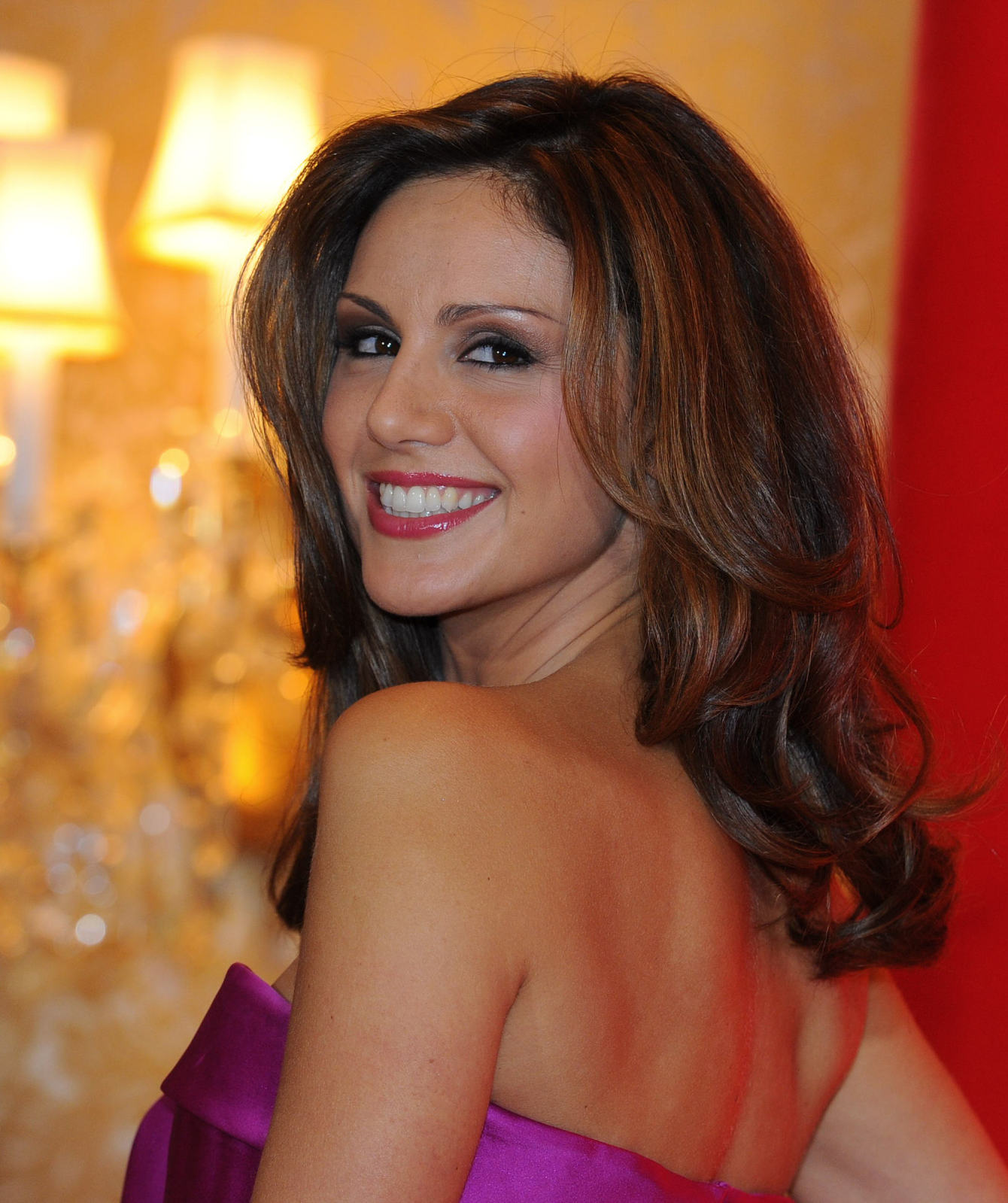
Nazan Eckes

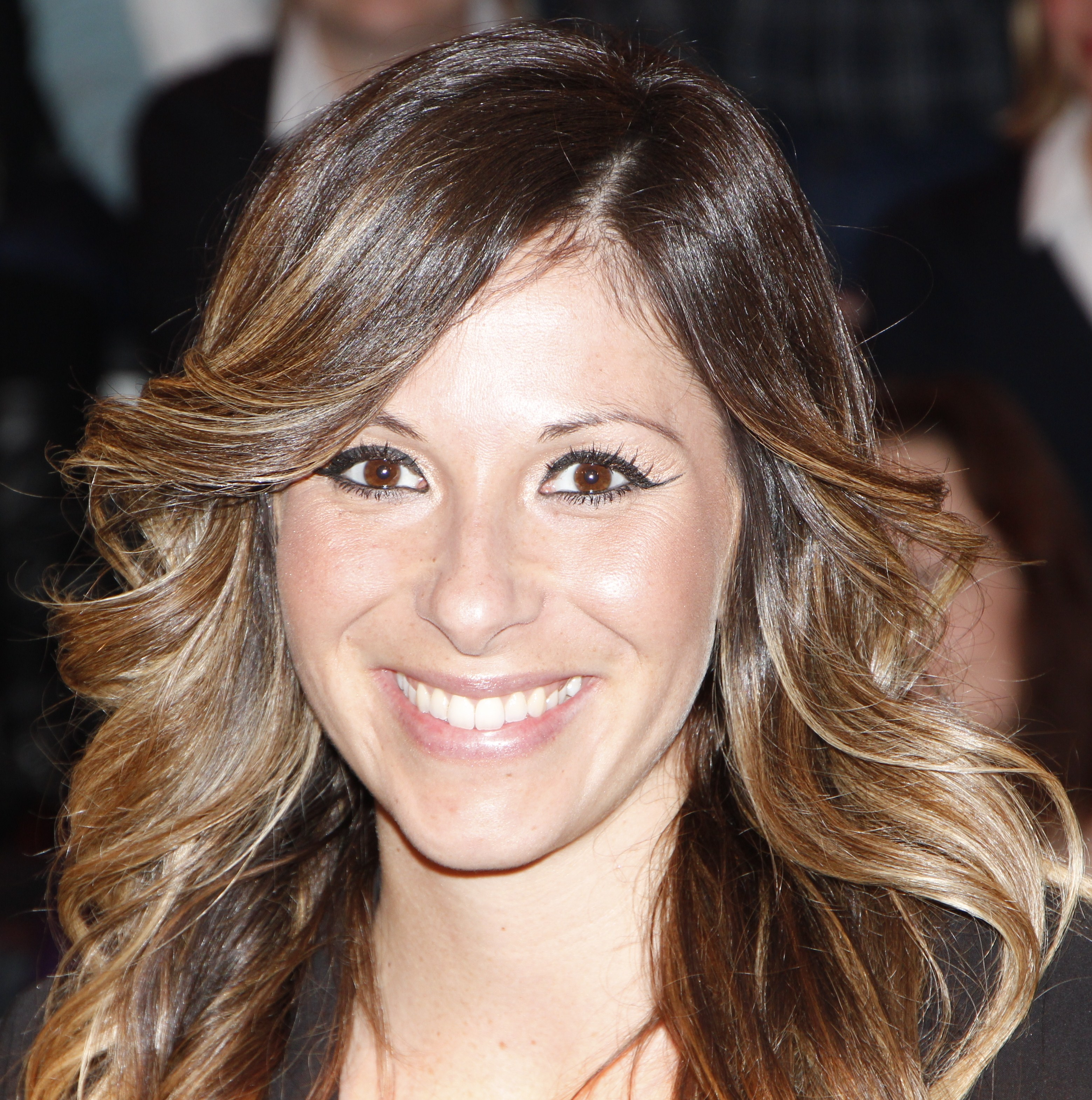
Gülcan Kamps

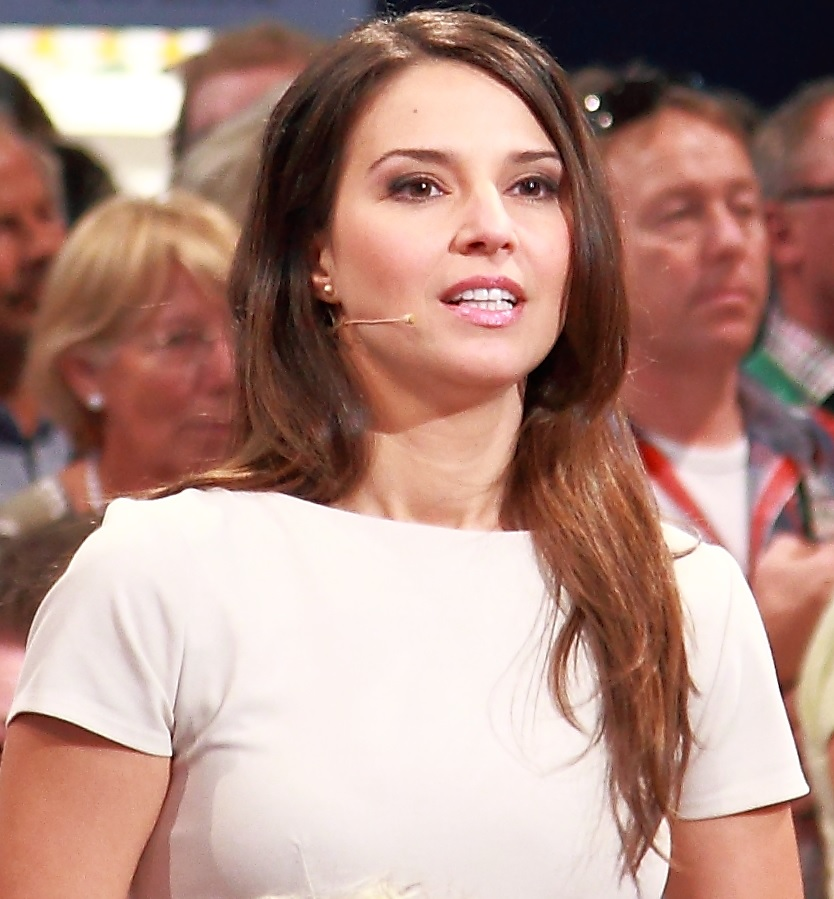
Fatma Mittler-Solak

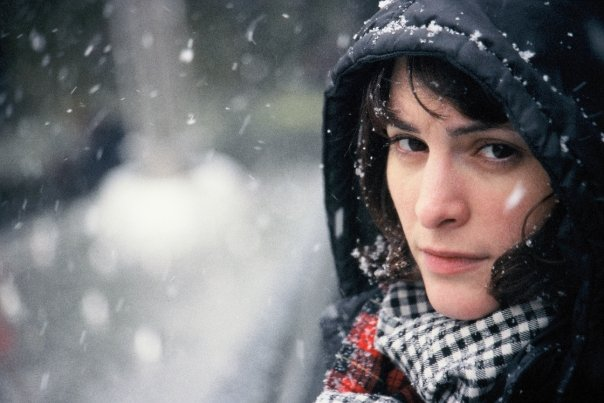
Biene Pilavci

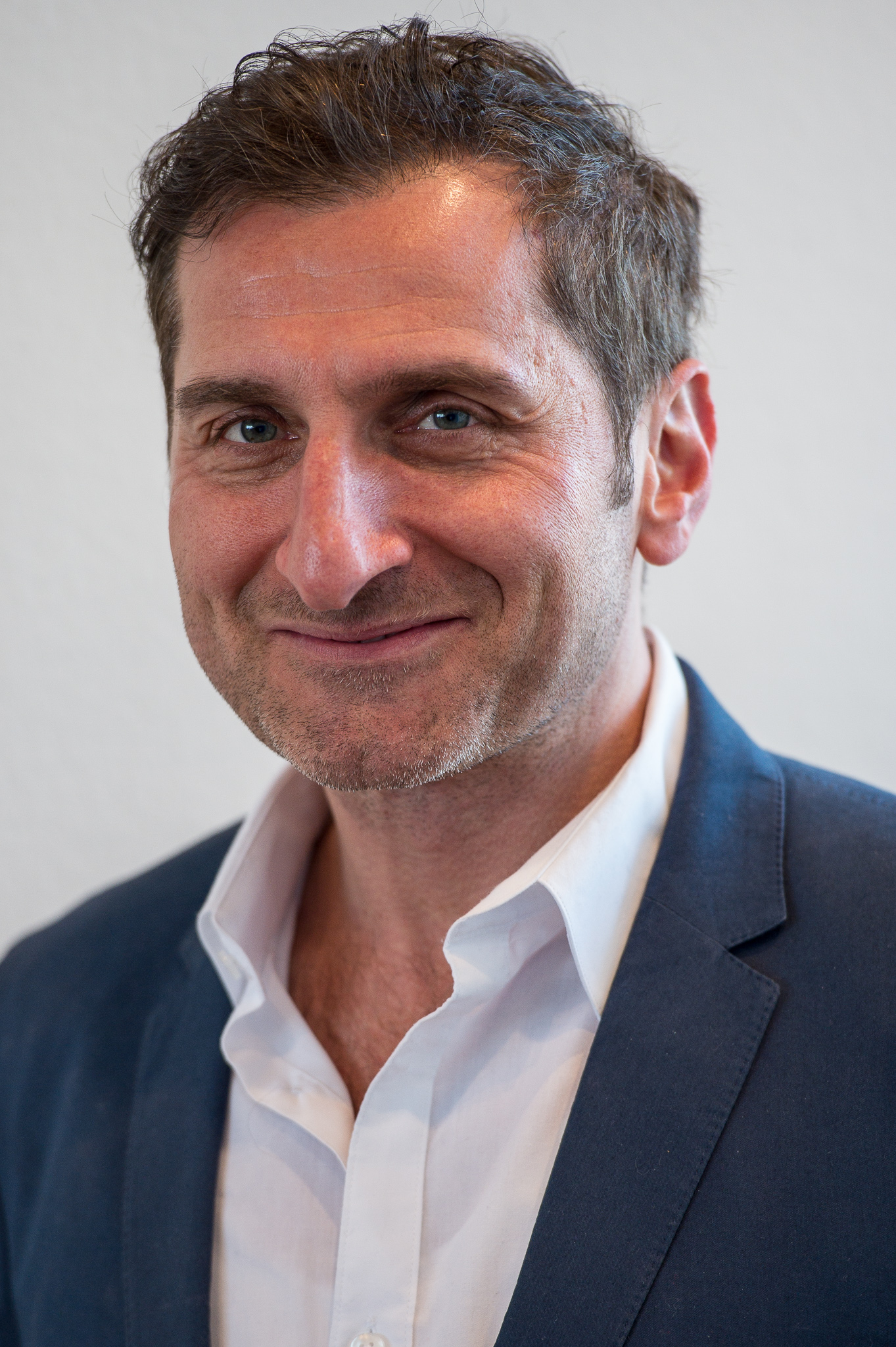
Tim Seyfi

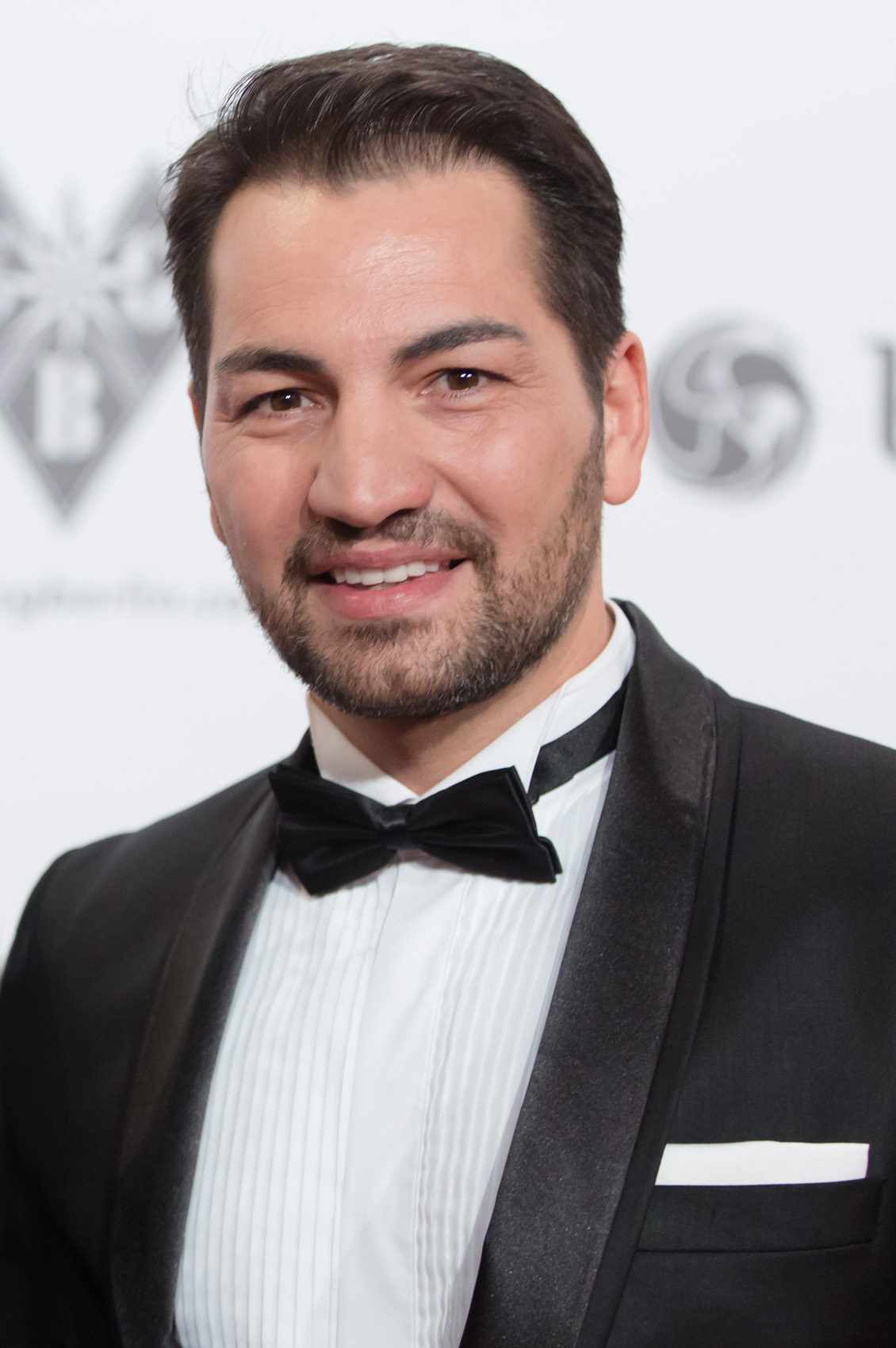
Bülent Sharif

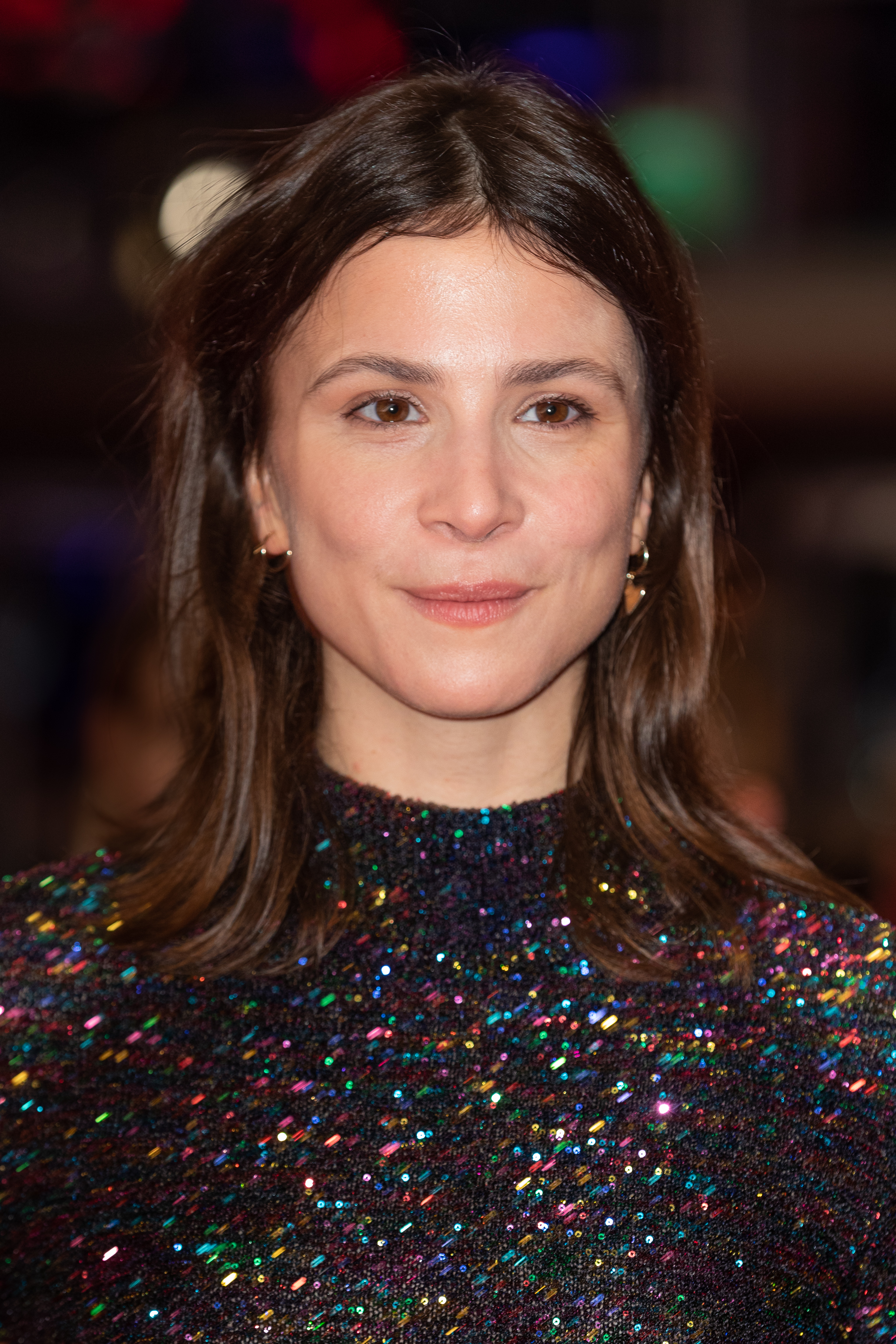
Aylin Tezel

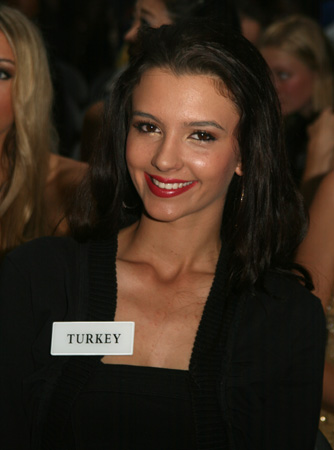
Leyla Lydia Tuğutlu

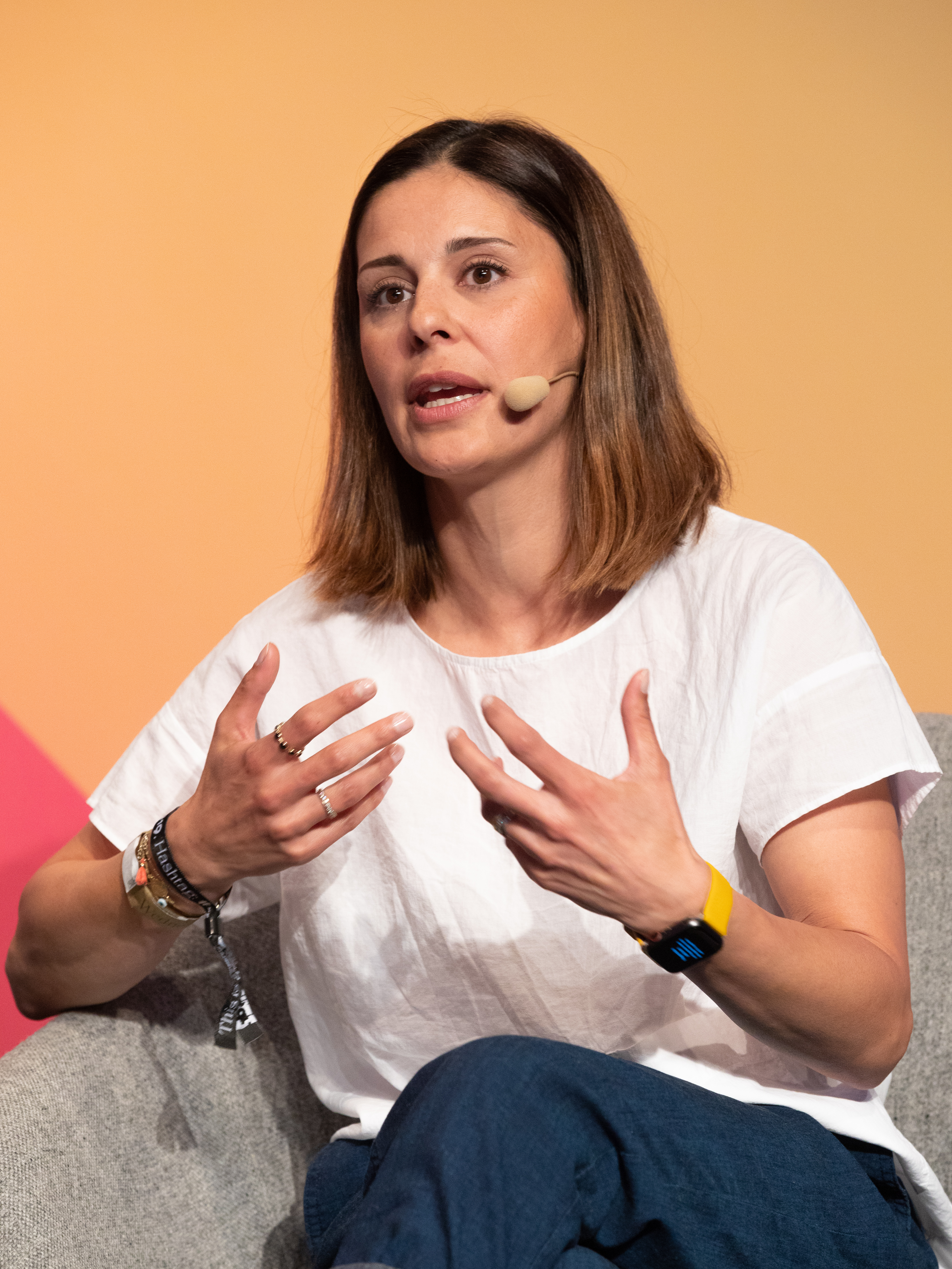
Funda Vanroy

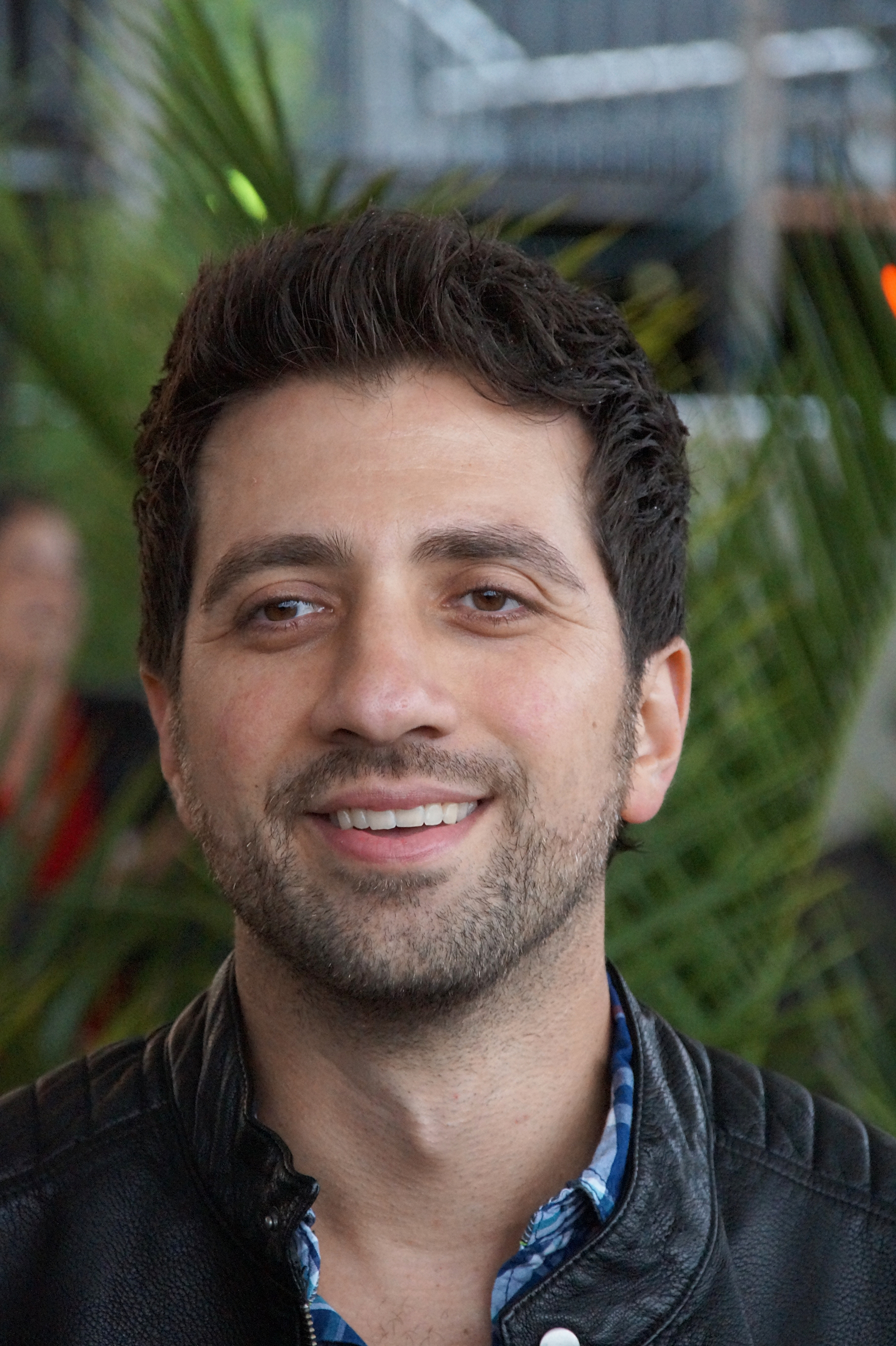
Özgür Yıldırım

- Numan Acar, actor and film producer
- Emine Akbaba, documentary filmmaker
- Fatih Akin, film director, screenwriter and producer
- Bülent Akinci, director and script writer
- Sinan Akkuş, director, writer and actor
- Züli Aladağ, film director, film producer, and screenwriter (Turkish and Kurdish descent)
- Buket Alakuş, film director
- Can Arduc, actor and model
- Erkan Arıkan, TV presenter
- Thomas Arslan, film director
- Yılmaz Arslan, film director
- Öznur Asrav, model for Playboy
- Django Asül, actor and comedian
- Pinar Atalay, television and radio presenter
- Hatice Ayten, documentary director
- Aysun Bademsoy, film director and screenwriter
- Menderes Bağcı, winner of Ich bin ein Star – Holt mich hier raus! (season 10)
- Tevfik Başer, film director and screenwriter
- İdil Baydar, stand-up-comedian
- Tonguç Baykurt, director and screenwriter
- Aslı Bayram, actress and winner of Miss Germany (2005)
- Arzu Bazman, actress and model
- Serap Berrakkarasu, documentary filmmaker
- Sabia Boulahrouz, dancer and Playboy model
- Mehmet Akif Büyükatalay, film director and screenwriter
- Savaş Ceviz, director, screenwriter and film producer
- Özcan Coşar, comedian
- Bülent Ceylan, comedian (Turkish father and German mother)
- Tan Çağlar, comedian, actor, presenter and model
- Nevrez Calışkan, entertainer
- İlker Çatak, film maker
- Bora Dağtekin, screenwriter (Turkish father and German mother)
- Açalya Samyeli Danoğlu, winner of Miss Turkey (2012)
- Neshe Demir, actress and producer
- Yasin Demirel, director and screenwriter
- Bilhan Derin, director
- Seyhan Derin, film maker
- Serdar Dogan, filmmaker
- Serhat Doğan, comedian
- Mustafa Dok, director and film producer
- Şebnem Dönmez, actress, TV host, and former model
- Senay Duzcu, comedian
- Özlem Düvencioğlu, actress and film producer
- Nazan Eckes, TV presenter
- Orkun Ertener, screenwriter; created the KDD – Kriminaldauerdienst television series
- Verena S. Freytag, director and screenwriter (Turkish father and German mother)
- Sadjah Gezza, silent film actress and dancer
- Servet Ahmet Golbol, film director and screenwriter
- Ayla Gottschlich, film director and screenwriter (Turkish mother and German father)
- Halil Gülbeyaz, television journalist, documentary filmmaker and writer
- Erkan Gündüz, actor, stuntman and director
- Galip İyitanır, documentary film director and film editor
- Gülcan Kamps, TV presenter
- Meltem Kaptan, actress and comedian
- Ercan Karaçaylı, actor and director
- Nefise Karatay, actress, TV presenter and model
- Lale Karci, actress and model
- Cüneyt Kaya, director, screenwriter and film producer
- Berrin Keklikler, winner of Miss Universe Turkey 2013
- Serdar Keskin, actor and filmmaker
- Döndü Kılıç, director
- Adnan G. Köse, director, screenwriter, actor, playwright and producer
- Asuman Krause, actress, TV presenter and model (Turkish mother and German father)
- Tunçay Kulaoğlu, filmmaker, journalist and translator
- Bülent Kullukcu, director
- Hussi Kutlucan, filmmaker and actor
- Yasemin Mansoor, winner of Miss Germany (1996) (Turkish Iraqi origin)
- Can Mansuroglu, filmmaker, journalist and presenter (Turkish father and German mother)
- Dilek Mayatürk-Yücel, documentary film producer
- Hakan Savaş Mican, filmmaker and playwright
- Fatma Mittler-Solak, television presenter
- Esin Moralıoğlu, actress and model
- Lale Nalbant, film director
- Mirza Odabaşı, film director
- Baran bo Odar, film and television director and screenwriter (Turkish mother and Russian father)
- Osman Okkan, film maker
- Kenan Ormanlar, actor and film producer (Turkish Macedonian origin)
- Eren Önsöz, filmmaker
- Olcay Özdemir, TV presenter
- Olgun Özdemir, director and screenwriter
- Gülsel Özkan, film director and screenwriter
- Biene Pilavci, filmmaker and actress
- Ayşe Polat, script writer and film director (Turkish and Kurdish origin)
- Seren Sahin, film producer and actor
- Sinem Sakaoglu, puppet cartoon director (Turkish and American origin)
- Ayhan Salar, film director
- Seran Sargur, broadcasting manager of Kanal Avrupa
- Özlem Sarıkaya, television journalist and presenter
- Jennifer Şebnem Schaefer, actress, TV presenter and model (Turkish mother and German father)
- Alev Seker, news anchor and television presenter
- Bülent Sharif, actor and model
- Candan Six-Sasmaz, TV writer and journalist
- Serdar Somuncu, comedian
- Deniz Sözbir, film maker (Turkish father and German mother)
- Kadir Sözen, film maker
- Suzan Şekerci, film maker
- Pinar Tanrikolu, television presenter
- Ahmet Taş, filmmaker
- Aylin Tezel, actress and dancer
- Murat Topal, comedian (Turkish father and German mother)
- Leyla Lydia Tuğutlu, actress, model and winner of Miss Turkey (2008) (Turkish father and German mother)
- Su Turhan, director and screenwriter
- Murat Ünal, film director, screenwriter, film producer, editor and actor
- Selma Üsük, TV and radio presenter
- Funda Vanroy, TV presenter and actress
- Marcus Vetter, documentary filmmaker (Turkish father and German mother)
- Kaya Yanar, comedian
- Mennan Yapo, director, screenwriter, producer and actor
- Osan Yaran, comedian
- Erol Yesilkaya, screenwriter
- Özgür Yıldırım, film director

== Fashion ==
- Tanju Babacan, fashion designer
- Yüksel D., fashion designer

== Food ==
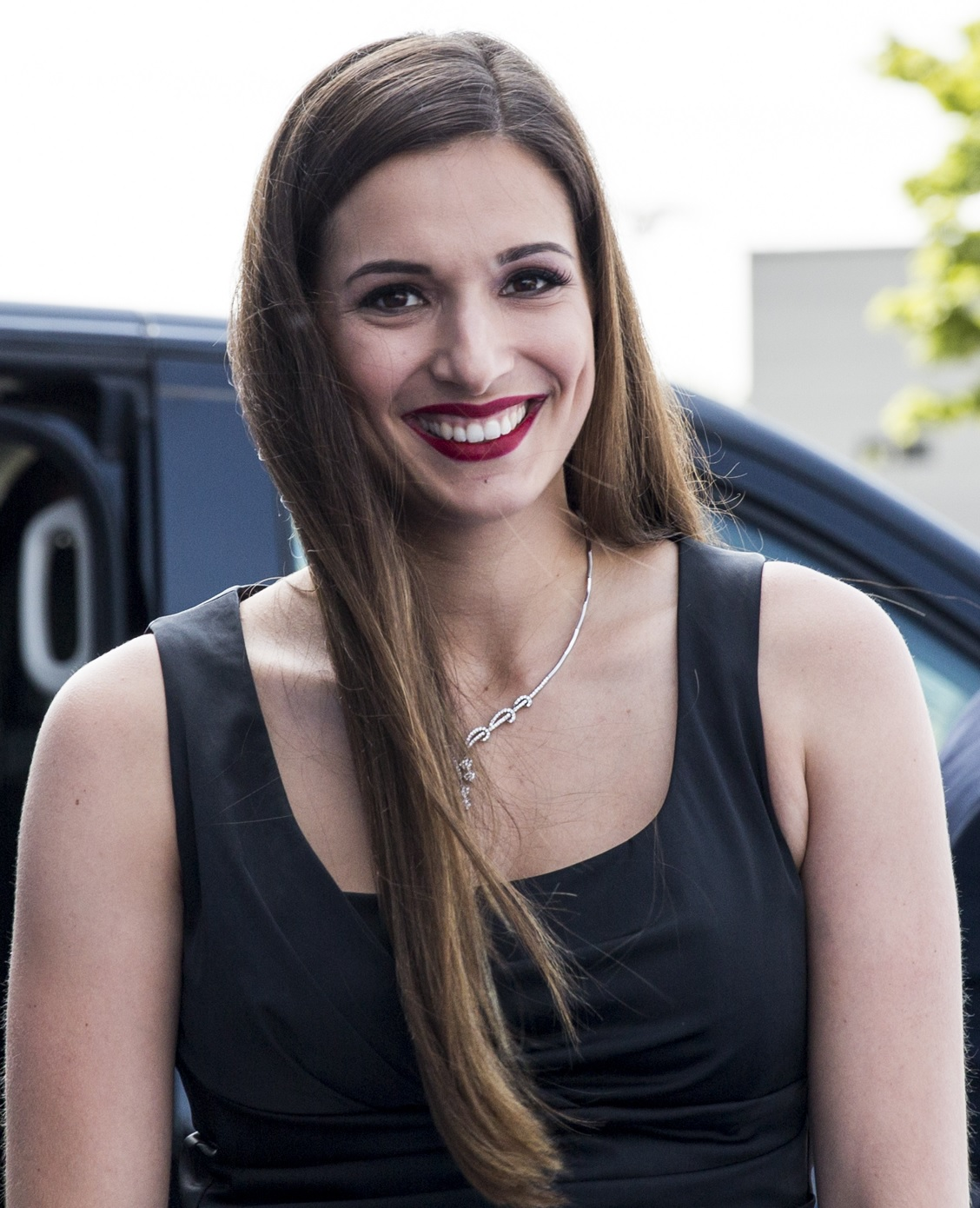
Sally Özcan

- Marco Akuzun, Michelin star chef (Turkish father and German mother)
- Mehmet Aygün, restaurateur
- Ali Güngörmüşn, Michelin star chef
- Attila Hildmann, cookbook author and far-right conspiracy theorist
- Ali Riza Kaya, restaurateur and author of cookbooks on Turkish cuisine
- Sally Özcan, runs Germany's most successful YouTube channel on cooking and baking
- Edip Sigl, celebrity chef

== Law ==
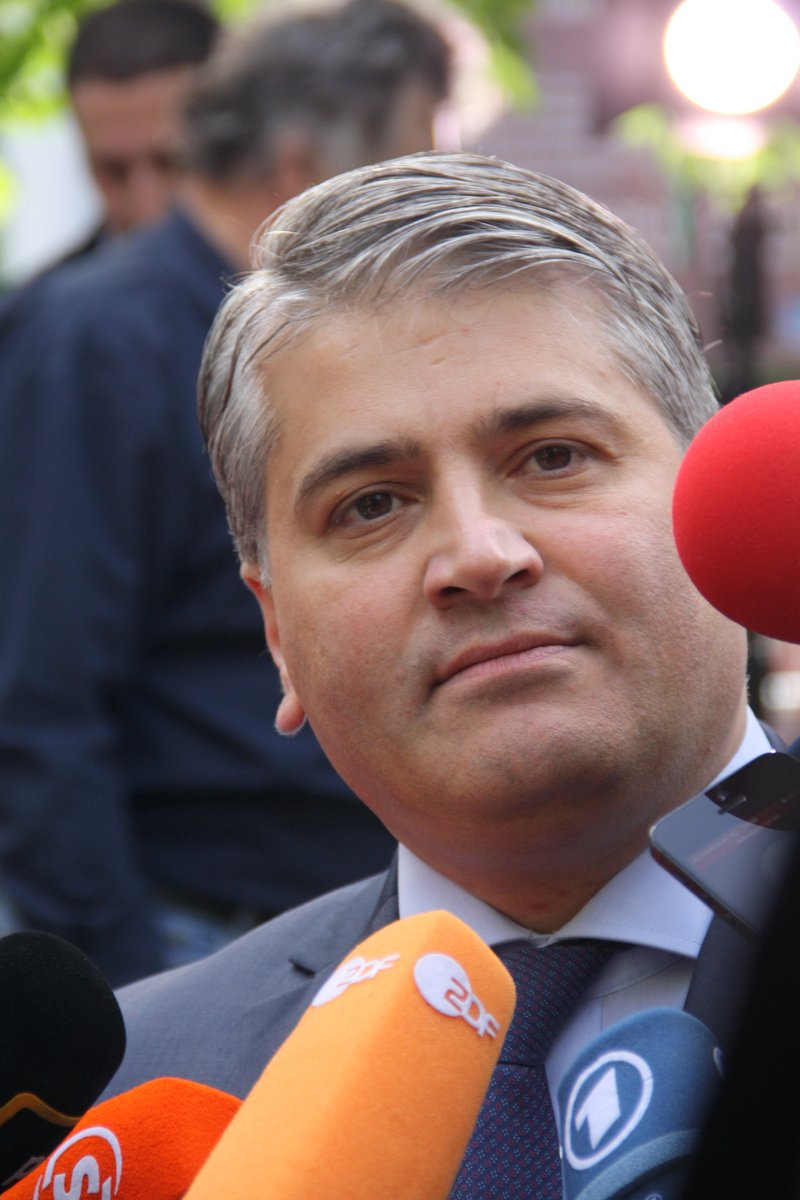
Mehmet Daimagüler

- Ahmet Alagün, the first Berliner with Turkish roots to serve as a judge at the Constitutional Court of the State of Berlin
- Tuğrul Ansay, legal scholar
- Aysun Cenk, lawyer
- Mehmet Daimagüler, lawyer and politician
- Kazim Görgülü, father who fought for the right of access to his son after the German mother unilaterally released him for adoption after giving birth without Görgülü's knowledge; the case reached the European Court of Human Rights
- Derman Kanal, lawyer and entrepreneur
- Murat Kayman, lawyer and legal advisor to the DITIB Federal Association (2014–17)
- Müjgan Perçin, lawyer and federal manager of the German Fire Brigade Association
- Sinan Selen, lawyer; Vice President of the Federal Office for the Protection of the Constitution (2019–present)
- Nurhan Soykan, lawyer and general secretary of the Central Council of Muslims in Germany (ZMD)
- Erkut Sogut, lawyer and sports agent
- Tülin Ünal, first former Turkish citizen to become a German civil servant.

== Military ==
- Beutetürken, Ottoman prisoners of war
- Karl Boy-Ed, naval attaché to the German embassy in Washington during World War I (Turkish father and German mother)
- Frederick Augustus Rutowsky, Saxon Field Marshal (Ottoman Turkish mother and Polish father)

== Music ==
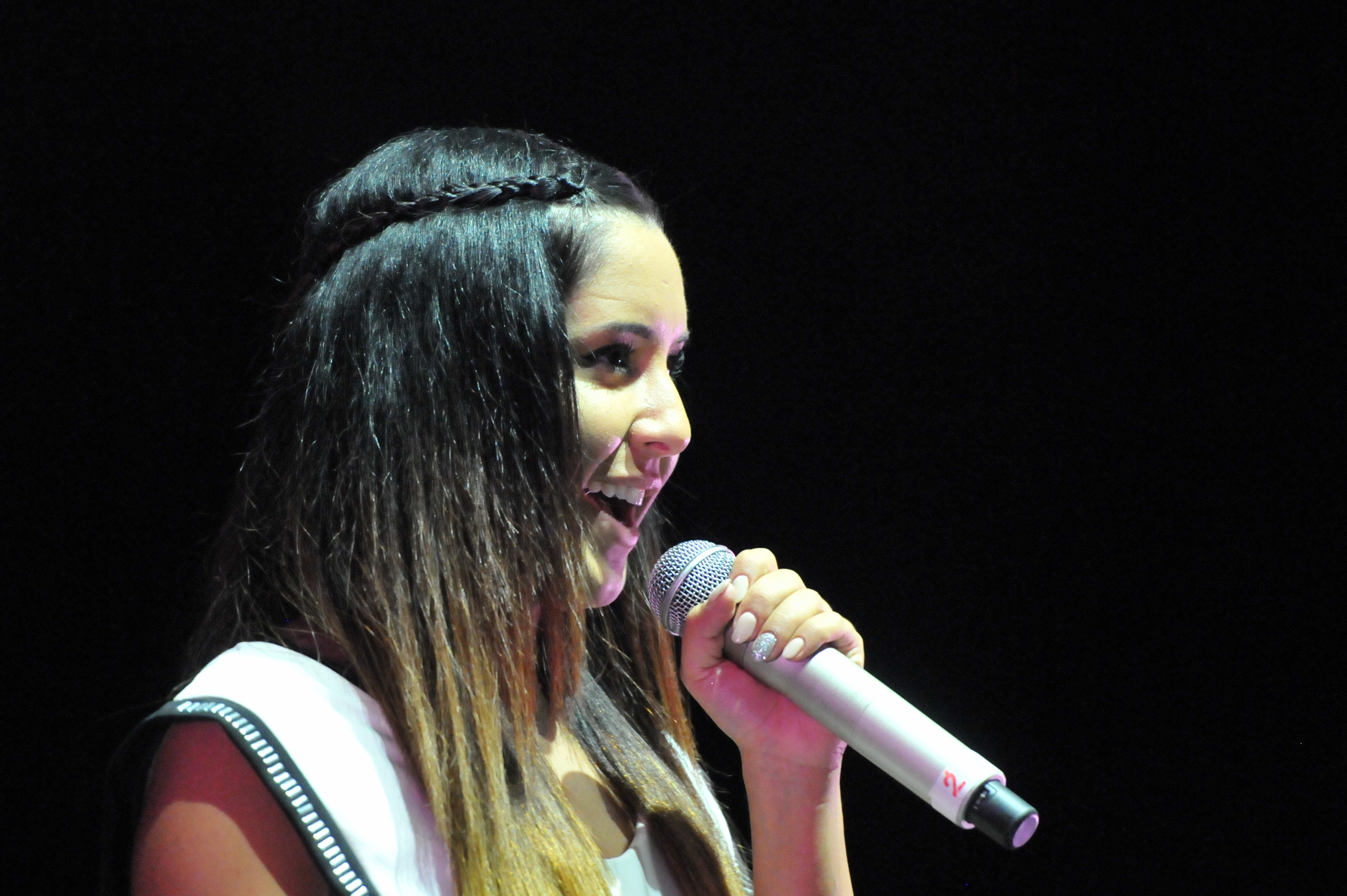
Meltem Acikgöz

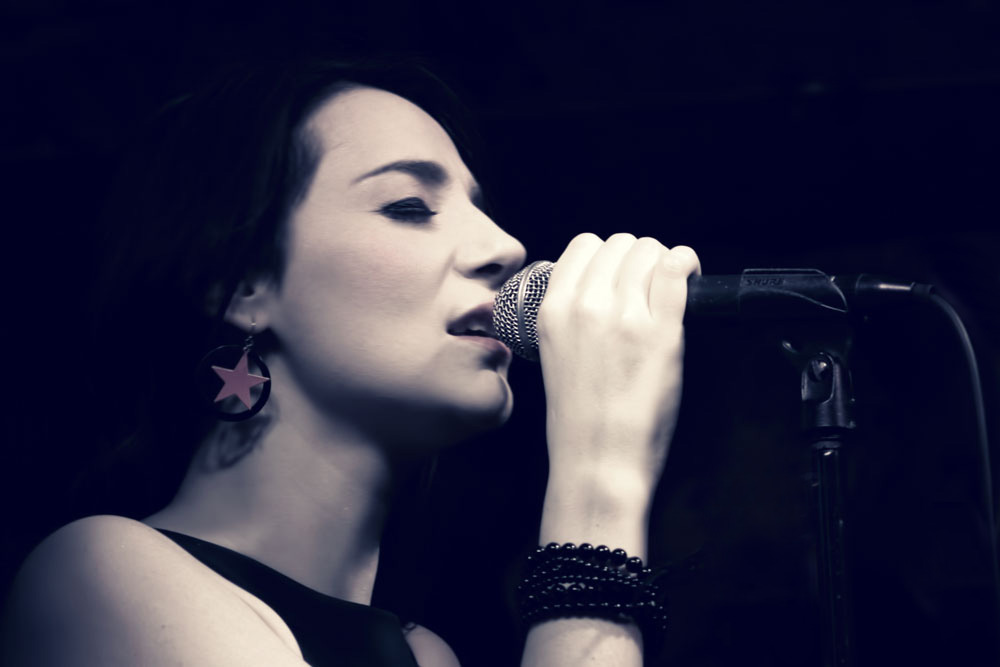
Aylin Aslım

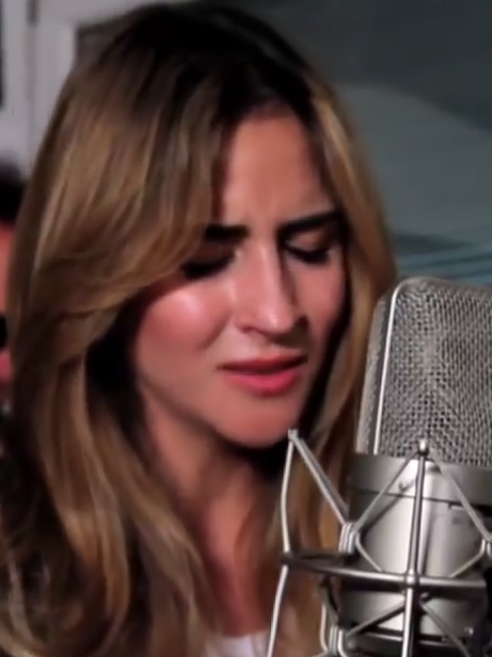
Aynur Aydın

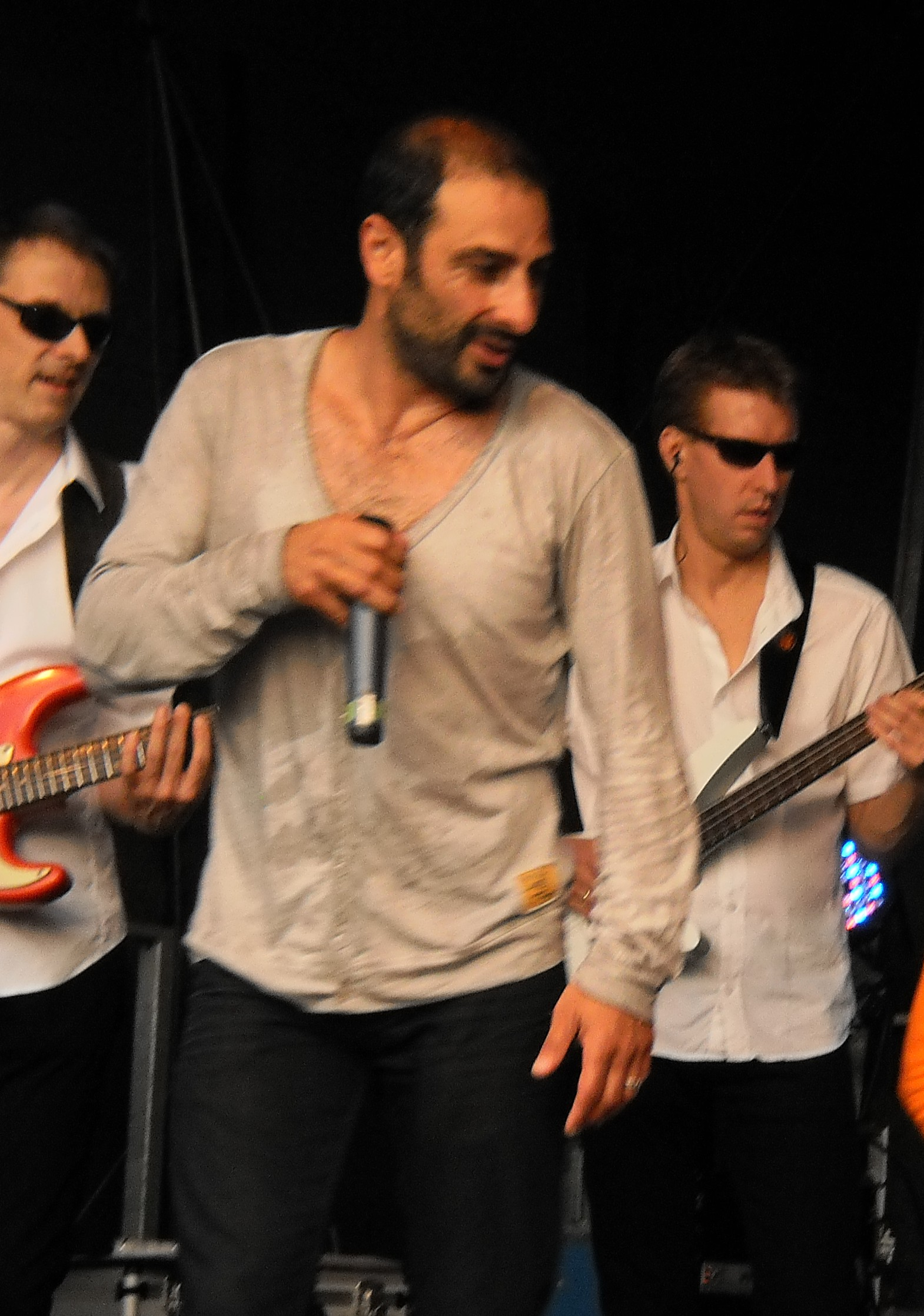
Volkan Baydar

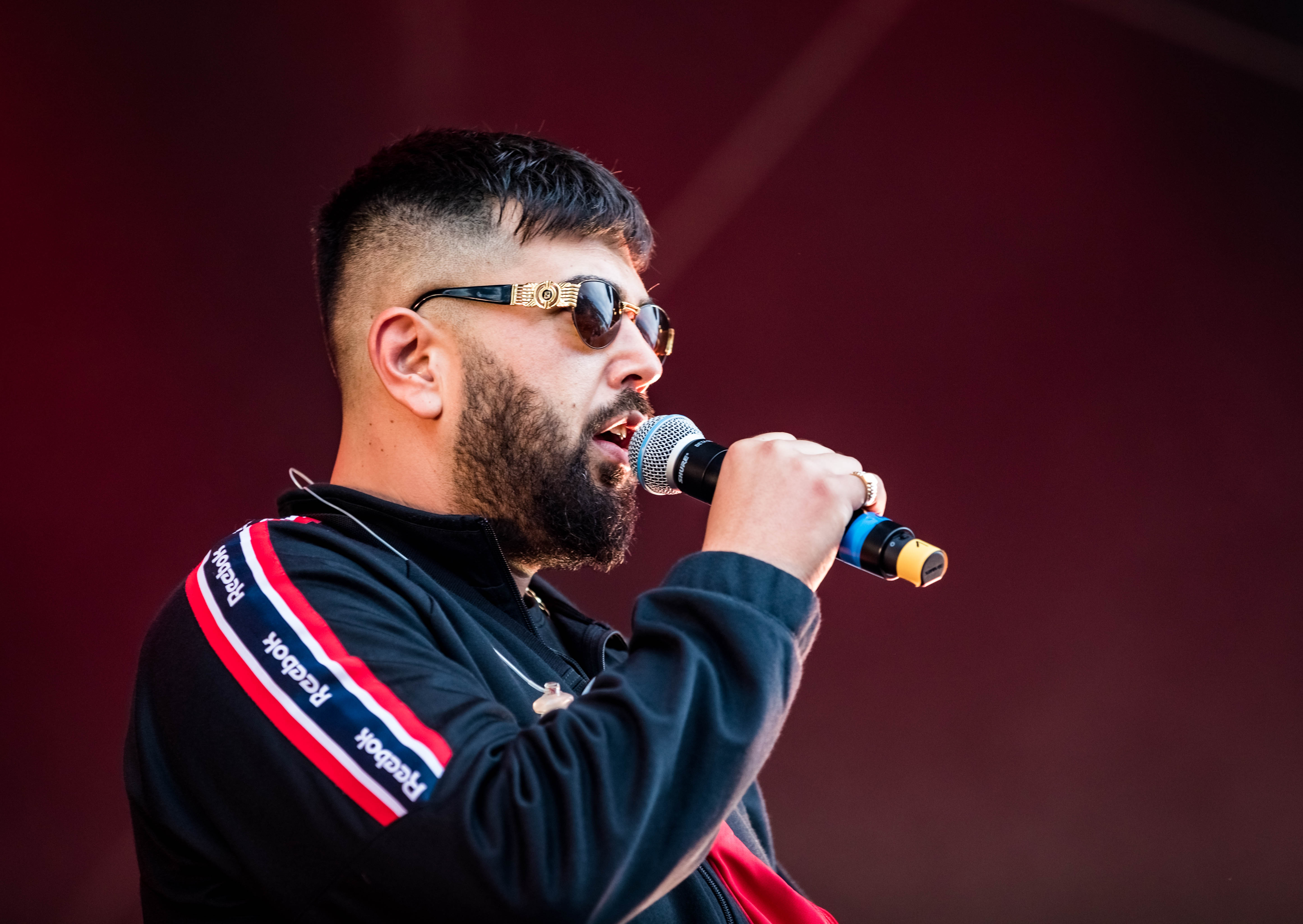
Summer Cem

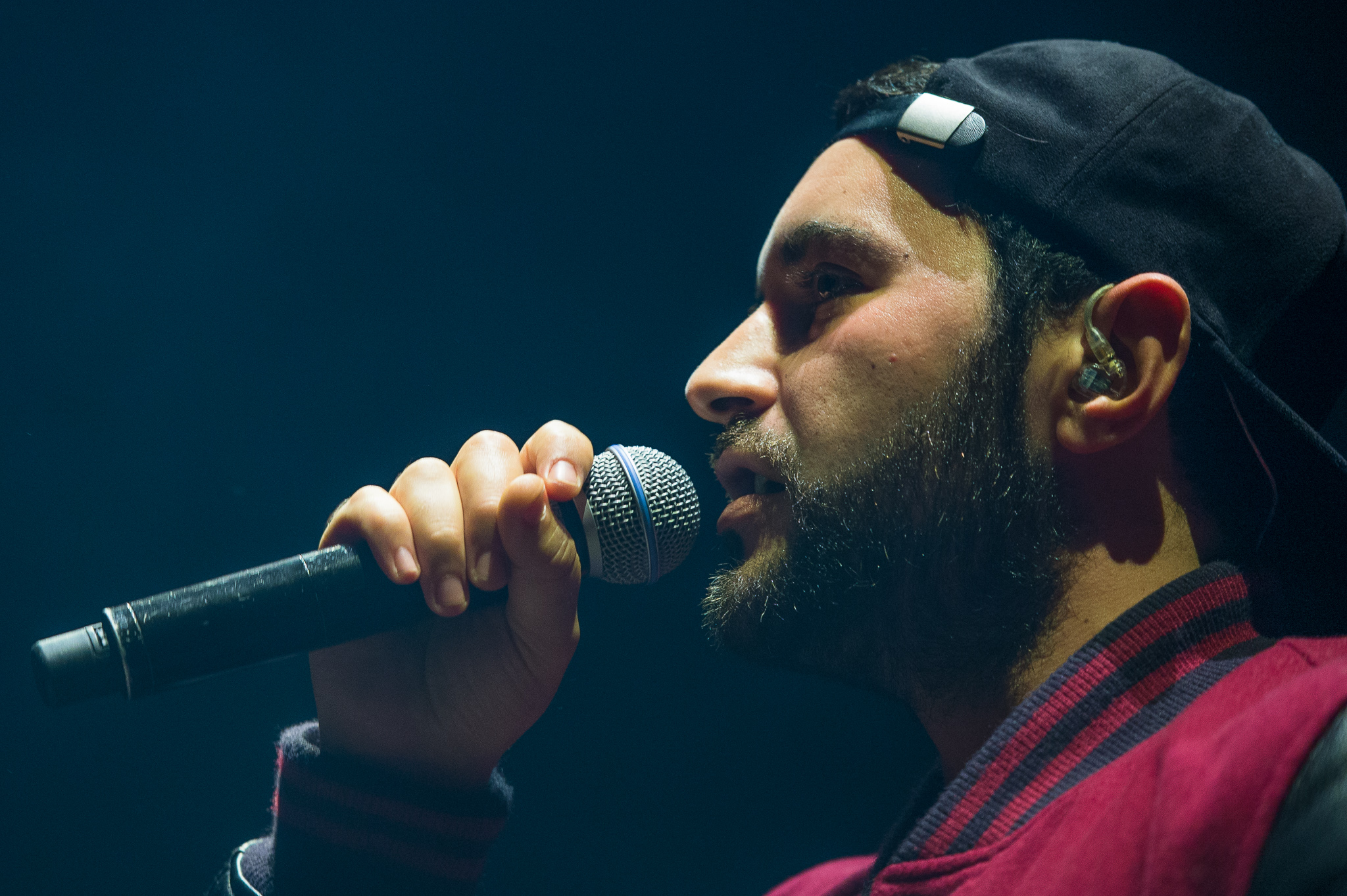
Chefket

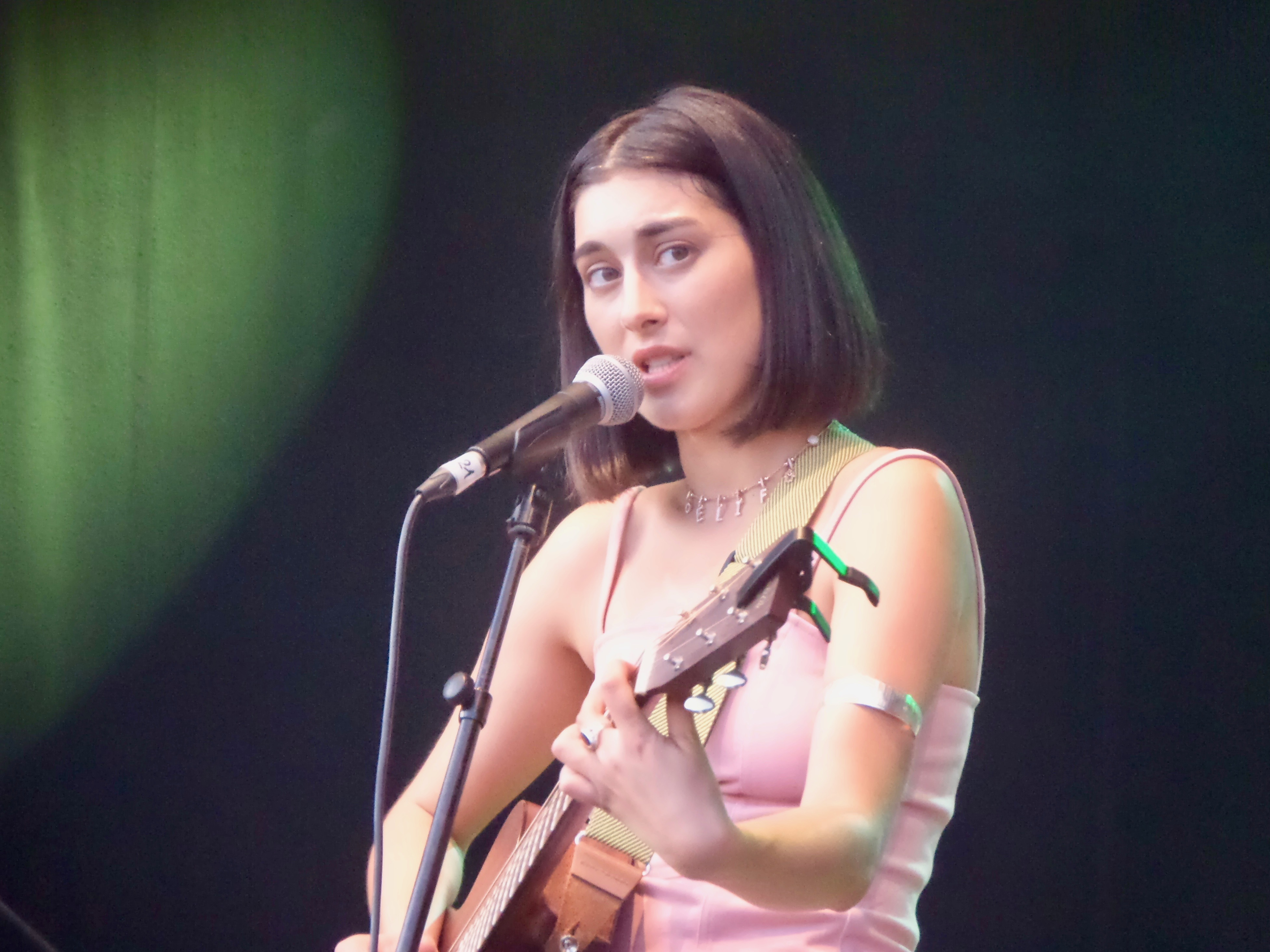
Elif Demirezer

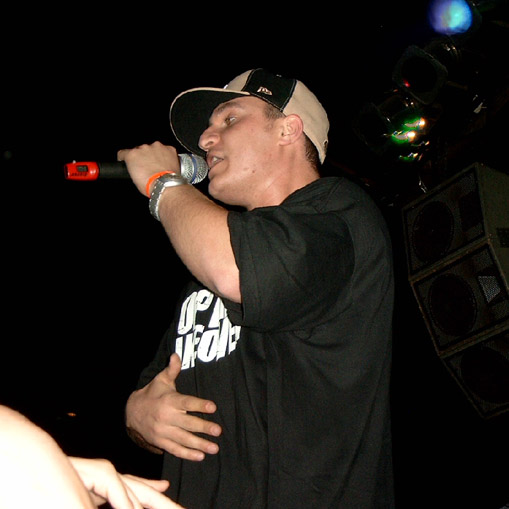
Ercandize

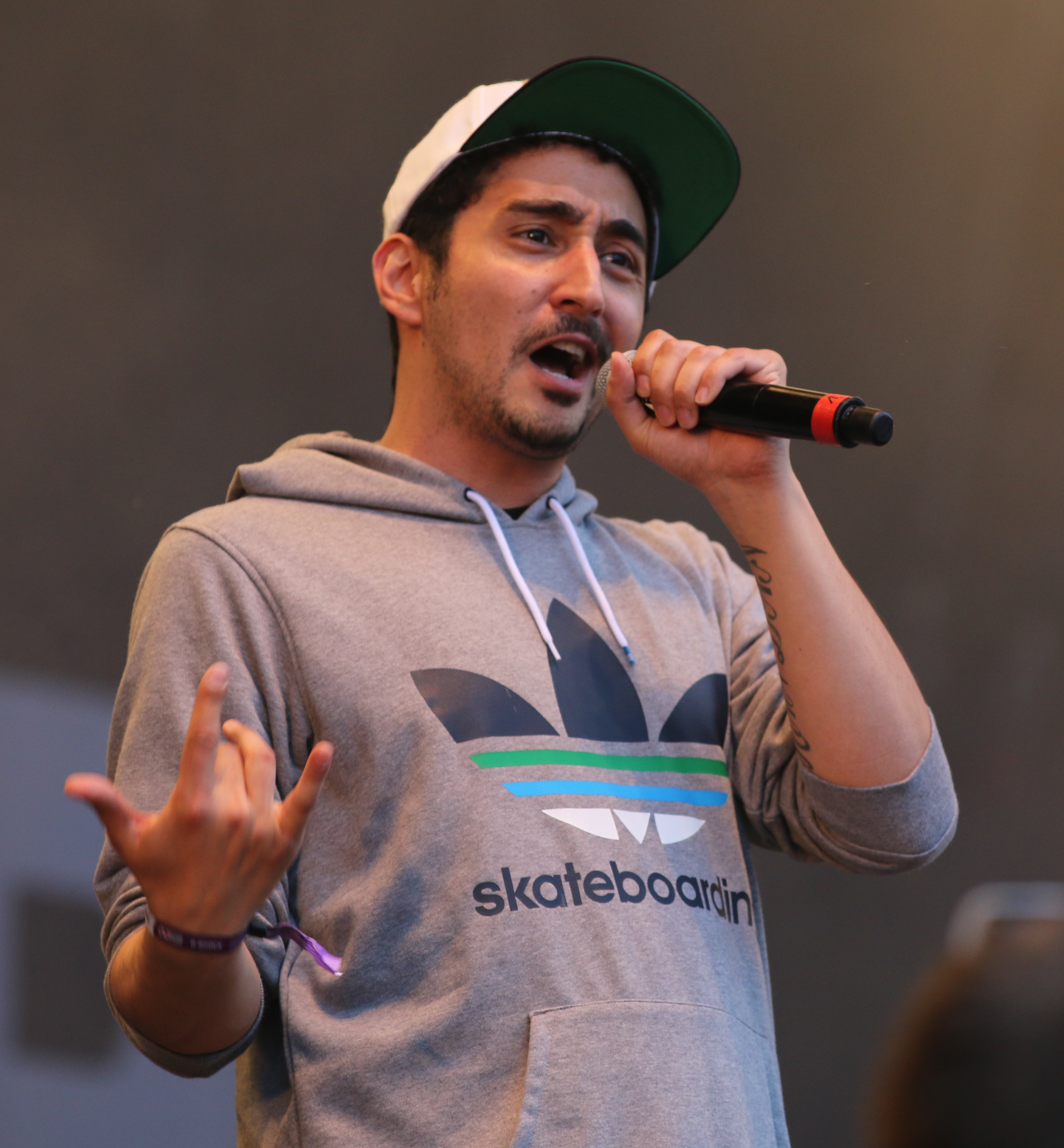
Eko Fresh

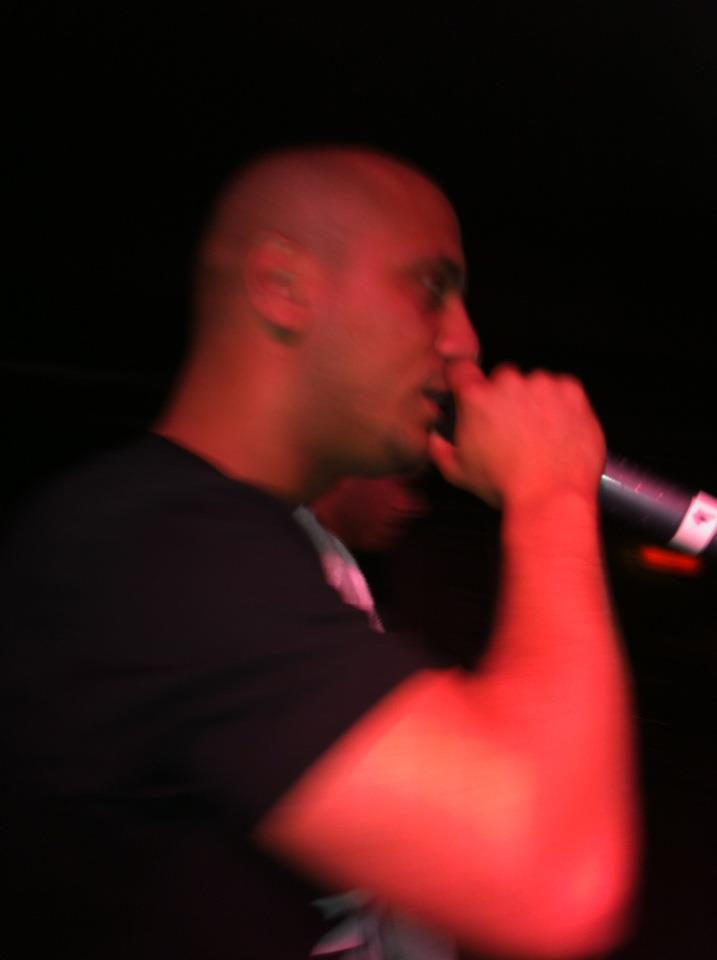
Alpa Gun

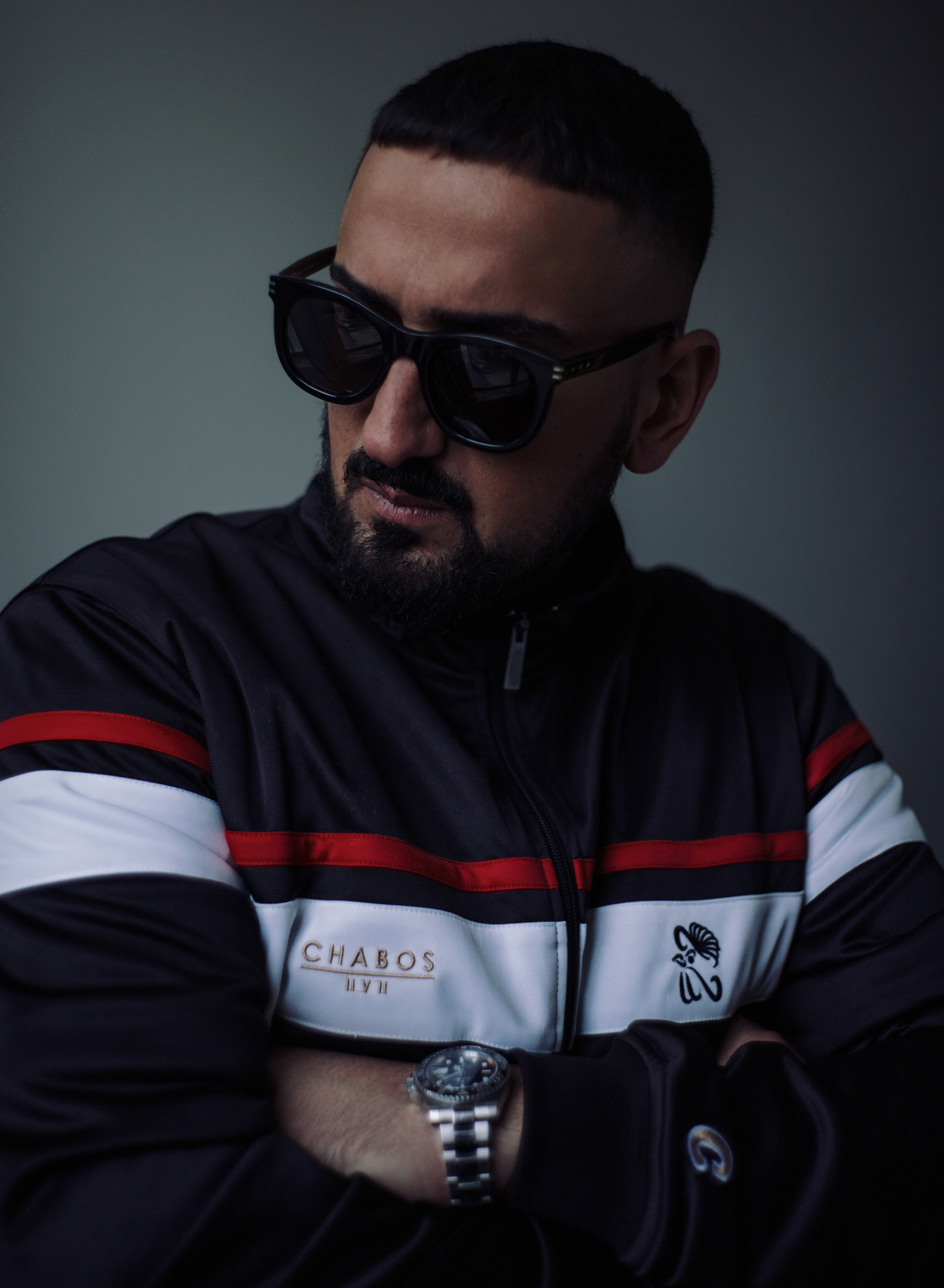
Haftbefehl

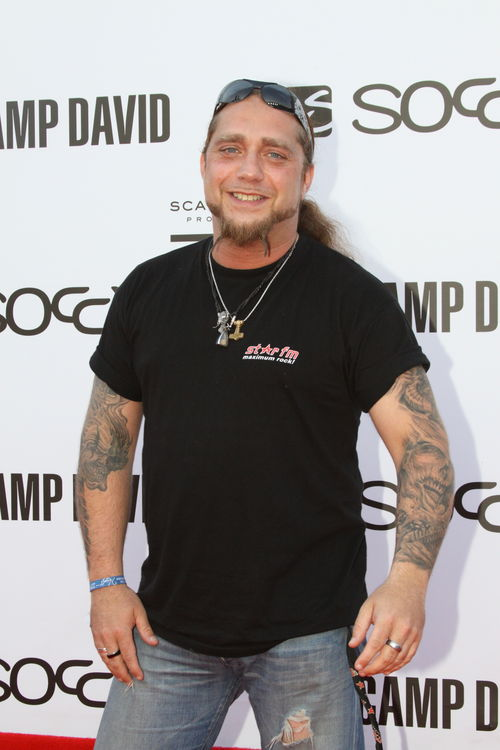
Martin Kesici

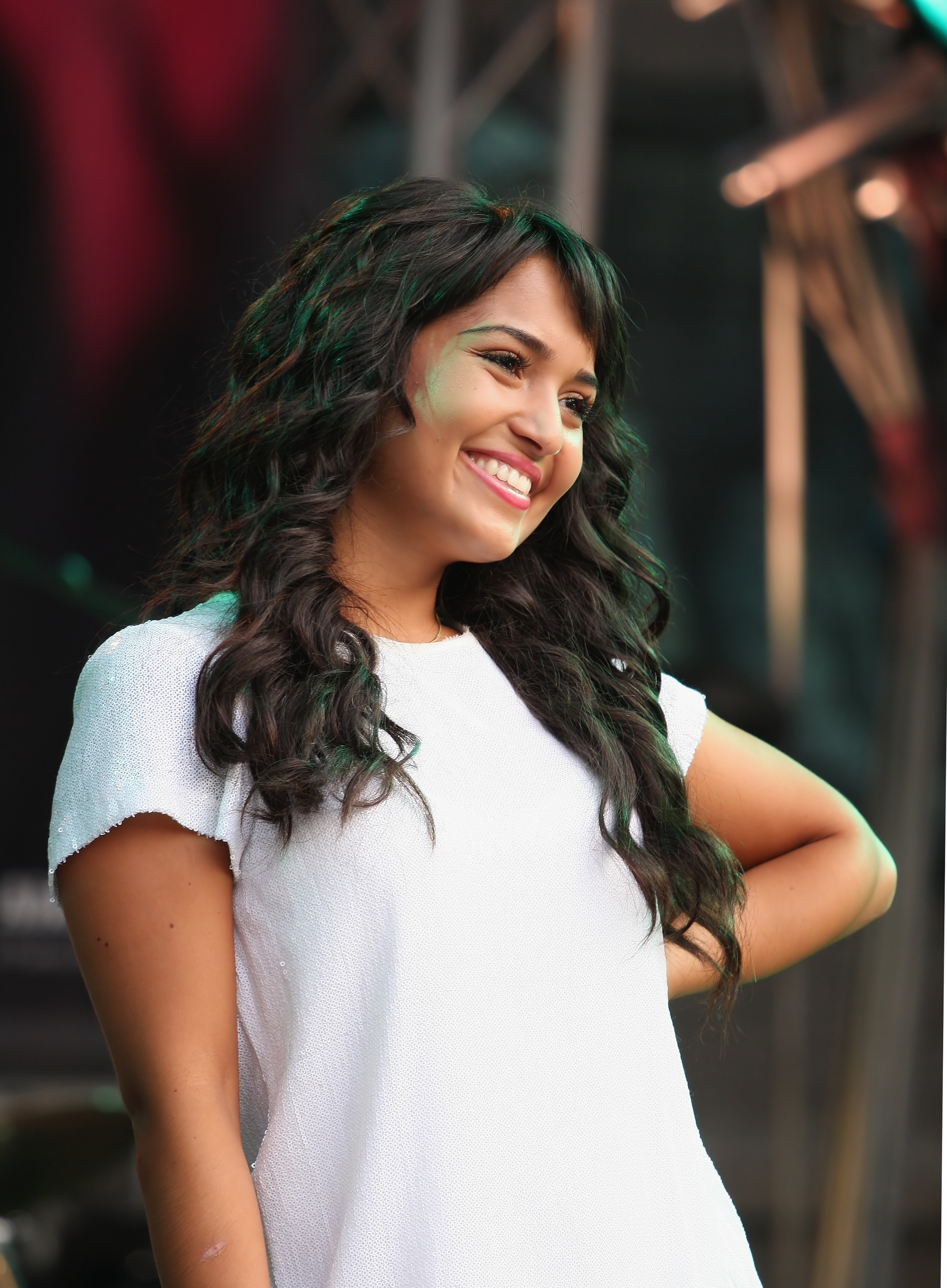
Bahar Kizil

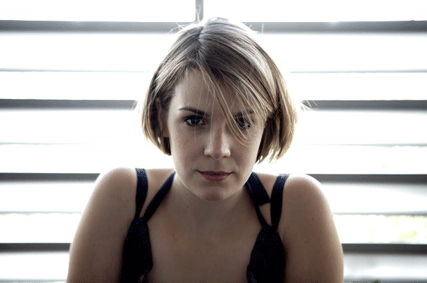
Alev Lenz

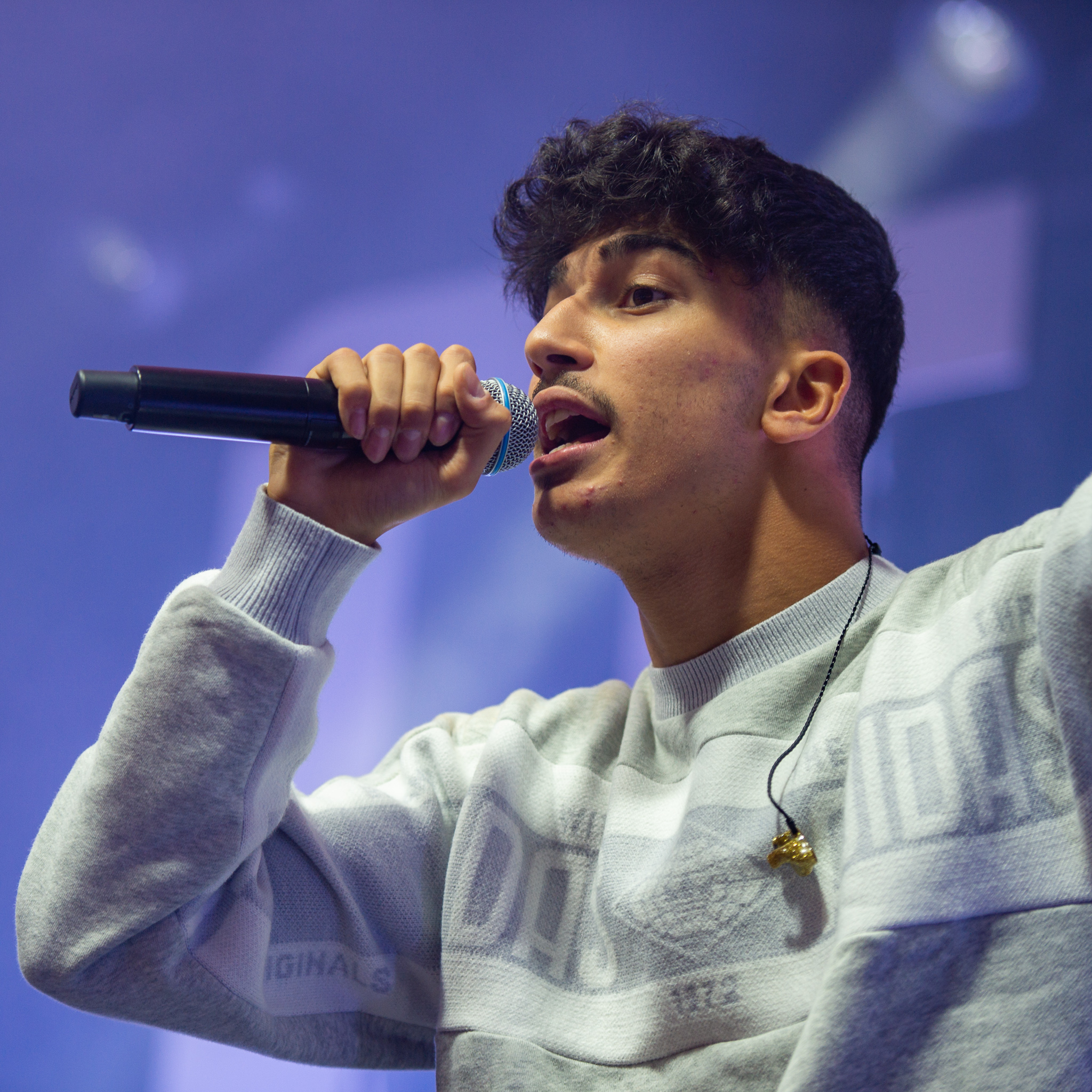
Mero

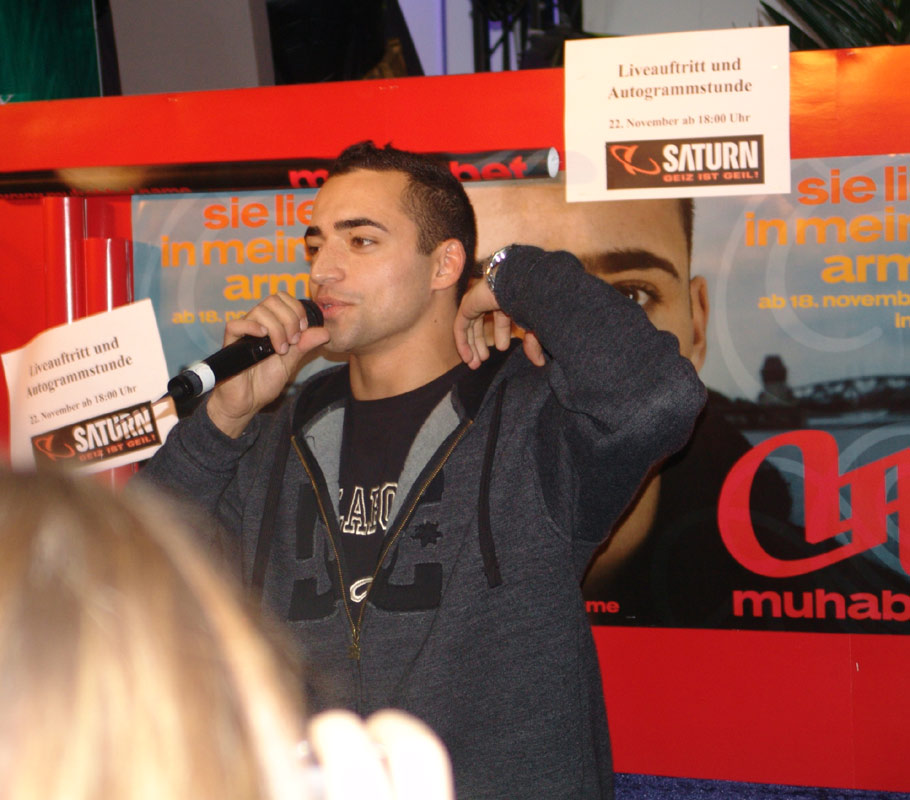
Muhabbet

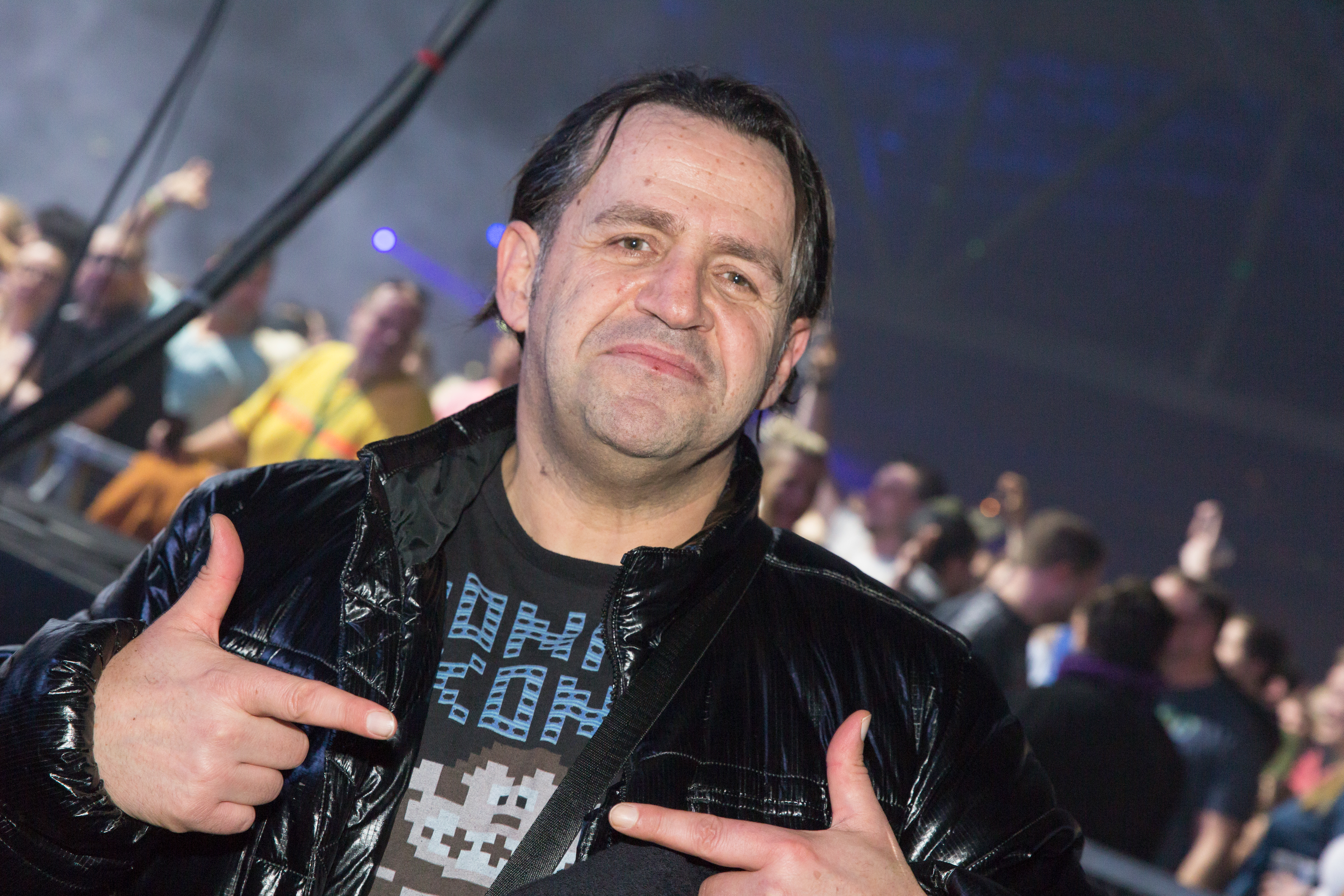
DJ Quicksilver

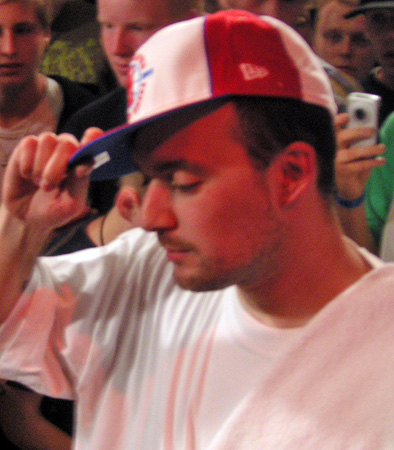
Kool Savas

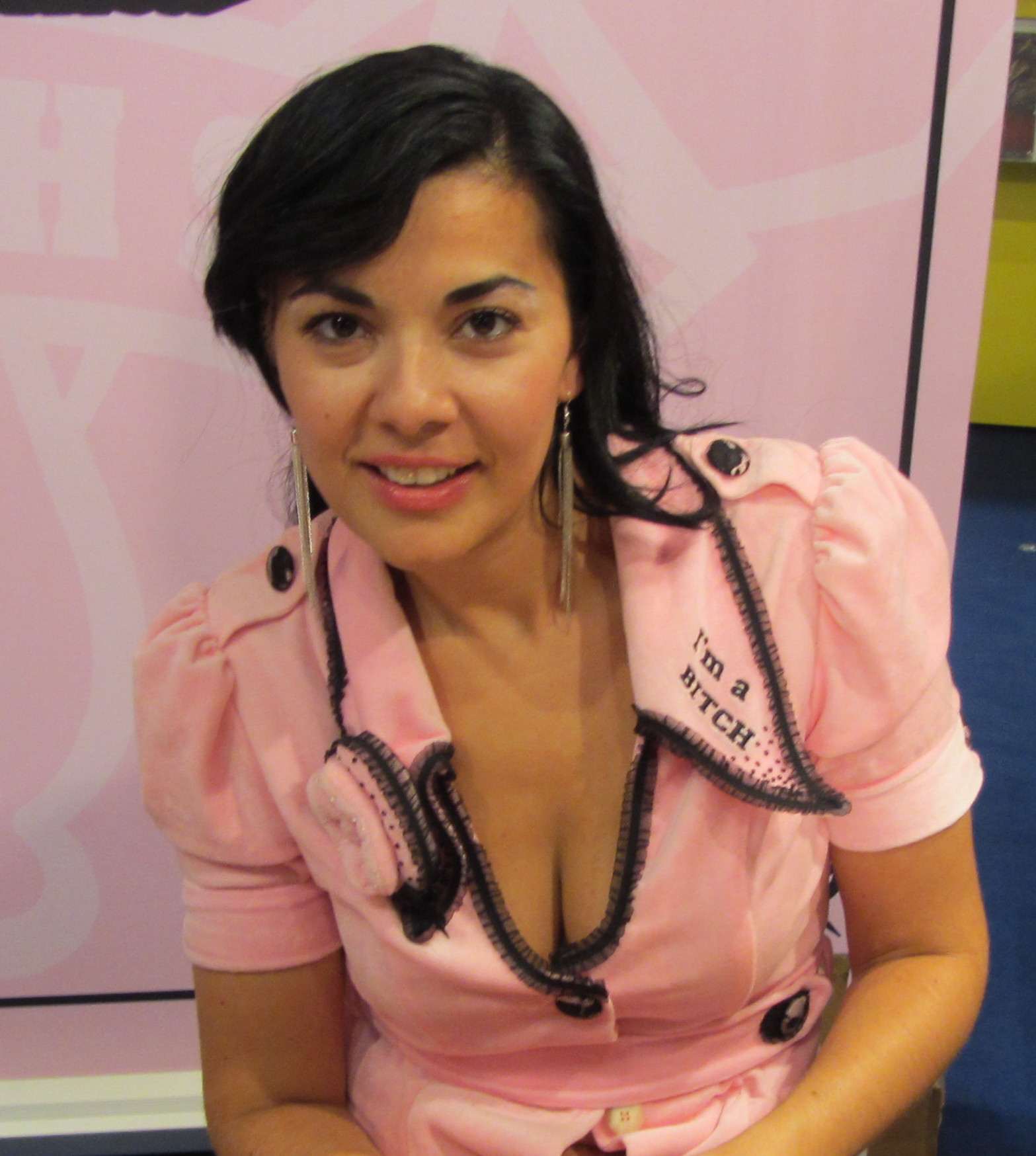
Reyhan Şahin

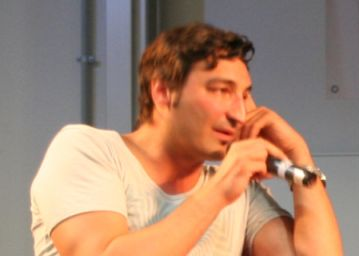
Mousse T.

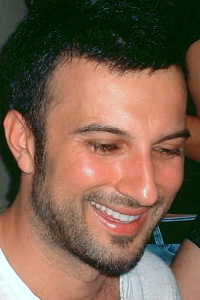
Tarkan

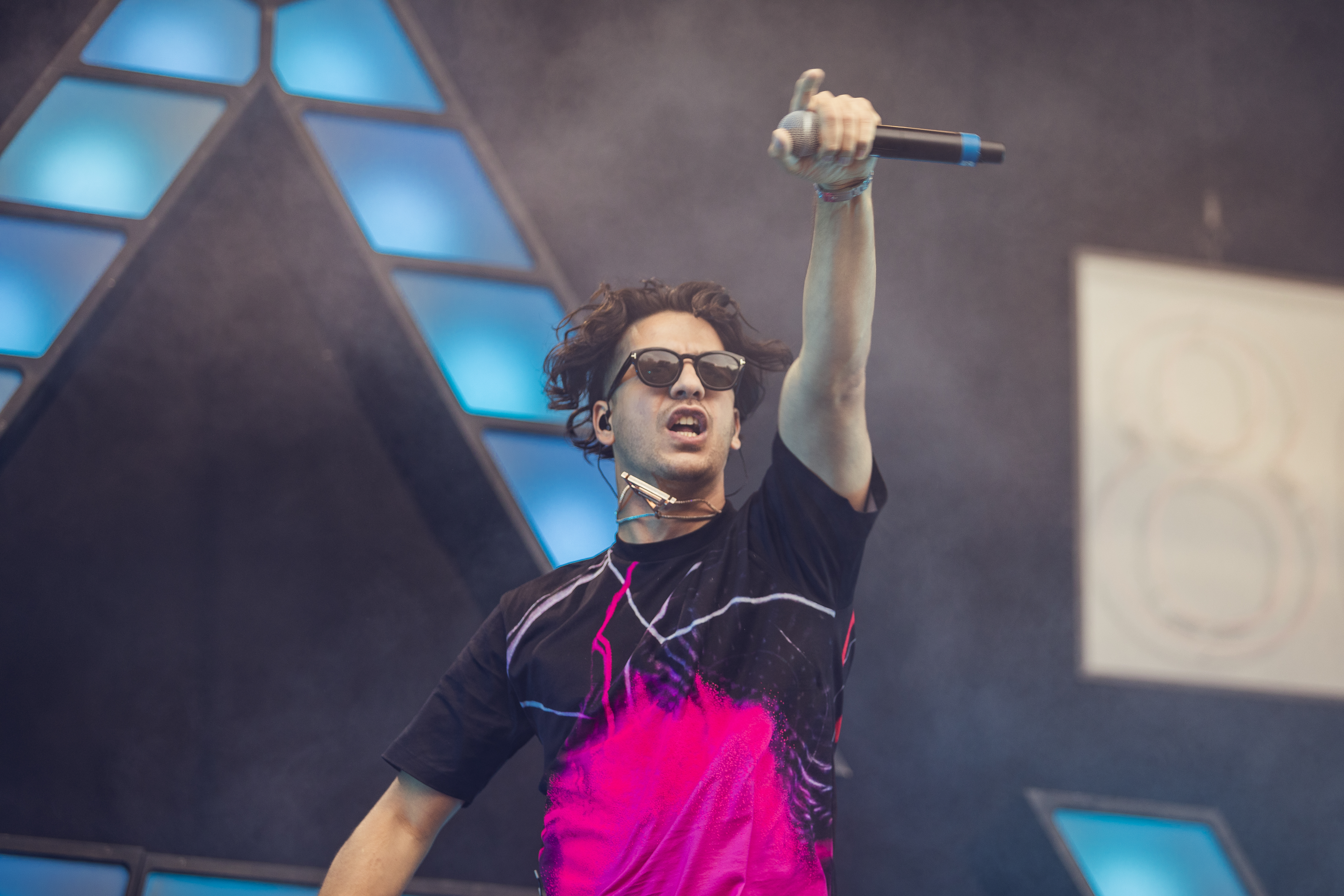
Ufo361

- Aziza A., rapper
- Meltem Acikgöz, DSDS Finalist 2014
- Aydo Abay, singer and songwriter
- Sermet Agartan, music producer, composer, and songwriter
- Alper Ağa, rapper
- Kazim Akboga, singer, songwriter, composer, and DJ
- Tansel Akzeybek, operatic tenor
- Ali471, rapper
- Ano (rapper), rapper
- Apache 207, rapper
- Bülent Aris, music producer
- C Arma, R&B singer
- Ali N. Askin, composer, arranger, and music producer
- Aylin Aslım, singer and songwriter
- Ateed, singer (Turkish Western Thracian mother and Iranian father)
- Automatikk, rap duo
- Aynur Aydın, singer and songwriter
- Gülhan Aydın, rock and electronic musician
- Ayliva, musician
- Azra, rapper
- Boe B, rapper
- Bacapon, rapper
- Emine Bahar, musician (Turkish mother and a Kurdish father)
- Volkan Baydar, singer and composer
- KD Beatz, hip-hop producer (Turkish and Algerian origin)
- Bernd Begemann, singer, guitarist and entertainer (Turkish father and German mother)
- Bektas, rapper
- BRKN (Turkish, Armenian and Kurdish origin)
- Capo, rapper (Turkish mother and Kurdish father)
- Caput, rapper
- Selcuk Cara, opera singer
- Cartel, rap group
- Summer Cem, rapper
- Özlem Cetin, singer and songwriter
- Chefket, rapper and singer
- Aylin Coşkun, singer
- Murat Coşkun, musicologist
- Credibil, rapper
- Işın Çakmakcıoğlu, violinist and a member of the Melbourne Symphony Orchestra (Turkish German origin)
- Kazım Çalışgan, musician; part of the Çalışgan & Heuser duo
- Burak Çebi, pianist
- Esra Dalfidan, jazz singer
- Elif Demirezer, pop singer
- Atiye Deniz, singer
- Derdiyoklar, folk group
- Parah Dice, DJ and record producer
- Kemal Dinç, folk artist
- Doğuş (singer), singer
- Güler Duman, singer, songwriter, and composer
- Erci E, rapper
- Akın Eldes, guitarist
- Emre Elivar, concert pianist
- Ercandize, rapper
- Erci E, musician, producer and radio host
- Simone Eriksrud, musician, singer and composer (Turkish father and a German mother)
- Abdullah Eryilmaz, songwriter and bookseller
- Len Faki, DJ and music producer
- Eko Fresh, rapper
- Islamic Force, Oriental hip hop group
- DJ Mahmut & Murat G., hip-hop duo
- G-Hot, rapper
- Laia Genc, jazz pianist (Turkish father and German mother)
- Duygu Goenel, DSDS Finalist 2017
- Mert Gökmen, R&B singer
- Gringo (rapper), rapper
- Alpa Gun, rapper
- Erkan Gümüşsuyu, singer
- Betin Güneş, composer, conductor and pianist of classical music
- Murat Güngör, music producer
- Ali Güven (musician), musician
- Haftbefehl, rapper (Turkish mother and Kurdish father)
- Killa Hakan, rapper
- Ümit Han, electronic musician, producer and composer
- Hava, rapper (Turkish father and Bosnian mother)
- Nedim Hazar, musician and composer
- Bass Sultan Hengzt, rapper (Turkish mother and Italian father)
- Turgay Hilmi, French horn player (Turkish Cypriot origin)
- Isar (rapper), rapper
- İpek İpekçioğlu, DJ
- Jazn, rapper
- Jiggo, rapper (Turkish father and Spanish mother)
- Hasan.K, rapper
- Sady K, singer
- Gültekin Kaan, musician and singer
- Kemelion, musician and singer-songwriter
- Hülya Kandemir, songwriter and folk singer
- Kader Kesek, musician, songwriter, lyricist, director and music producer
- Karakan, rap group
- Timur Karakuş, lead singer of the rock band Schöngeist
- Martin Kesici, singer and songwriter (Turkish father and German mother)
- Asli Kilic, pianist
- Bahar Kizil, singer
- Kobra (Band), rock group
- Deniz Koyu, disc jockey and electronic dance music producer
- Kex Kuhl, rapper
- Alev Lenz, record producer, singer/songwriter and composer (Turkish mother and German father)
- Limanja, music band
- Lot (musician), musician
- Maestro (musician), rapper
- Microphone Mafia, rap group (Turkish and Italian members)
- Massaka, rapper
- Mel (musician), singer, rapper and songwriter
- Melendiz (musician), musician
- Mero, rapper
- Sero El Mero, rapper
- Mert, rapper
- Metrickz, rapper (Turkish father and German mother)
- MOK, rapper
- Sema Moritz, singer
- Muhabbet, singer
- Ozan Musluoğlu, member of Athena
- Engin Nurşani, folk musician
- Omero (rapper), rapper and songwriter
- Can Oral, DJ (Turkish father and a Finnish mother)
- Cem Oral, musician (Turkish father and Finnish mother)
- Nilüfer Örer, pop singer
- Özlem Özdil, singer and saz player
- Engin Öztürk, musician
- Hande Özyürek,
- Da Crime Posse, Oriental hip-hop group
- Playboy 51, singer and rapper
- Prodycem, producer and rapper
- DJ Quicksilver, DJ and music producer
- Remoe, singer, rapper, songwriter and producer
- Rafet el Roman, singer
- Freddy Sahin-Scholl, singer and composer (Turkish-German mother)
- DJ Sakin, trance music producer
- Kool Savas, (Turkish father and German mother)
- Samira Saygili, singer and composer
- Sevtap Sonu, folk musician
- Benyamin Sönmez, classical cellist
- Pamela Spence, singer (Turkish mother and American father)
- Muhammed Suiçmez, member of Necrophagist
- Defne Şahin, jazz musician
- Reyhan Şahin, rapper, linguist and former radio host
- Sürpriz, pop group; represented Germany in the Eurovision Song Contest 1999
- Mousse T., DJ and record producer
- Volkan T., rapper, hip-hop musician and producer
- Tachiles, singer, rapper, and hip-hop musician
- Rüya Taner, pianist (Turkish Cypriot origin)
- Grup Tekkan, band
- Tarkan Tevetoğlu, singer and songwriter
- Sultan Tunc, rapper
- Şah Turna, folk poet
- DJ Tuneruno, music producer and DJ
- Metin Türköz, songwriter
- Ufo361, rapper
- Tamer Ülker, former member of Jamatami; pop singer, dancer, choreographer and model
- Grup Ünlü, rock band
- Kenan Williams, pop singer
- Ufuk Yıldırım, pop singer
- İsmail YK, pop singer
- Meriç Yurdatapan, jazz singer
- Ünal Yüksel, music producer and managing director of the music label Plak Music
- Orhan Osman, musician and bouzouki artist (Western Thrace Turk origin)

== Politics ==
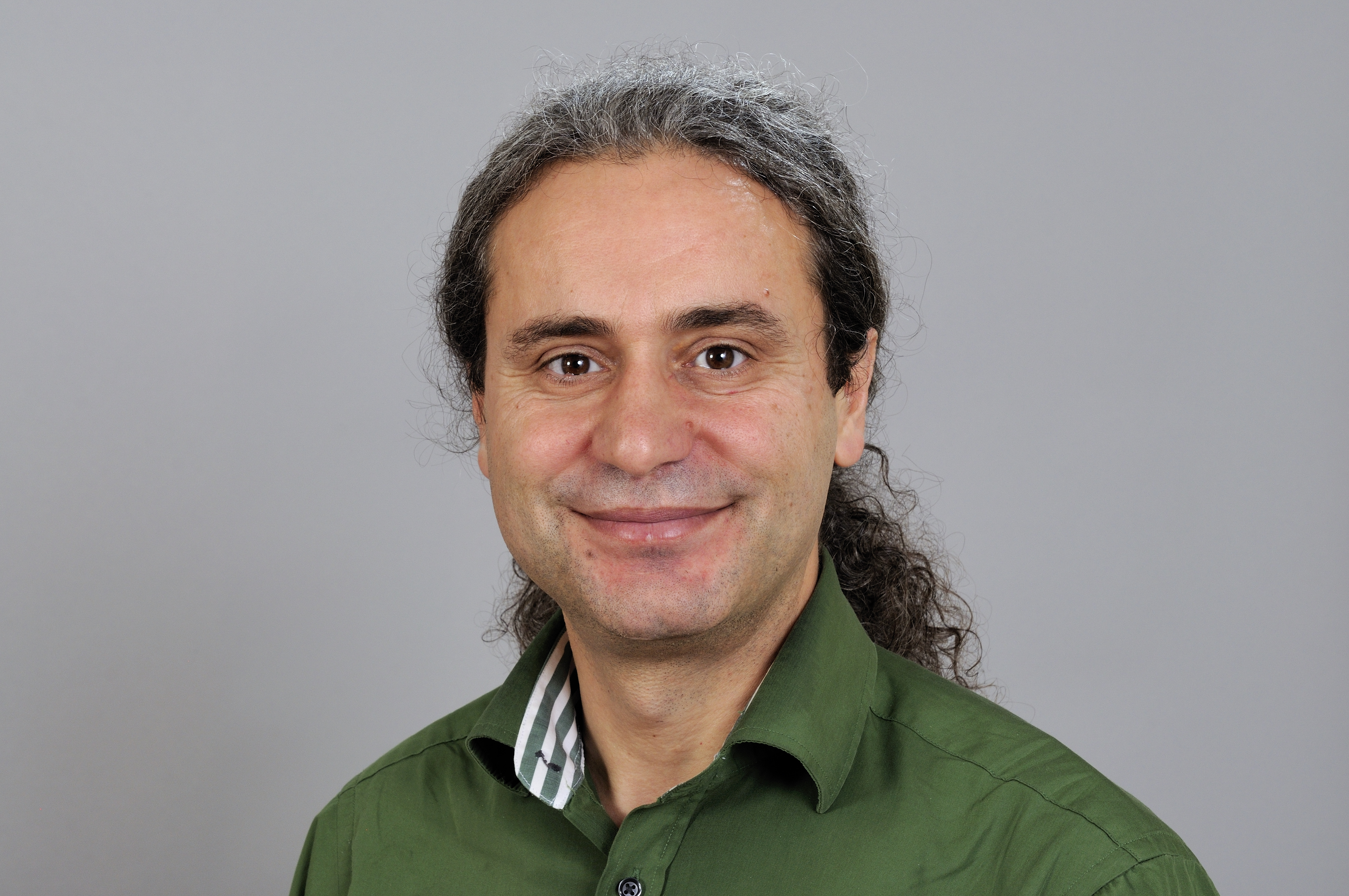
Turgut Altuğ

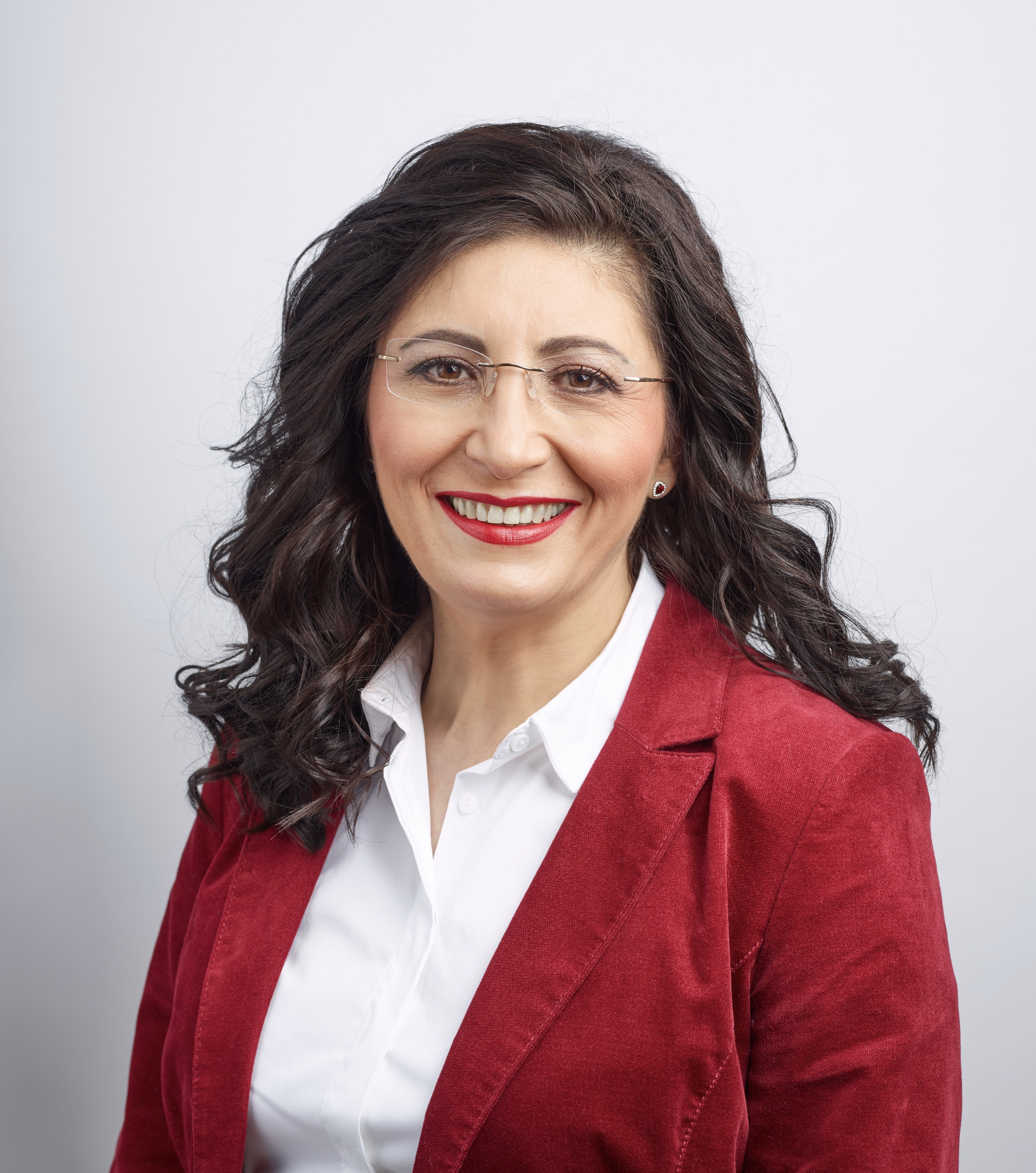
Nezahat Baradari

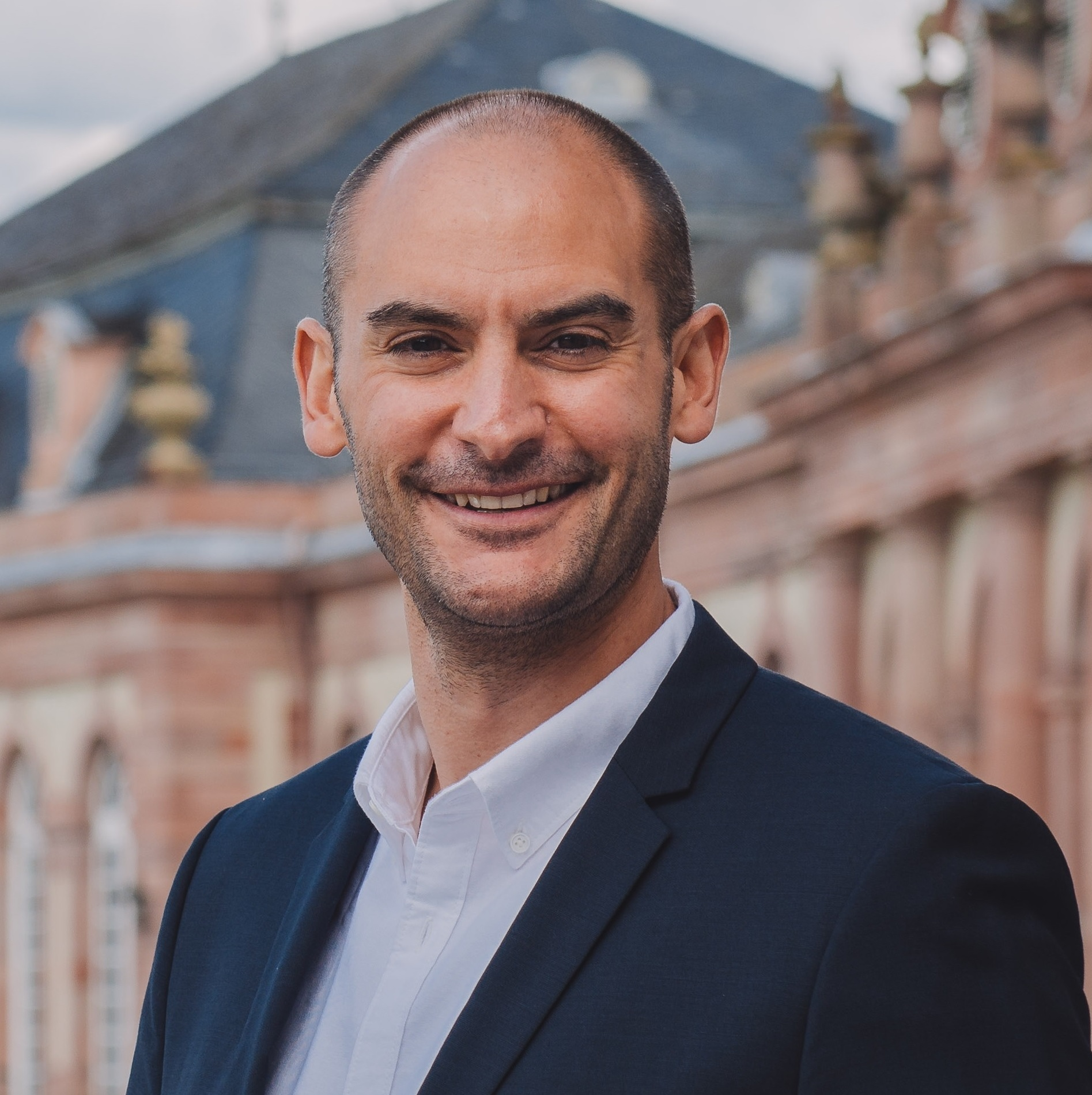
Danyal Bayaz

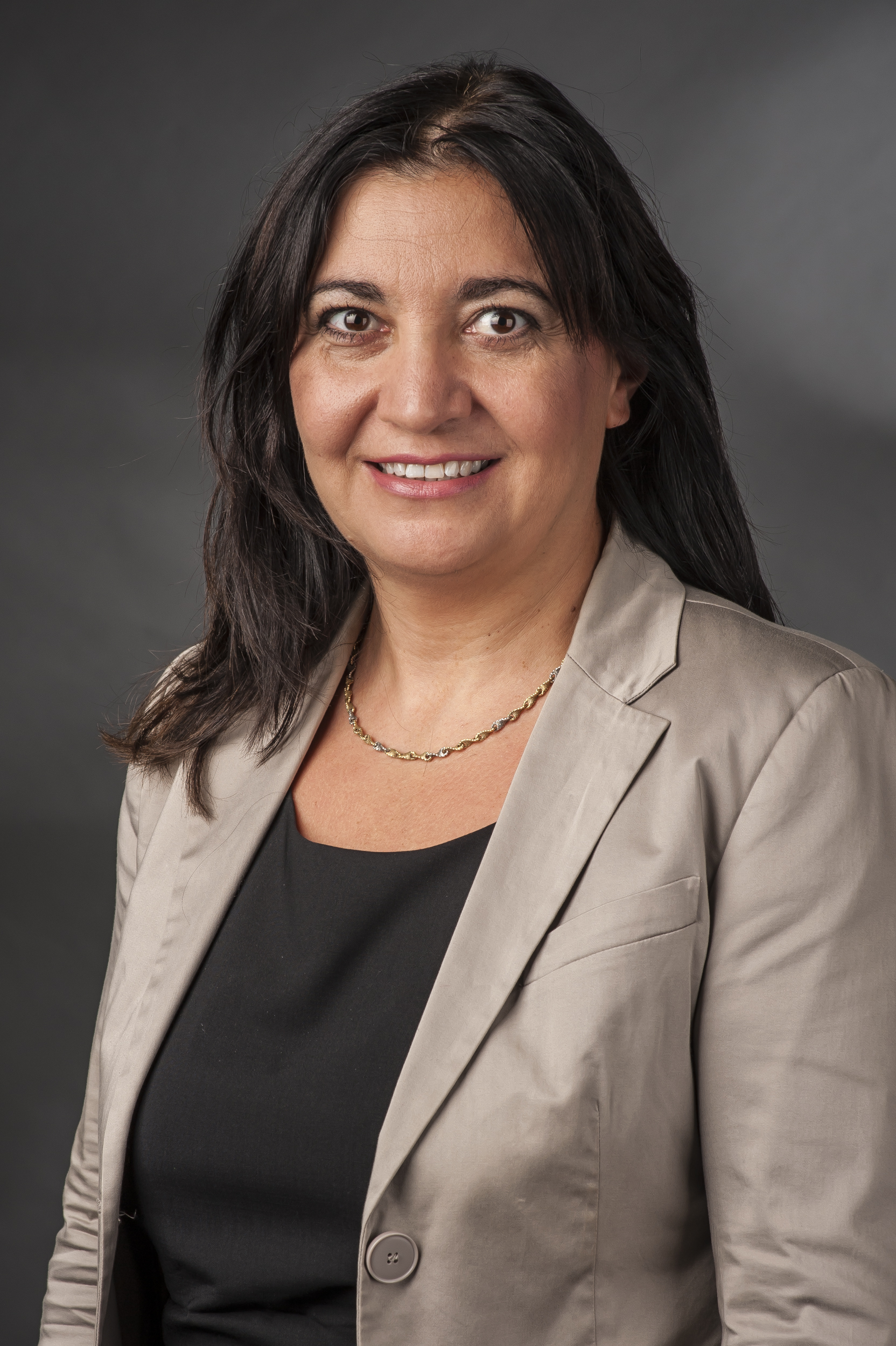
Ekin Deligöz

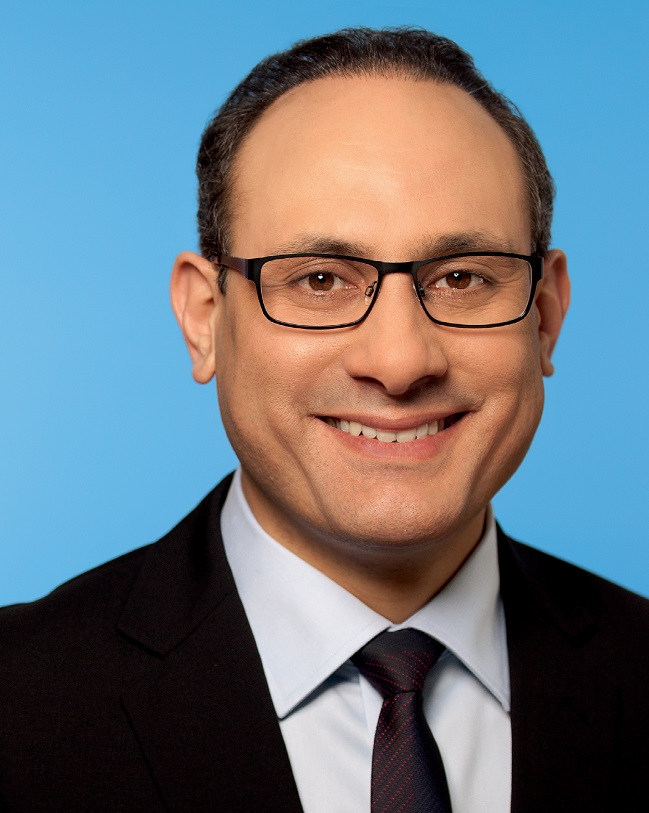
Ismail Ertug

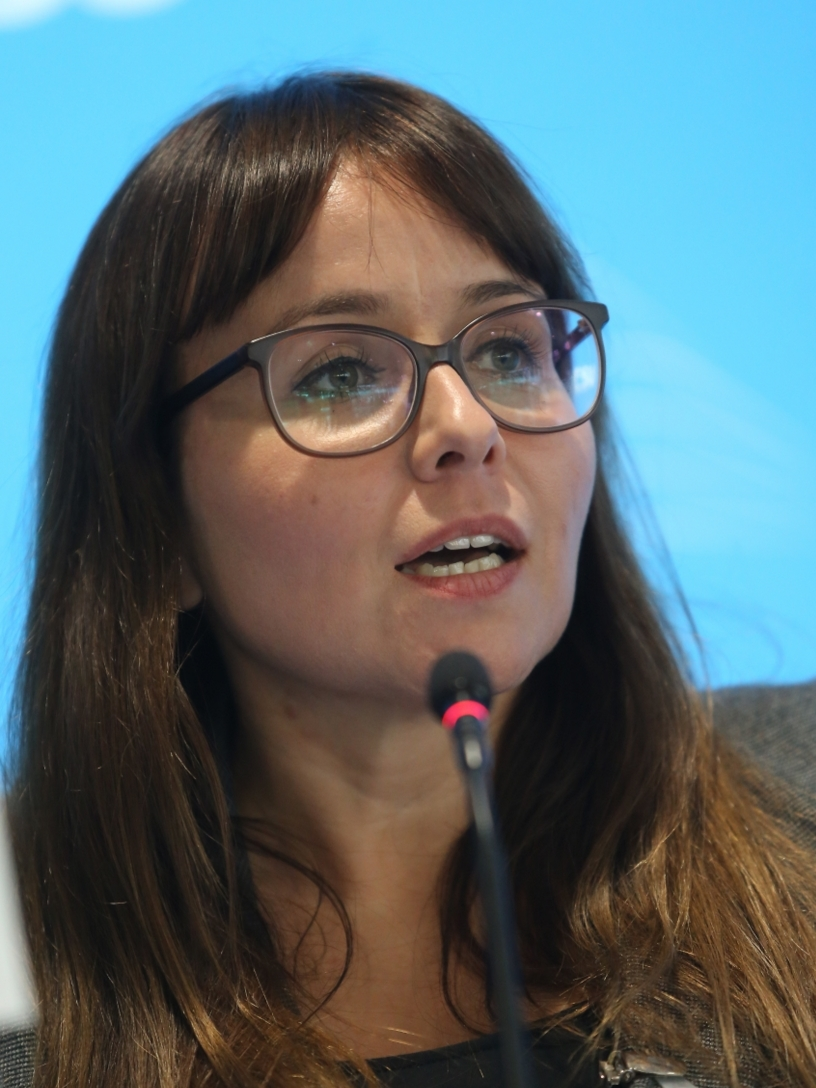
Cemile Giousouf

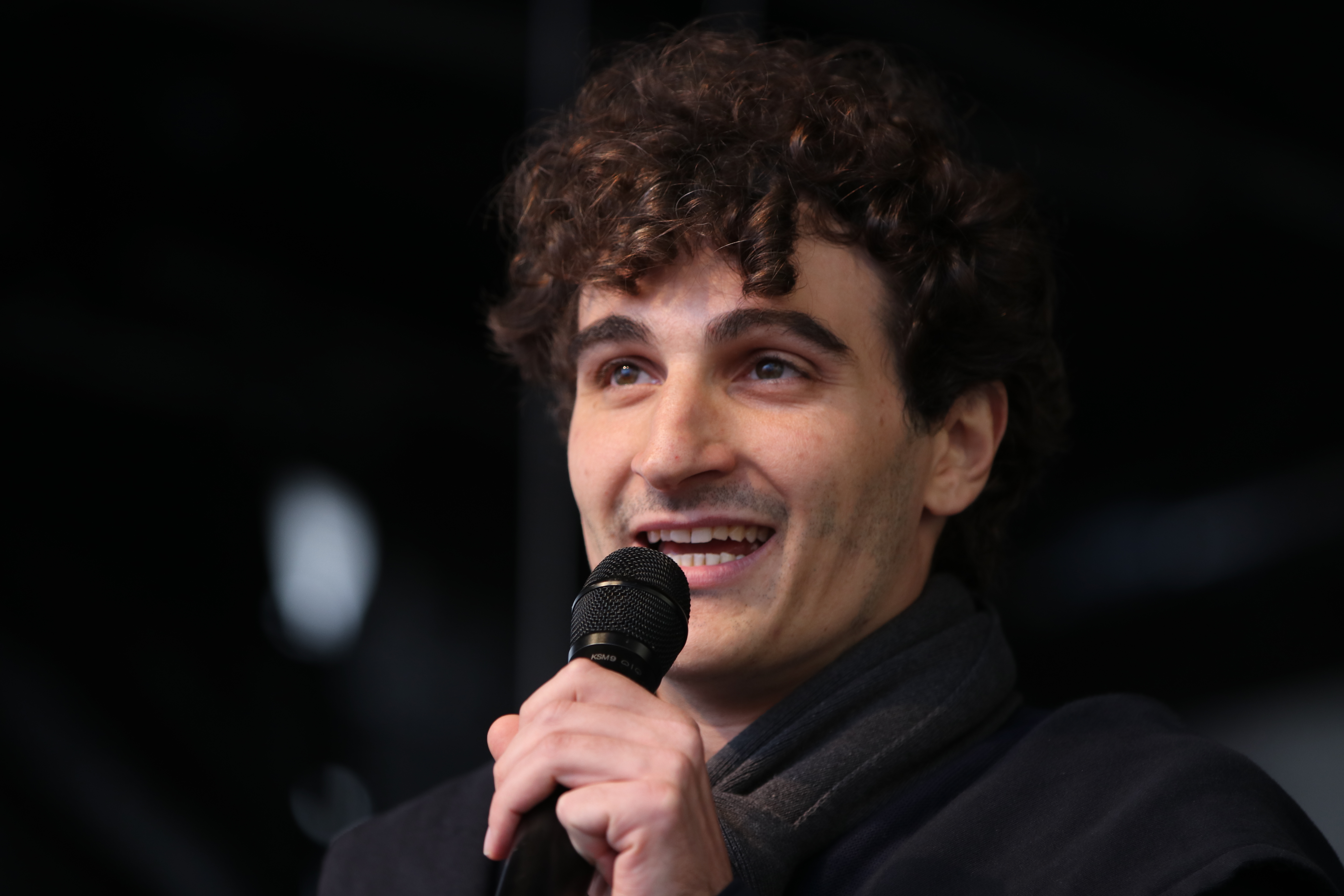
Ates Gürpinar

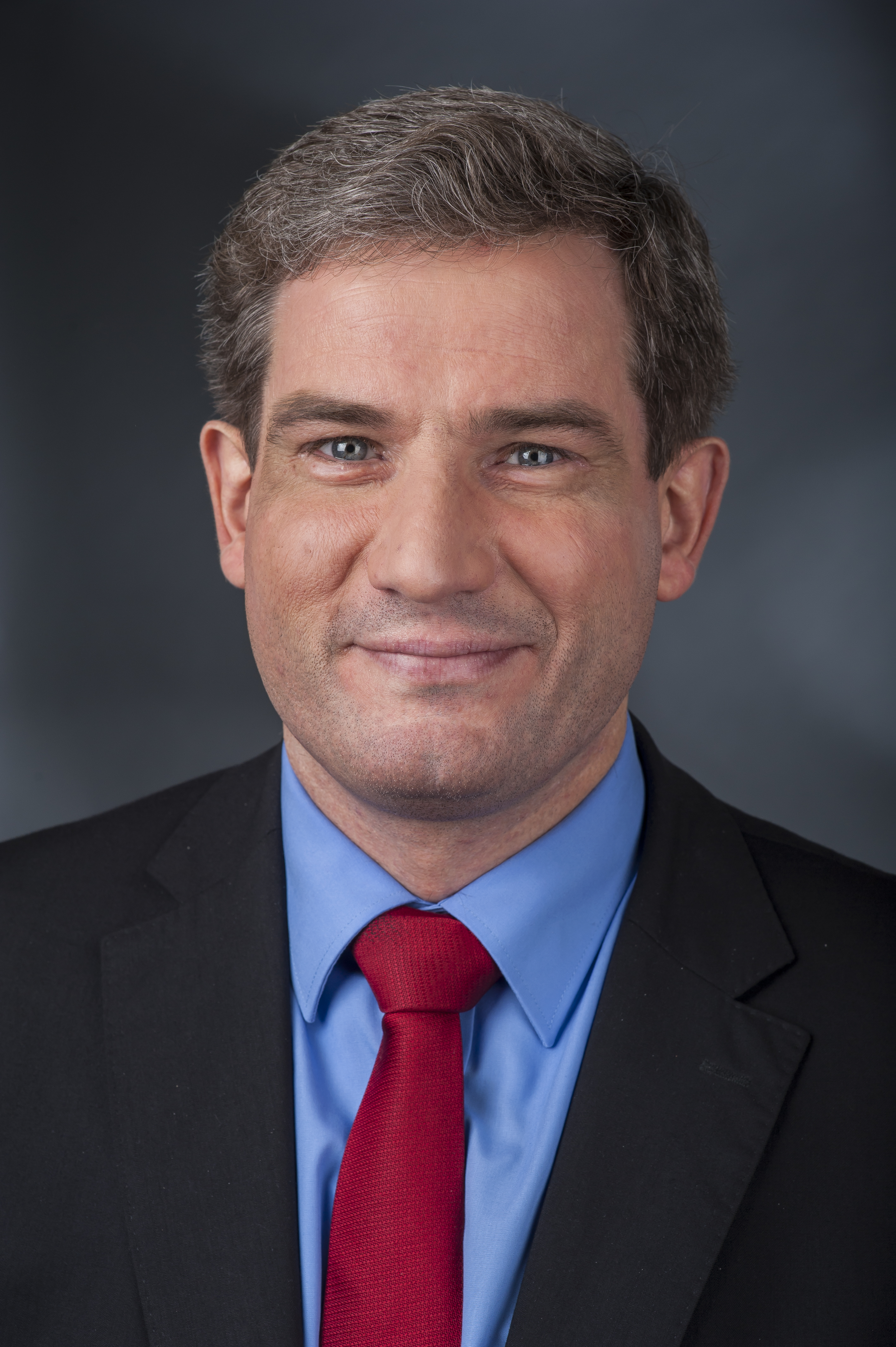
Metin Hakverdi

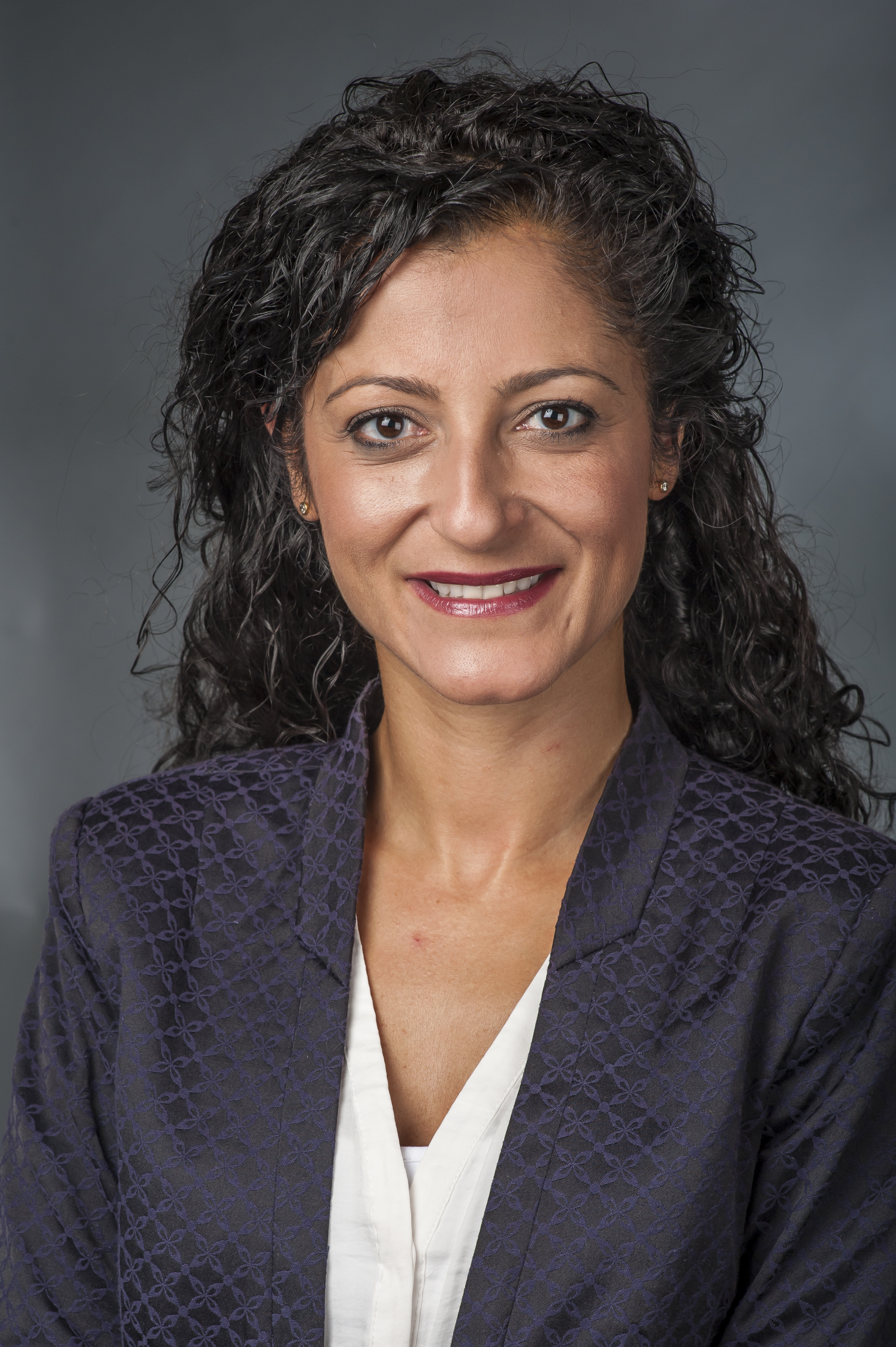
Cansel Kiziltepe

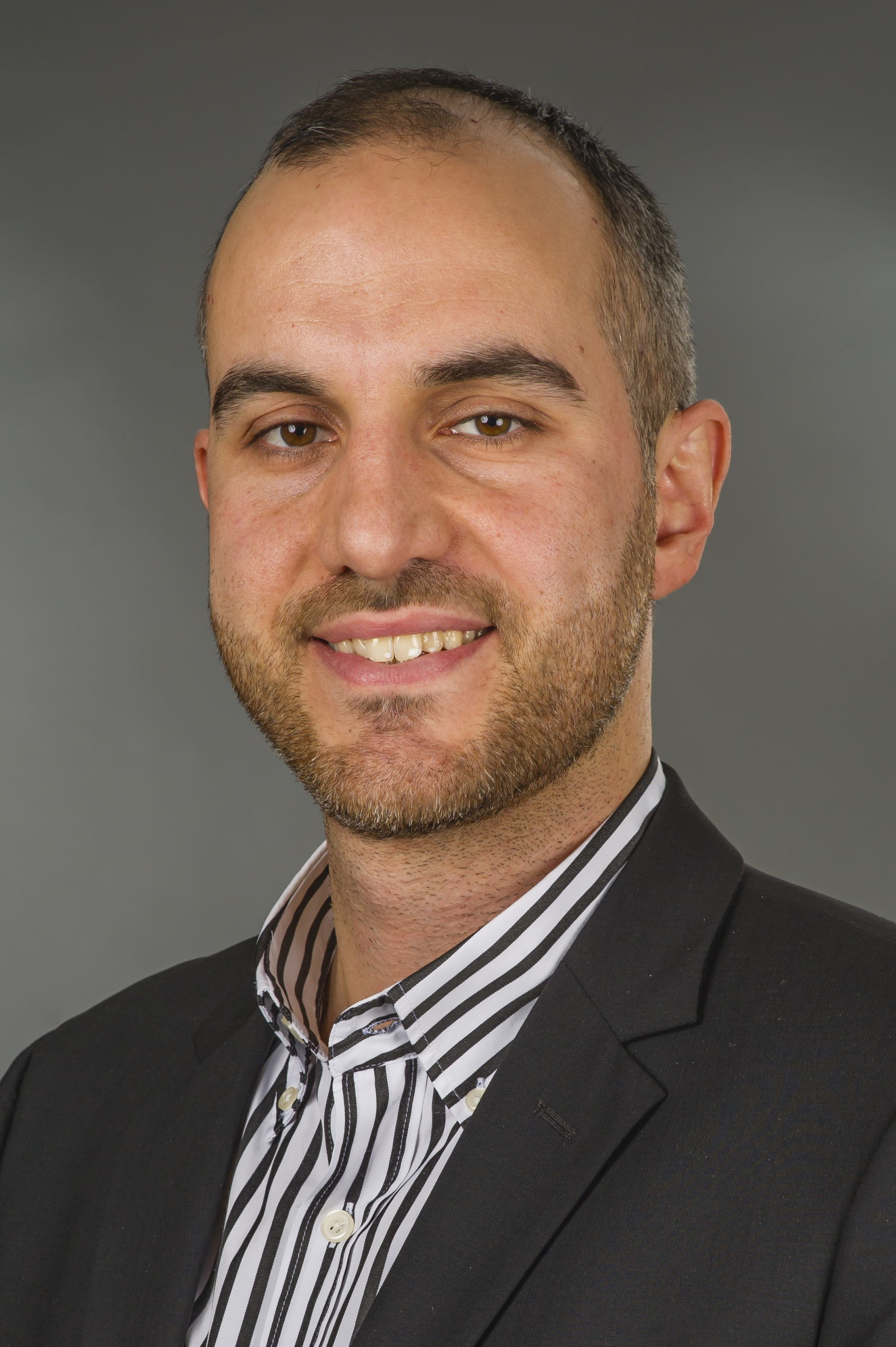
Belit Onay

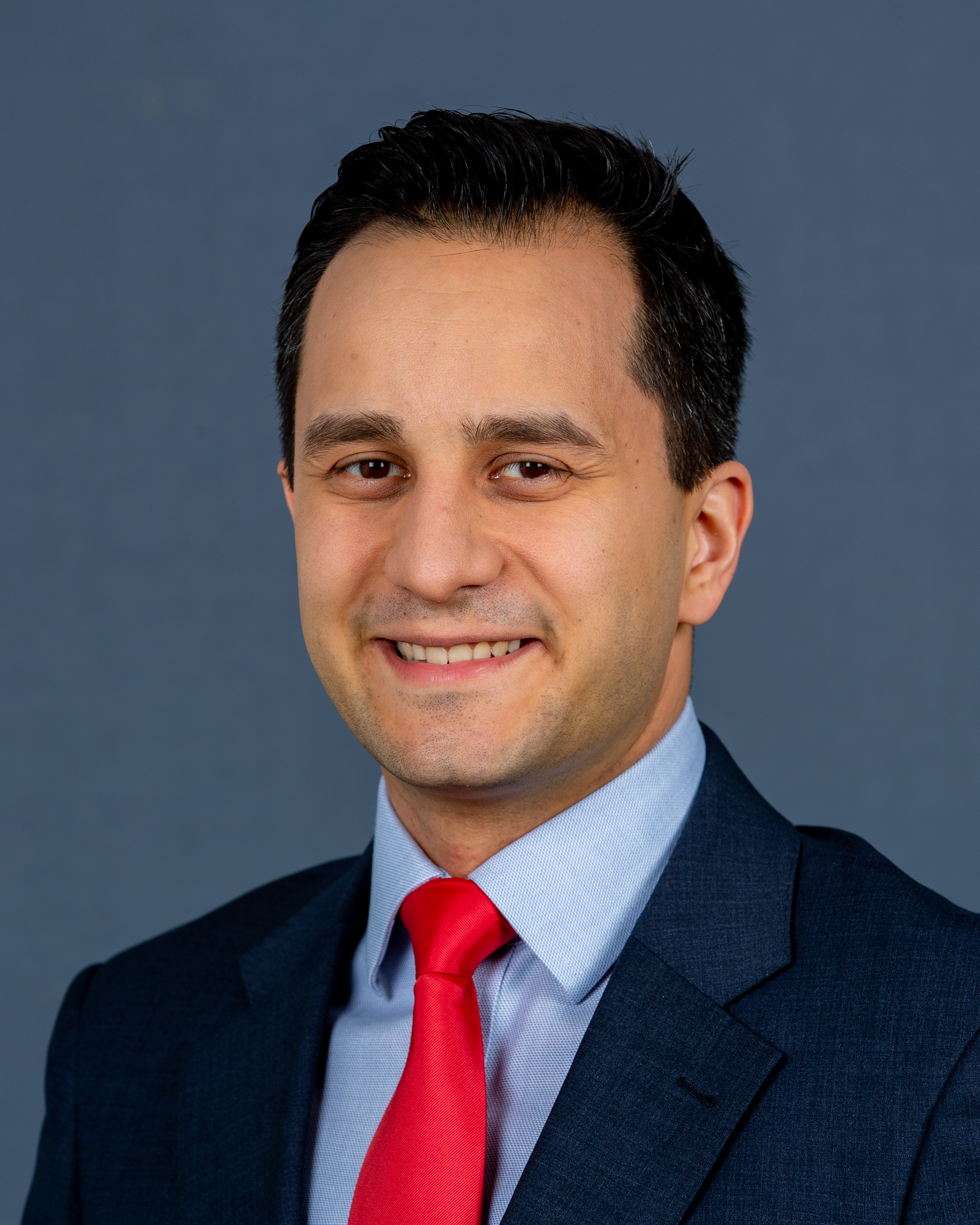
Mahmut Özdemir.

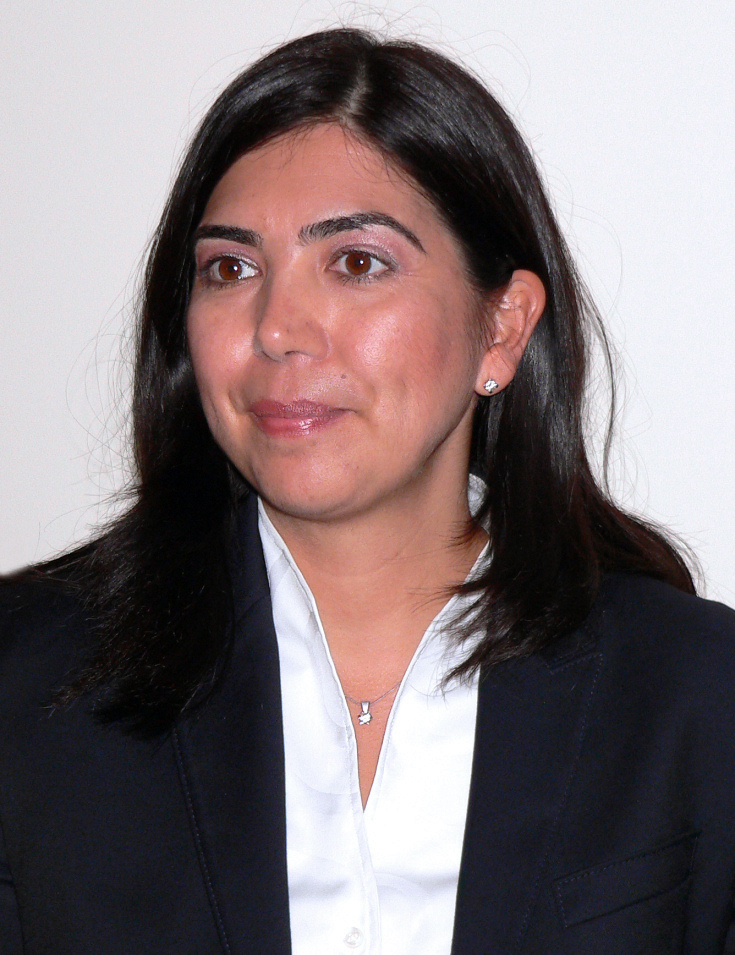
Aygül Özkan

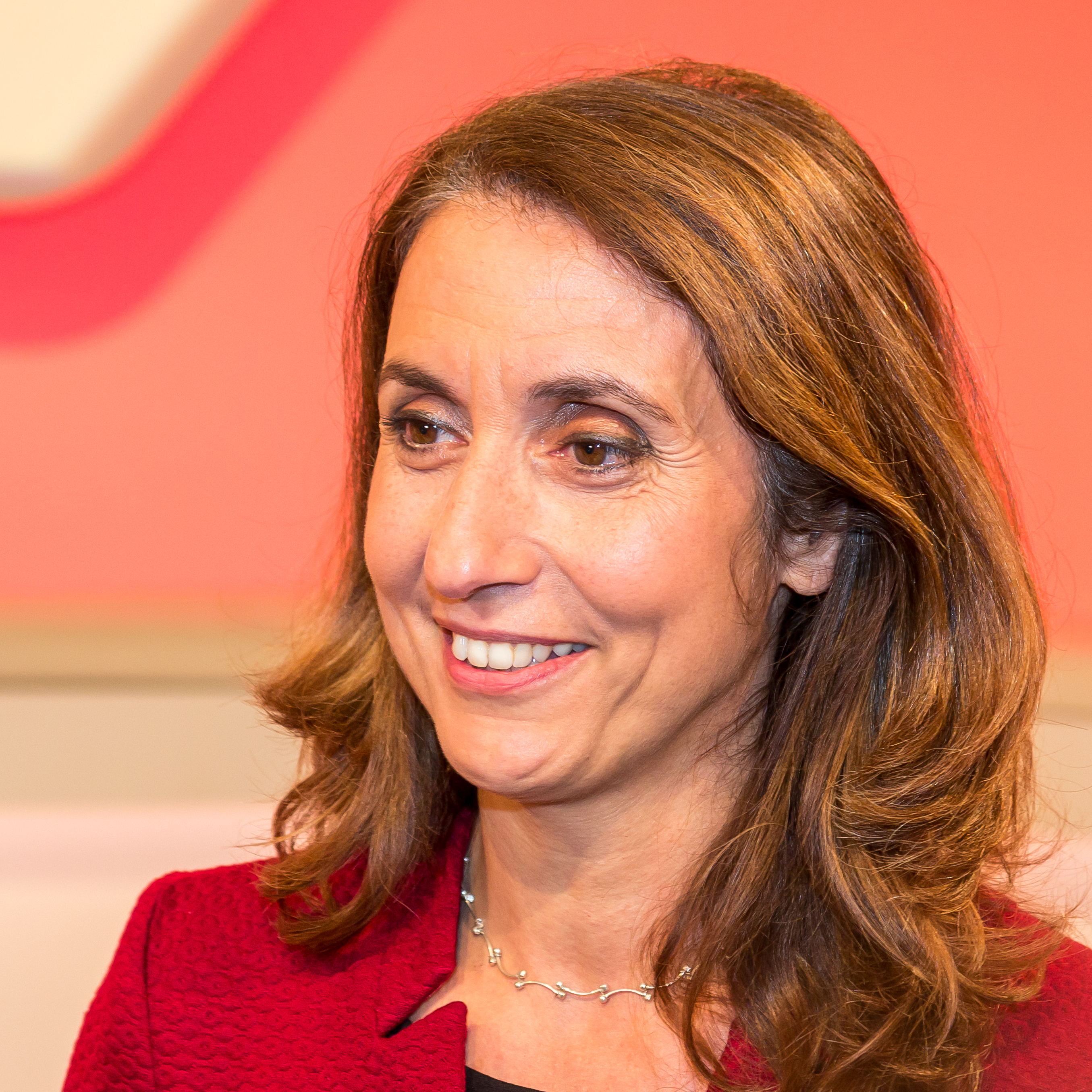
Aydan Özoğuz

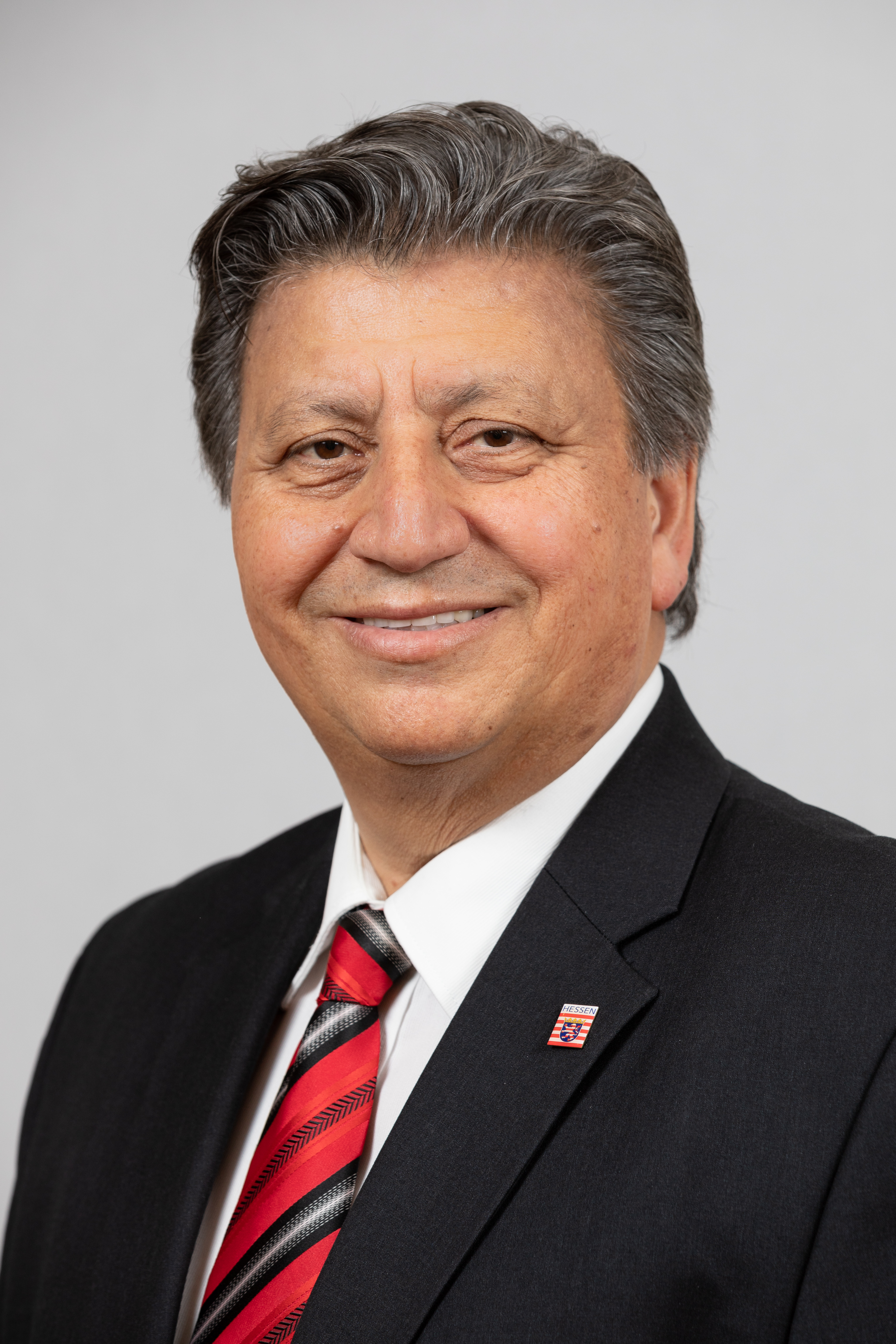
Ismail Tipi

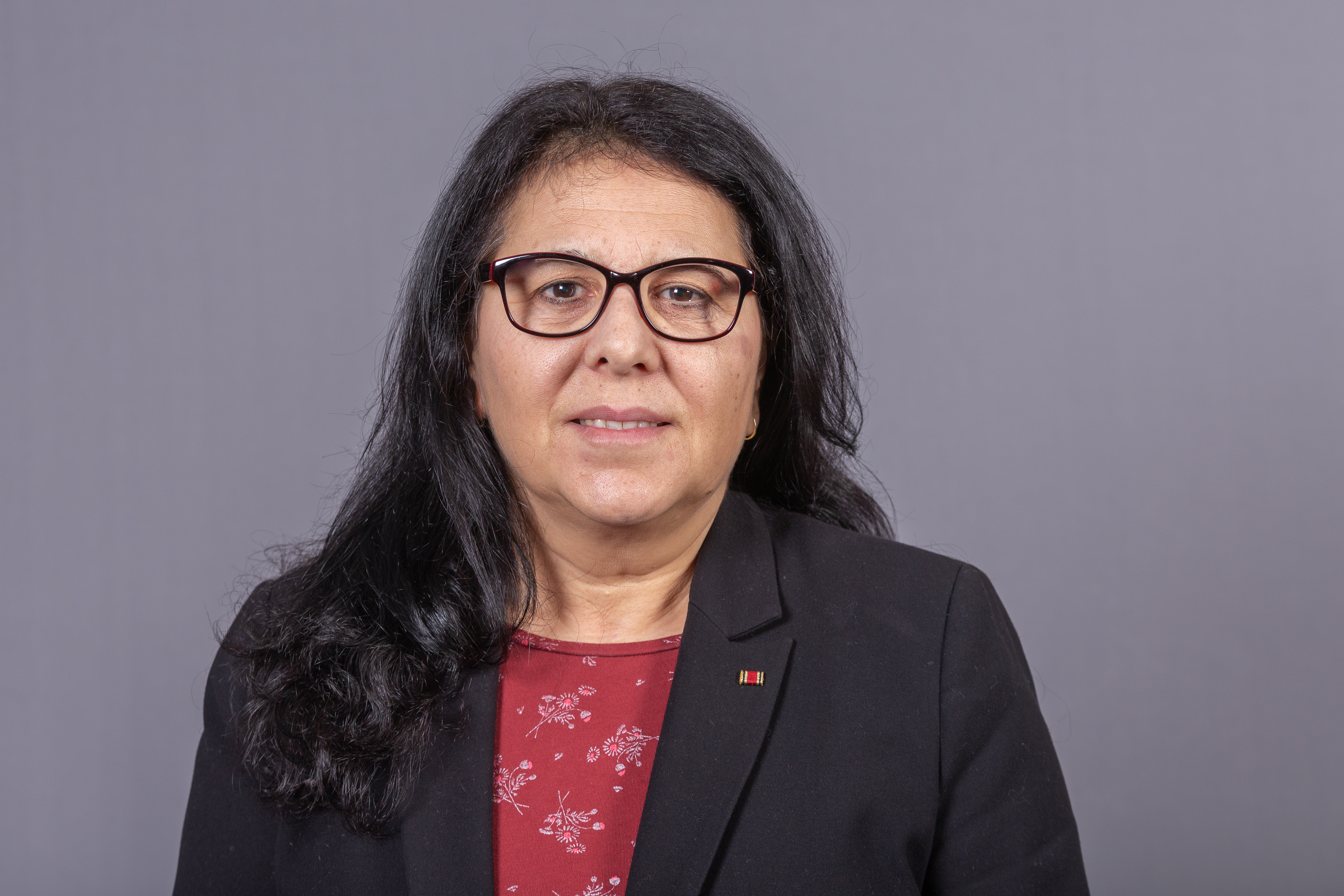
Gülistan Yüksel

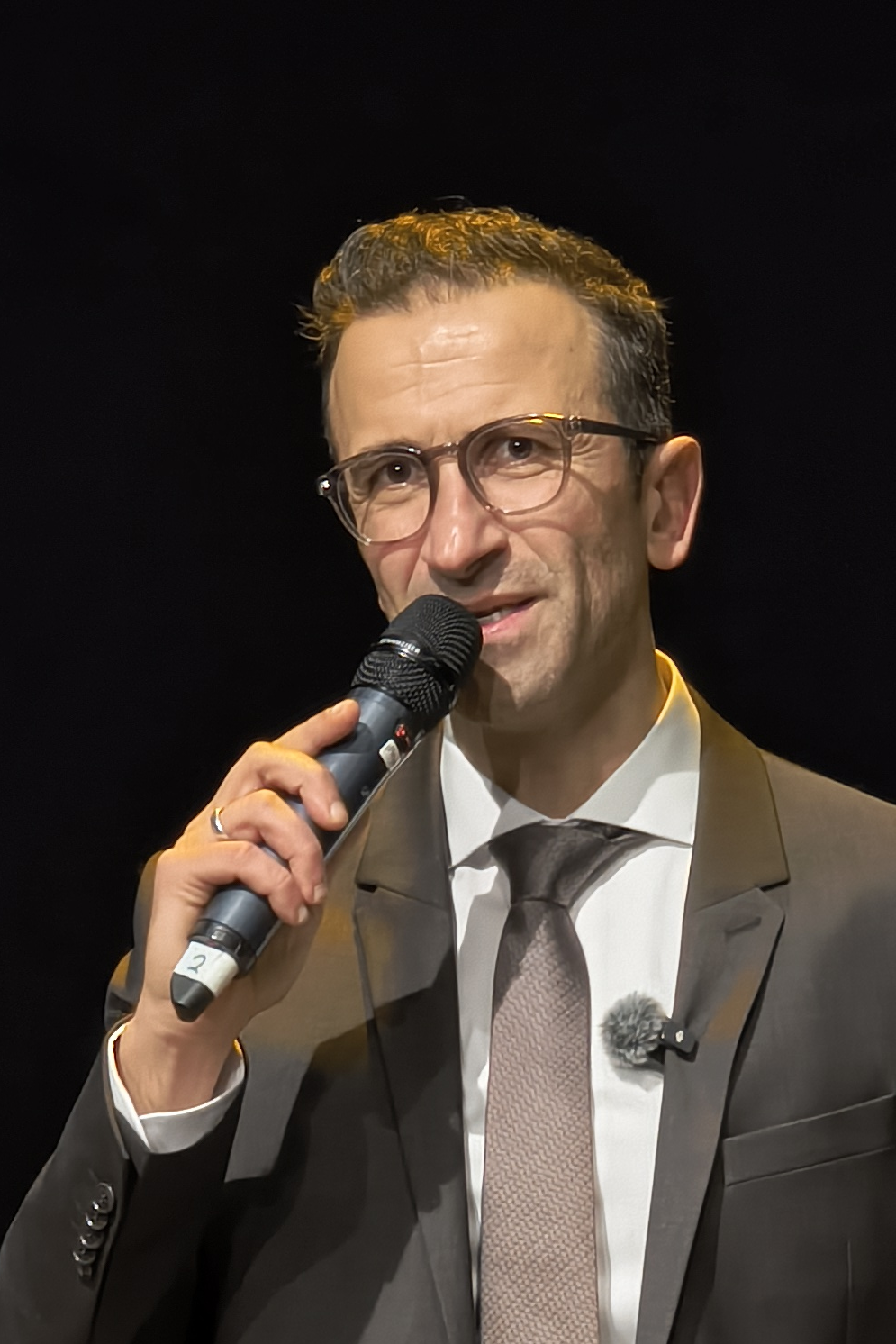
Samet Yilmaz

- Kazım Abacı, member of the SPD
- Mehmet Sirri Acar, member of the SPD
- Lale Akgün, member of the SPD
- Turgut Altuğ, member of the Greens
- Celal Altun, former General Secretary of the Türkische Gemeinde in Deutschland
- Selin Arikoglu, member of the Greens
- Bülent Arslan, member of the CDU
- Ayse Asar, member of the Greens
- Canan Atilgan, political scientist; works for the CDU's Konrad Adenauer Foundation
- Nezahat Baradari, member of the SPD
- Volkan Baran, member of the SPD
- Ali Baş, member of the Greens
- Danyal Bayaz, member of the Greens (Turkish father and German mother)
- İkbal Berber, member of the SPD
- Cem Berk, member of the SPD
- Yaşar Bilgin, member of the CDU; doctor
- Aziz Bozkurt, member of the SPD
- Tuba Bozkurt, member of the Greens
- Cemal Bozoğlu, member of the Greens
- Gönül Bredehorst, member of the SPD
- Ayla Cataltepe, member of the Greens
- Ozan Ceyhun, former member of the Greens and the SPD; MEP (2000–04); Turkish ambassador to Austria (2020–present)
- Ezhar Cezairli, member of the CDU
- Derya Çağlar, member of the SPD
- Murat Çakır, former press spokesman and board member of the WASG
- Selmin Çalışkan, director for Institutional Relations in the Berlin office of the Open Society Foundations
- Bülent Çiftlik, member of the SPD
- Sevim Çelebi-Gottschlich, member of the Greens; the first MP of Turkish origin in a German parliament
- Deniz Çelik (politician), member of the Left; Vice President of the Hamburg Parliament
- Safter Çinar, chairman of the Türkische Gemeinde in Deutschland (2014–present)
- Mehmet Daimagüler, former member of the FDP; lawyer
- Ekin Deligöz, member of the Greens
- Hakan Demir (politician), member of the SPD
- Emine Demirbüken-Wegner, member of the CDU
- Filiz Demirel, member of the Greens
- Sina Aylin Demirhan, member of the Greens
- Sülmez Doğan, member of the Greens
- Mahmut Erdem, member of the Greens
- Nese Erikli, member of the Greens
- Mustafa Erkan, former member of the SPD and current member of the AKP
- Engin Eroglu, Chairman of the Free Voters Hesse and the vice-chairman of Free Voters; MEP (2019–present)
- Ismail Ertug, member of the SPD; MEP (2009–present)
- Elif Eralp, German politician
- Zübeyde Feldmann, First Lady of Frankfurt; married to Peter Feldmann who is the Mayor of Frankfurt-am-Main
- Cemile Giousouf, member of the CDU (Turkish Western Thracian origin)
- Murat Gözay, member of the Greens; deputy chairman of the Türkische Gemeinde Hamburg und Umgebung (TGH)
- Nebahat Güçlü, former member of the Greens and current member of the SPD
- Serap Güler, member of the CDU
- Lena Saniye Güngör, member of the Left
- Mustafa Güngör (politician), member of the SPD
- Sanem Güngör, member of the SPD
- Aydin Gürlevik, member of the SPD
- Ates Gürpinar, deputy chairmen of the Left (Turkish father and German mother)
- Metin Hakverdi, member of the SPD
- Derviş Hızarcı, anti-discrimination officer of the Berlin Senate Department for Education, Youth and Family
- Timur Husein, member of the CDU (Turkish Macedonian father and Croatian mother)
- Uğur Işılak, member of the AKP
- Ahmet İyidirli, member of the SPD
- Dilek Kalayci, member of the SPD
- Macit Karaahmetoǧlu, member of the SPD
- Kadriye Karcı, member of the Left
- Metin Kaya, member of the Left
- Zülfiye Kaykin, member of the SPD
- Tayfun Keltek, member of the SPD
- Hakkı Keskin, member of the Left; former chairman of the Türkische Gemeinde in Deutschland (1995–2005)
- Gül Keskinler, member of the CDU
- Akif Çağatay Kılıç, member of the AKP
- Memet Kılıç, member of the Greens
- Cansel Kızıltepe, member of the SPD
- Alptekin Kirci, member of the SPD (Turkish father and German mother)
- Kenan Kolat, member of the SPD; former chairman of the Türkische Gemeinde in Deutschland (2005–14)
- Elvan Korkmaz, member of the SPD
- Aylin Kotil, member of the CHP (Turkish father and German mother)
- Deniz Kurku, member of the SPD
- Serpil Midyatli, member of the SPD
- Özcan Mutlu, member of the Greens
- Belit Onay, member of the Greens; Mayor of Hanover (2019–present)
- Leyla Onur, member of the SPD; MEP (1989–94)
- Arif Babür Ordu, former member of the FDP; doctor
- Taşkın Oymacı, former migrant advisor
- Vural Öger, member of the SPD; MEP (2004–09)
- Baris Önes, member of the SPD
- Bilkay Öney, member of the SPD
- Ertekin Özcan, former chairman of the Türkische Gemeinde in Deutschland (1994–95)
- Timur Özcan, member of the SPD; Mayor of Walzbachtal (2019–present)
- Turhal Özdal, member of the Greens
- Cem Özdemir, member of the Greens (Turkish mother and Circassian father)
- Mahmut Özdemir, member of the SPD
- Hasan Özen, member of the SPD; awarded the Order of Merit of the Federal Republic of Germany in 1994
- Handan Özgüven, member of the SPD
- İlkin Özışık, member of the SPD
- Aygül Özkan, member of the CDU
- Erol Özkaraca, member of the SPD
- Aydan Özoğuz, member of the SPD
- Mustafa Kemal Öztürk, member of the Greens
- Patrick Öztürk, member of the SPD
- Ziya Pir, member of the HDP
- Filiz Polat, member of the Greens
- Yanki Pürsün, member of the FDP
- Ülker Radziwill, member of the SPD
- Melis Sekmen, member of the Greens
- Emin Sükrü Senkal, member of the SPD
- Ali Şimşek, member of the SPD
- Gökay Sofuoglu, member of the SPD; chairman of the Türkische Gemeinde in Deutschland (2014–present)
- Saadet Sönmez, member of the Left
- Azize Tank, member of the Left
- Arif Taşdelen, member of the SPD
- Ismail Tipi, member of the CDU
- Tayfun Tok, member of the Greens
- Fatoş Topaç, member of the Greens
- Serkan Tören, member of the FDP
- Eyfer Tunc, former member of the SPD and current member of the CDU
- Derya Türk-Nachbaur, member of the SPD
- Yusuf Uzundag, member of the Greens
- Arif Ünal, member of the Greens
- Özlem Ünsal, member of the SPD
- Bülend Ürük, spokesman of the ruling CDU/CSU group in the German Bundestag
- Oğuzhan Yazıcı, member of the CDU
- Mustafa Yeneroğlu, member of the DEVA
- Haluk Yildiz, chairman of the Turkish-founded political party BIG
- Güngör Yilmaz, member of the SPD
- Gülistan Yüksel, member of the SPD
- Fatih Zingal, former member of the SPD; deputy chairman of the UID (2013–15)
- Samet Yilmaz, mayor of Kiel

== Religion ==
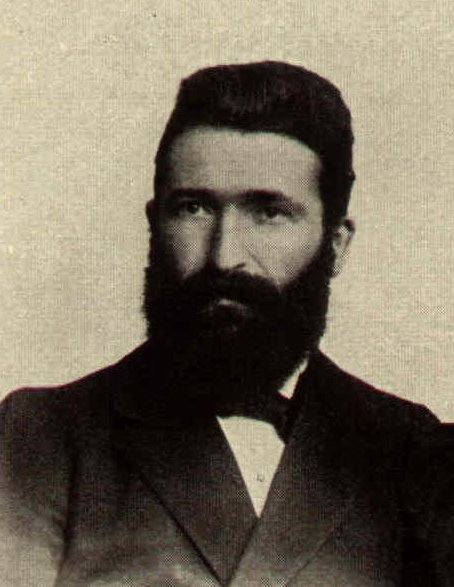
Johannes Avetaranian

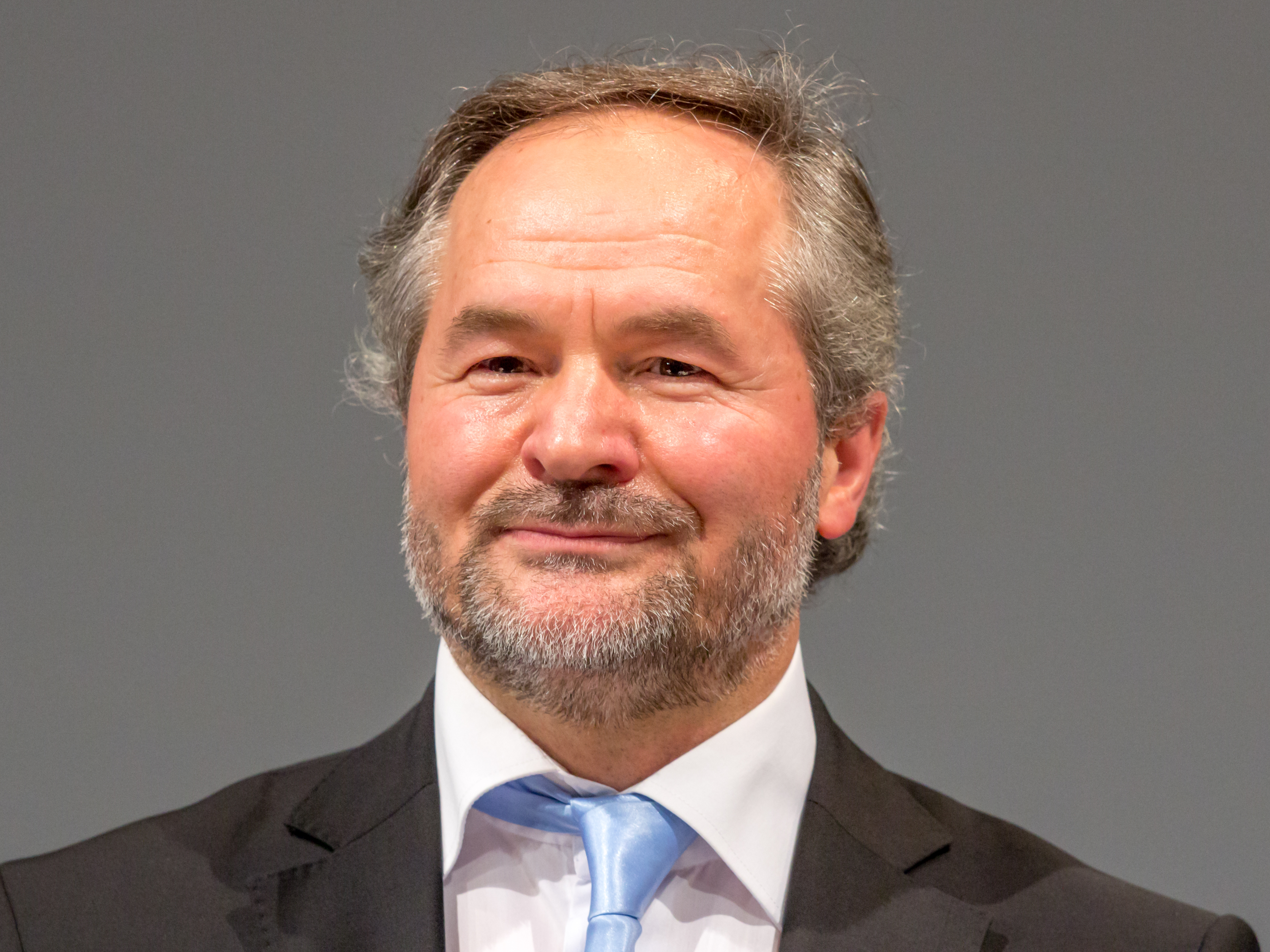
Bekir Alboğa

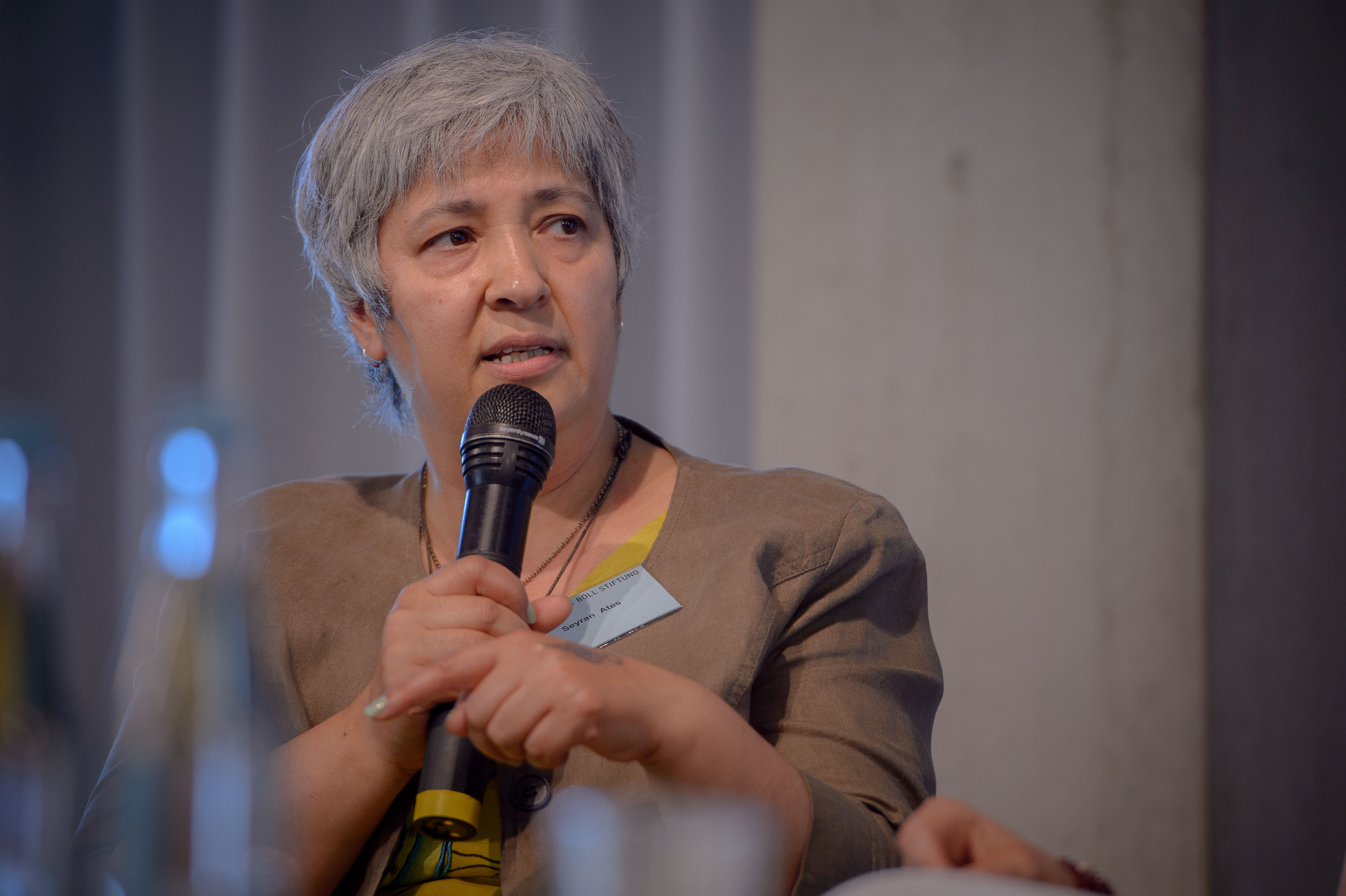
Seyran Ateş

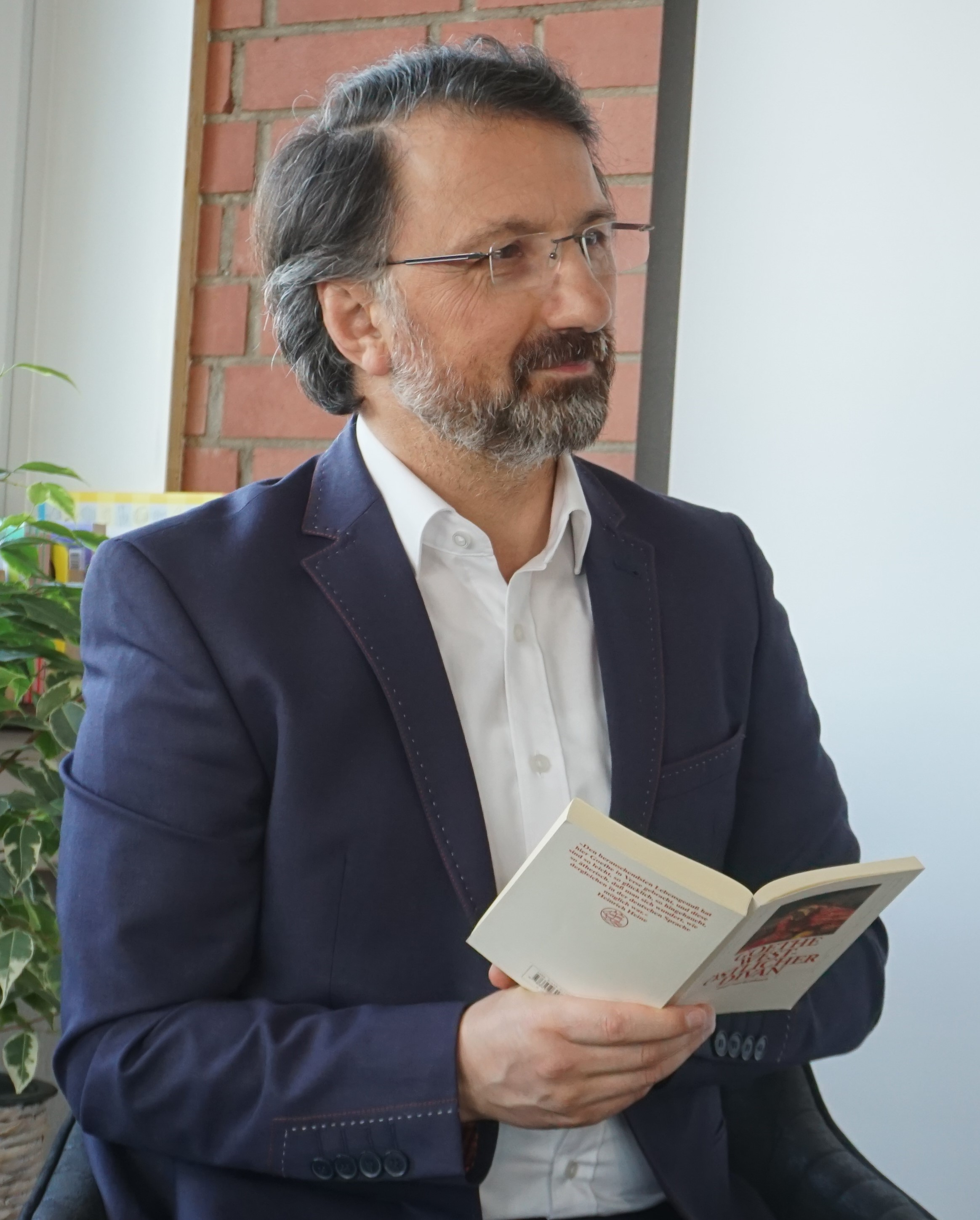
Mustafa Cimşit

- Bekir Alboğa, scholar of Islam; chairman of the Turkish-Islamic Union for Religious Affairs (2012–17)
- Murat Aslanoğlu, former chairman of the Coordinating Council of the Christian-Islamic Dialogue (2003–08)
- Seyran Ateş, lawyer and feminist; founder of the Ibn Rushd-Goethe mosque (Turkish mother and Kurdish father)
- Johannes Avetaranian, was originally a mullah in Turkey who converted from Islam to Christianity
- Ridvan Aydemir, ex-Muslim activist
- Mustafa Cimşit, religious scholar, imam, and co-founder and managing director of the Maimonides Jewish-Muslim educational institute
- Mehmet Sabri Erbakan, chairman of the Islamic Community Millî Görüş (2001–02)
- Mesud Gülbahar, chairman of HASENE International (2012–present)
- Mustafa Özcan Güneşdoğdu, Qur'an reciter
- Eren Güvercin, co-founder of the Alhambra Society
- Antuan Ilgit, Catholic Jesuit priest (converted from Sunni Islam)
- Ercan Karakoyun, chairman of the Dialogue and Education Foundation; co-founder of the House of One - one of the world's first houses of prayer for Islam, Christianity and Judaism
- Burhan Kesici, chairman of the Islamic Council for the Federal Republic of Germany
- Ali Kızılkaya, former chairman of the Islamic Council for the Federal Republic of Germany
- Ayten Kiliçarslan, executive chairwoman and project manager of the "Sozialdienst muslimischer Frauen" (SmF e.V.)
- Erol Pürlü, scholar of Islam and imam; former spokesman of the Coordination Council of Muslims in Germany
- Kazım Türkmen, chairman of the Turkish-Islamic Union for Religious Affairs
- Celal Tüter, chairman of the Islamic Community Millî Görüş (2005–13)
- Mehmet Yıldırım (DITIB), former chairman of the Turkish-Islamic Union for Religious Affairs (DITIB)
- Emel Zeynelabidin, activist in interreligious dialogue
- Bülent Uçar, Islamic scholar

== Royalty ==
- Deniz Kaya, Princess of Bavaria (married to Prince Leopold of Bavaria's youngest son Prince Konstantin Eugen Alexander Max-Emanuel Maria Ludwig Ferdinand Leopold of Bavaria)
- Hande Macit, House of Mecklenburg
- Sema Meray, married to Hubertus, Prinz von Sayn-Wittgenstein-Berleburg
- Alexander Prinz von Sachsen, Head of the Royal House of Saxony (disputed)
- Ra'ad bin Zeid, Head of the Royal Houses of Iraq and Syria (Turkish mother)
- Alexandra Zhukovskaya, daughter of Vasily Andreyevich Zhukovsky and Countess of the Russian Empire (half Turkish and half Russian father and German mother)

== Victims of crime ==
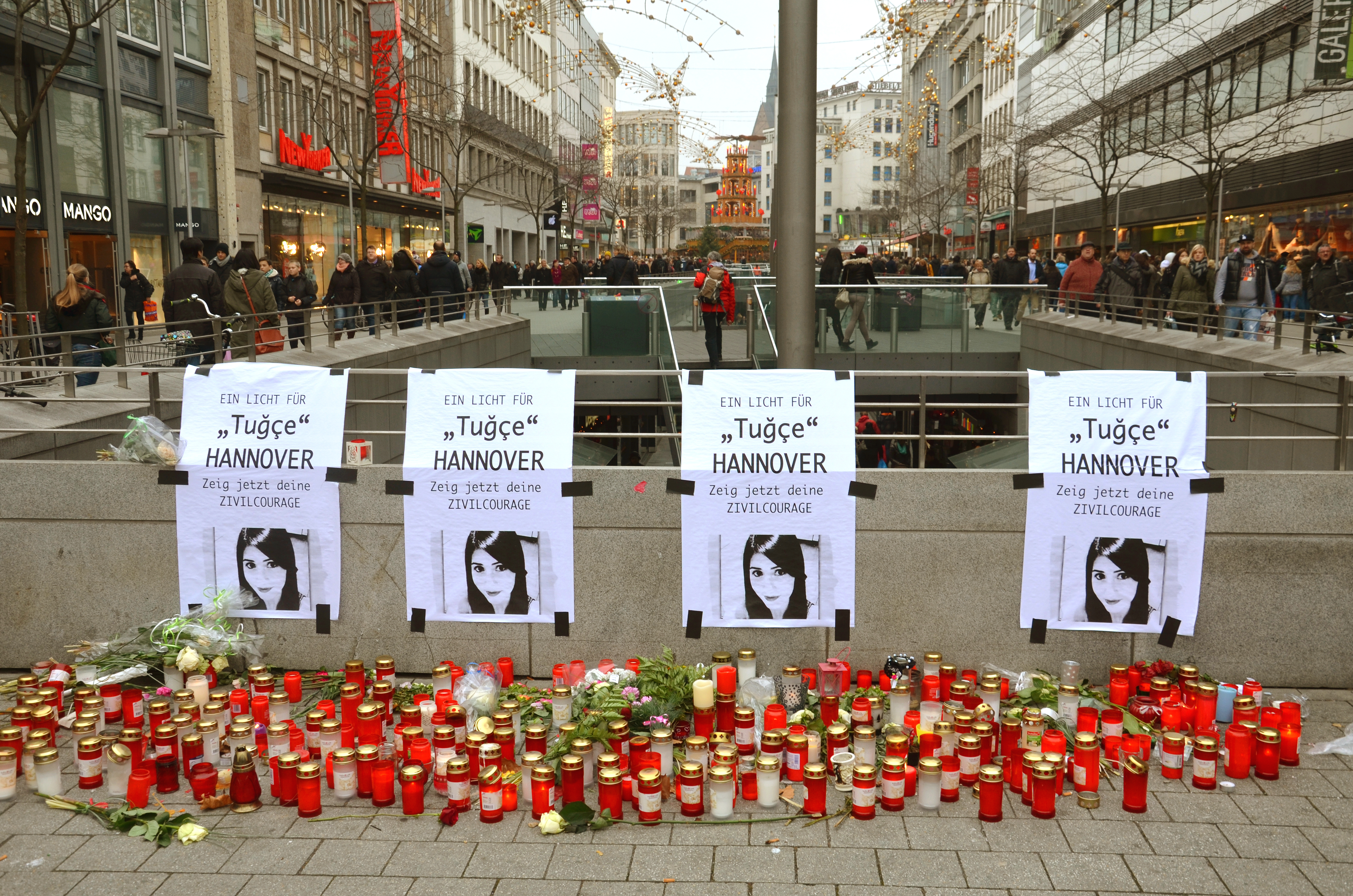
Vigil for Tuğçe Albayrak

- Ramazan Avcı, regarded as one of the first known victims of right-wing extremist violence in the Federal Republic of Germany
- Tuğçe Albayrak, victim murdered in Offenbach am Main after intervening on behalf of two young women who were being harassed by a man
- Burak Bektaş, believed to have been shot by a right-wing extremist
- Sevda Dağ, killed in the 2016 Munich shooting
- Hüseyin Dayıcık, killed in the 2016 Munich shooting (Turkish Western Thracian origin)
- Diren Dede, an exchange student in the United States who was shot dead in Missoula, Montana
- Mustafa Demiral, 56-year-old man attacked by two neo-Nazis; his death led to demonstrations against right-wing extremism
- Mete Ekşi, 19-year-old student attacked by three neo-Nazi German brothers; Ekşi's funeral in November, 1991, was attended by 5,000 people
- Hilal Ercan, missing 10-year-old girl in 1999 which triggered the largest search operation in Hamburg since the Second World War
- Satır family, seven people died and another 23 were injured from the Duisburg arson attack in 1984.
- Susanna Feldmann, a 14-year-old girl who was raped and killed in 2018 in Wiesbaden by an asylum seeker from Iraqi Kurdistan (her father was Turkish and her mother was Jewish-Russian)
- Mevlüde Genç, German ambassador for peace who lost two daughters, two granddaughters and a niece in the 1993 Solingen arson attack
- Habil Kılıç, victim killed during a series of xenophobic murders by the neo-Nazi terrorist group National Socialist Underground (NSU)
- Selçuk Kiliç, killed in the 2016 Munich shooting
- Can Leyla, killed in the 2016 Munich shooting
- Abdurrahim Özüdoğru, victim killed during a series of xenophobic murders by the neo-Nazi terrorist group National Socialist Underground (NSU)
- Enver Şimşek, victim killed during a series of xenophobic murders by the neo-Nazi terrorist group National Socialist Underground (NSU)
- Süleyman Taşköprü, victim killed during a series of xenophobic murders by the neo-Nazi terrorist group National Socialist Underground (NSU)
- Kürşat Timuroğlu, victim of a murder by the PKK terrorist group
- İsmail Yaşar, victim killed during a series of xenophobic murders by the neo-Nazi terrorist group National Socialist Underground (NSU)
- Halit Yozgat, victim killed during a series of xenophobic murders by the neo-Nazi terrorist group National Socialist Underground (NSU)

== "Wall victims" (Maueropfer) at the Berlin Wall ==
- Cengaver Katrancı, an 8-year-old boy who drowned in the river Spree in 1972; West Berlin fire department could not intervene after they unsuccessfully attempted to obtain permission for the entry into the river. An East German fireboat and a tanker were present but did not take the rescue operation.
- Çetin Mert, a 5-year-old boy drowned in the river Spree in 1975; West Berlin police and fire brigade were not allowed to intervene because of the state border running along the bank. Çetin received no help from East Berlin either.

== Others ==
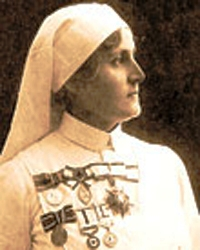
Safiye Ali was a Turkish physician

- Safiye Ali, was a Turkish physician. She was the second female doctor in the Republic of Turkey
- Necati Arabaci, crime boss
- 36 Boys, criminal gang active from 1987 to the mid-1990s
- Fethiye Çakıl, awarded the Order of Merit of the Federal Republic of Germany in 2007 for her commitment to the integration of Turkish women and her commitment to the German Red Cross
- Bahtiyar Duysak, Twitter employee who deactivated Donald Trump's account on November 2, 2017
- Semra Ertan, set herself on fire in protest against racism, specifically, against the treatment of Turks in Germany
- MontanaBlack, largest German gaming live streamer on Twitch (Turkish mother and German father)
- Emrah Tekin, YouTuber
- Black Jackets

== See also ==
- Turks in Germany
- List of German locations named after people and places of Turkish origin
  - Türkenstraße ("Turks Street")
- List of Germans
