= List of German-Turkish authors =

This is a list of Turkish-German authors or German-Turkish authors whose works add to German-Turkish literature. Some are writers for Turkish-German Cinema.

The writers belong to the Turkish group of immigrants in the German language area. Their works are part of Migrant literature and German present literature.

== German language ==
=== A ===
- Taner Akçam
- Doğan Akhanlı
- Fatih Akın
- Bülent Akinci
- Sinan Akkuş
- Yılmaz Arslan
- Django Asül
- Seyran Ateş

=== B ===
- Tevfik Başer
- Habib Bektaş
- Şakir Bilgin

=== C ===
- Sabri Çakır
- Neco Çelik
- Bülent Ceylan
- Zehra Çırak

=== D ===
- Bora Dağtekin
- Güney Dal
- Renan Demirkan

=== K ===
- Yadé Kara
- Suzan Emine Kaube
- Murat Kaya (writer)
- Necla Kelek
- Erden Kıral
- Kemal Kurt
- Nursel Köse

=== L ===
- Nuray Lale

=== M ===
- Erdal Merdan
- Denis Moschitto

=== O ===
- Emine Sevgi Özdamar
- Cem Özdemir

=== P ===
- Akif Pirinçci

=== U ===
- Şadi Üçüncü
- Hüdai Ülker
- İdil Üner

=== Y ===
- Kaya Yanar
- Erol Yesilkaya
- Şerafettin Yıldız

=== Z ===
- Feridun Zaimoğlu

== Turkish language ==
- Başar Sabuncu

== Biographies ==
- Murat Kurnaz

== Literature ==
- Der Migrationsdiskurs deutsch-türkischer Autor/inne/en der neunziger Jahre, in: Grenzüberschreitungen. Hg. von Manfred Durzak und Nilüfer Kuruyazycy, Königshausen & Neumann: Würzburg 2004, S. 71-91.
- Über das Leben in Bitterland : Bibliographie zur türkischen Deutschland-Literatur und zur türkischen Literatur in Deutschland. Zsgest. und mit zahlr. Annot. vers. von Wolfgang Riemann, Harrassowitz: Wiesbaden 1990
