= Marjana Gaponenko =

German writer (born 1981)

- Мар'яна Михайлівна Гапоненко
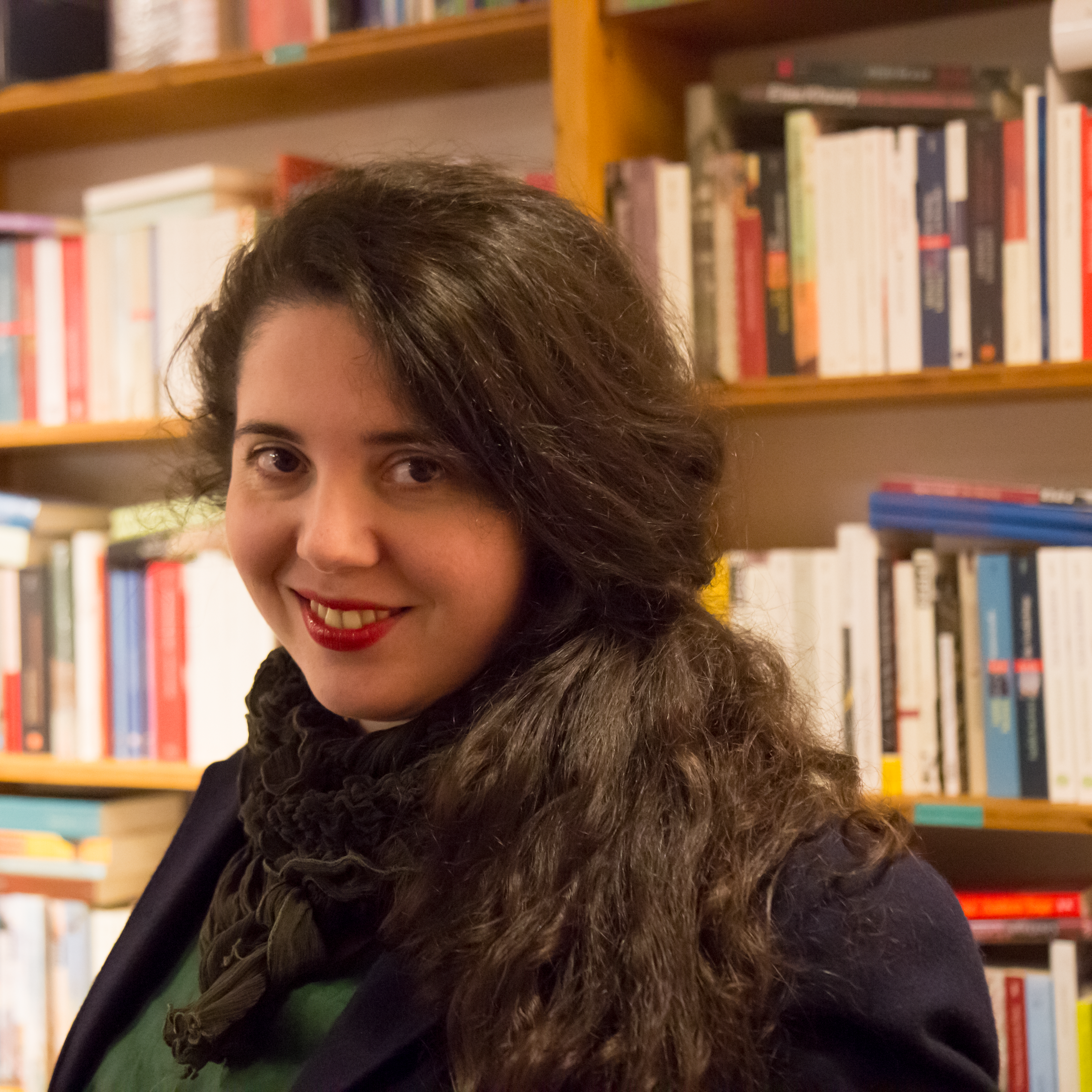
- Gaponenko in 2013
- Born: 6 September 1981 (age 44); Odesa, Ukrainian SSR, Soviet Union
- Education: Odesa University
- Occupation: writer
- Writing career
- Language: German
- Genre: novel

Marjana Michailowna Gaponenko (Ukrainian: Мар'яна Михайлівна Гапоненко, romanized: Mariana Mikhailivna Haponenko; born 6 September 1981) is a German writer born in Odesa, Ukraine.

== Life ==
Marjana Gaponenko spent her childhood and youth in Odesa. After leaving school, she studied German at the Odesa University and started to write poems and publish. In Germany she was initially promoted by Erik Martin in Muschelhaufen, and she became known to a wider circle of readers. In 2000, she made her debut with the poetry collection How tearless knights. In 2001 she was one of the candidates for the title "Author of the Year" magazine Deutsche Sprachwelt. in 2010 published the first novel, Annushka flower, the Residenz Verlag. Poems have been translated into English, French, Italian, Polish, Romanian and Turkish. She is a member of the Author Forum The Golden Fish.

In her novel Who is Martha ? (2012), two old men spend their last days in a posh Vienna Hotel and wait for death. "As amazing as the young [author ] ", Volker Hage wrote in Der Spiegel, "also her novel Jubilee of the creation and its wonders is full of joie de vivre, also when it comes to last things". The Frankfurter Allgemeine Zeitung considers that the author with the work that was awarded the Adelbert von Chamisso Prize, " created with Luka Lewadski a quirky and idiosyncratic character like from a story by Isaac Babel [has] a childish old man, whose last gasp finds against death expression in a language that balances the oscillation of waking and dream, of melancholic nostalgia and hunger for life."

== Works ==
- Wie tränenlose Ritter. Gedichte, 2000, ISBN 3-934852-10-6.
- Tanz vor dem Gewitter. Gedichte, 2001.
- Freund. Gedichte, 2002.
- Prieten (Rumänisch von Daniel Pop), 2003.
- Reise in die Ferne, 2003.
- Die Löwenschule. Eine wahre Geschichte für Kinder und Erwachsene, 2008, ISBN 978-3-940336-01-9.
- Nachtflug. Gedichte, 2007, ISBN 978-3-940336-00-2.
- Annuschka Blume. Roman, 2010, ISBN 978-3-7017-1544-2.
- Wer ist Martha?. Roman. Suhrkamp, Berlin 2012, ISBN 978-3-518-42315-8.
  - Marjana Gaponenko (15 September 2014). Who Is Martha?. New Vessel Press. ISBN 978-1-939931-17-7.
- Strohhalm in Luzifers Schweif. Erzählungen, edition miromente, 2015, ISBN 978-3-200-03806-6.

== Anthologies ==
- Breuer, Theo (2003). Nord West Süd Ost (in German). Sistig/Eifel: Edition YE. ISBN 978-3-87512-192-6.
- Egger, Daniela (2008). Austern im Schnee und andere Sommergeschichten (in German). Hohenems Wien: Bucher. ISBN 978-3-902612-60-1.
- Braun, Michael (2008). Deutschlandfunk-Lyrikkalender 2009 (in German). Verlag Das Wunderhorn. ISBN 978-3-88423-300-9.
- Buchwald, Christoph; Wolf, Uljana (2009). Jahrbuch der Lyrik 2009 (in German). ISBN 978-3-10-009655-5.
- Kutsch, Axel (2010). Versnetze (in German). Weilerswist: Liebe. ISBN 978-3-941037-56-4.

== Awards ==
- 2001: Autor des Jahres 2001 (Deutsche Sprachwelt)
- 2001: Literaturstipendium des Künstlerdorf Schöppingen
- 2009: Frau Ava Literaturpreis
- 2013: Adelbert-von-Chamisso-Preis
- 2013 Literaturpreis Alpha

== See also ==
- Sana Krasikov
- Andriy Meronyk
- Svitlana Matviyenko
