= Sherko Fatah =

Iraqi-Kurdish German writer (born 1964)

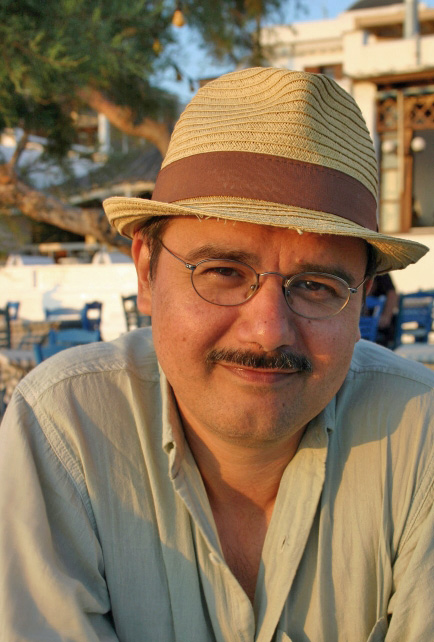
- Sherko Fatah in 2013
- Born: 28 November 1964 (age 61); East Berlin, East Germany
- Occupation: Writer
- Writing career
- Language: Deutsch
- Period: 21st century CE
- Notable awards: Adelbert von Chamisso Prize

Sherko Fatah (Sorani Kurdish: شێرکۆ فەتاح) is a German writer of descent from Iraqi Kurdistan. A novelist, his stories often address the violence in the Middle East, especially in Kurdish areas. Fatah has won several awards for his contributions to German literature, including the Adelbert von Chamisso Prize.

== Life ==
Born in East Berlin on 28 November 1964 to an Iraqi-Kurdish father, Sherko Fatah studied philosophy and art history in West Berlin before he completed his studies with a master's degree in philosophical hermeneutics. Today, Sherko Fatah lives in Berlin as a freelance writer, while also being a member of the PEN Centre Germany. He is married as well.

== Works ==
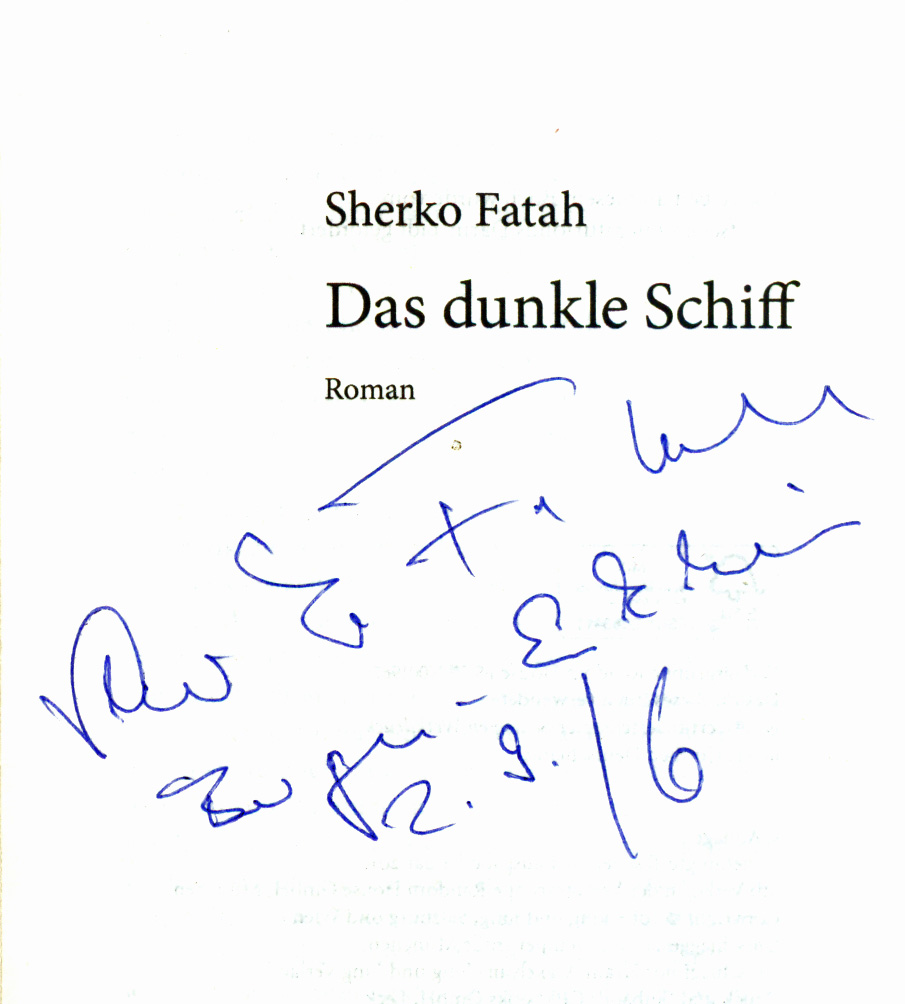
Sherko Fatah's autograph on a copy of Das dunkle Schiff (2008)

Sherko Fatah's novels touch on topics based on the violent conflicts in the Kurdish parts of Iraq, Iran and Turkey, including the genocidal attacks against Kurdish people by the Ba'athist regime of Saddam Hussein.

=== Novels ===
- Im Grenzland (2001)
- Donnie (2002)
- Onkelchen (2004)
- Das dunkle Schiff (2008) later translated into English by Martin Chalmers (2015)
- Ein weißes Land (2011)
- Der letzte Ort (2014)
- Schwarzer September (2019)
- Der große Wunsch (2023)

=== Academic work ===
Fatah contributed to parts of the book and journal Die neue Weltliteratur und ihre großen Erzähler in 2014 under direction of Austrian cultural commentator Sigrid Löffler.

== Reception ==
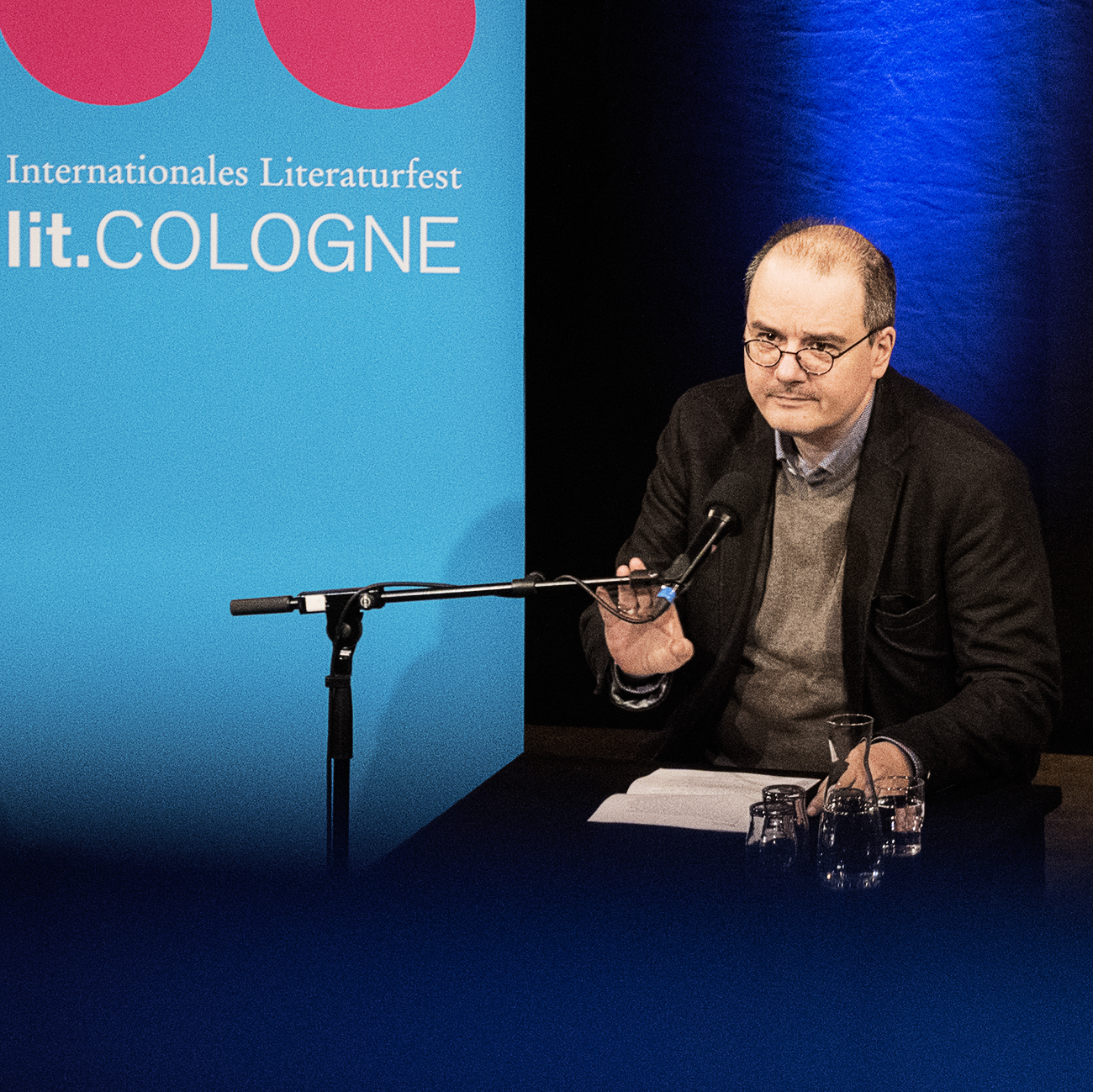
Sherko Fatah at the Internationales Literaturfest lit.COLOGNE, a German literature festival

In 2005, the Lire literary magazine named Sherko Fatah in their list 50 Writers of Tomorrow. Fatah's novel The Dark Ship was also adapted into a radio play which was broadcast on the Norddeutscher Rundfunk.

=== Awards ===
- Stadtschreiber von Bergen –2017
- Adelbert von Chamisso Prize – 2019

=== Book awards ===
- Aspekte-Literaturpreis – 2001
- Hilde-Domin-Preis für Literatur im Exil – 2007
- Shortlist of the German Book Prize – 2008
