= Elazar Benyoëtz =

Israeli writer

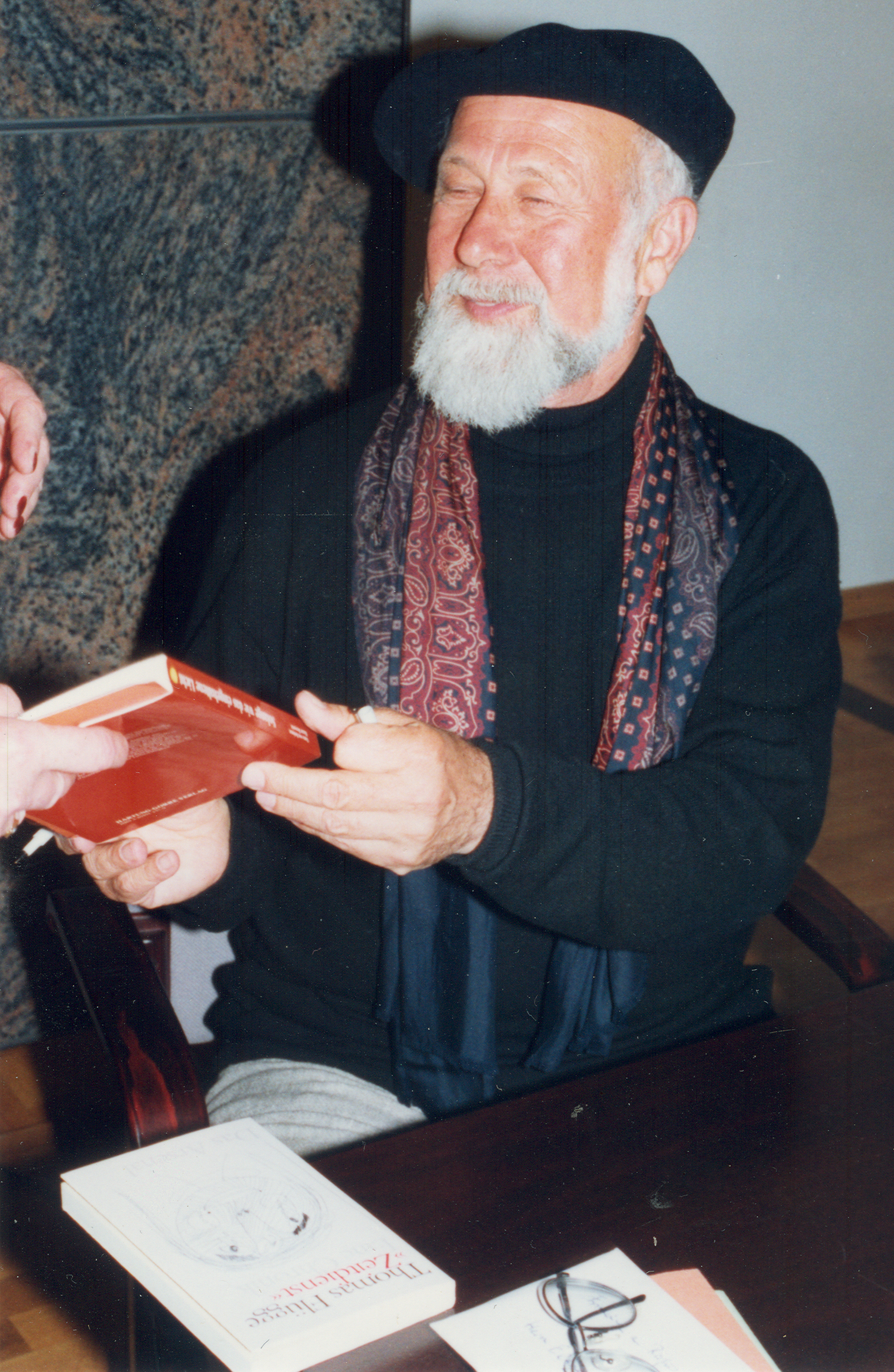
Elazar Benyoëtz Awarded Federal Order of Merit

Elazar Benyoëtz (born in 1937 in Wiener Neustadt, Austria) is an Israeli writer. He was born in Wiener Neustadt to a family of Austrian Jews. In 1939, the family emigrated to Israel, where he grew up speaking the Hebrew language. His first volume of poetry was published in 1957, and Benyoëtz has lived as a freelance writer ever since. In 1959, he was ordained as a rabbi in Jerusalem. In 1963, he came to Berlin as part of the Ford Foundation's "Artists in Residence" program, and in 1965, together with Renate Heuer, he founded the Bibliographia Judaica, to date the largest encyclopedia on German-Jewish writers. He has lived in Israel again since 1969. He is married to Renée Koppel, an Algerian-Israeli calligrapher and miniaturist who specialised in Judaica.

Elazar Benyoëtz received the Adelbert von Chamisso Prize in 1988 and has been awarded the Federal Order of Merit for his services to the German language.

In 2021, Benyoëtz curated a small but essential extract of ca. 600 books from his 10,000-volume collection comprising libraries in Jerusalem and Tel Aviv, which is one of the last and largest private book collections in Israel to contain the German-Jewish literary canon. He presented the selection as a gift to the Franz Rosenzweig Minerva Research Center at the Hebrew University of Jerusalem.
