= Zafer Şenocak =

German writer (born 1961)

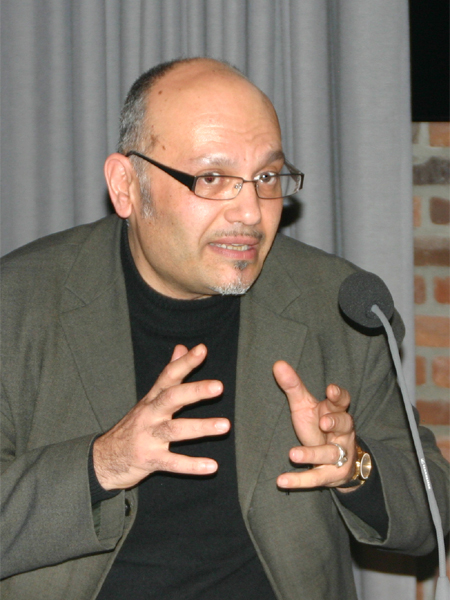
- 2008
- Born: May 25, 1961 (age 65); Ankara, Turkey
- Occupation: Writer

Zafer Şenocak (/zæˈfɑɹ ˈʃɛnoʊʤək/ born May 25, 1961) is a German writer well known for his poems, essays, and books. Born in Ankara, he has lived in Germany since 1970 and in Berlin since 1989.

== Life ==
Şenocak was born on May 25, 1961, in Ankara, Turkey. He and his family lived in Istanbul until 1970, when they moved to Munich, Germany. At LMU Munich, Şenocak studied German literature, political science, and philosophy. During this time, he began publishing his German poems. He has lived in Berlin since 1989 while occasionally working abroad in France, Canada, and the United States.

== Work ==
Since his 1983 debut with Elektrisches Blau (English Electrical Blue), Şenocak has written numerous poems, essays, and novels, primarily in German but also in Turkish, and he has also translated his works from one language to the other. Many of his works have been published in other languages as well, including English, French, Italian, Spanish, and Czech, among others. When asked about his decision to write in one language over another, Şenocak responded that, when writing fiction, one needs first and foremost the "inner voice," which will then determine the language.

One of Şenocak's earliest and most well-known poems, Doppelmann published in his 1985 collection of poems Flammentropfen, is a reflection on cultural identity and his own experience with biculturalism, topics that are prevalent in almost all of his works. Şenocak's texts about multiculturalism, transculturalism, and identity, are often based on his own experiences as a person with two different cultures, though his works are not strictly autobiographical.

In 1998 Şenocak published his novel Gefährliche Verwandtschaft, translated into English as Perilous Kinship by Tom Cheesman, in which the protagonist Sascha, a German writer, attempts to connect to his Turkish heritage by exploring the history of his deceased Turkish grandfather through his old diaries but is confronted with a language barrier that prevents him from fully understanding and connecting to his family history. Like many of his other texts, this story deals with transculturalism and cultural identity, and it also explores the links between language and one's personal sense of identity, as well as the role language plays in our social interactions.

In his works, Şenocak also features ethnic minorities in Germany, particularly German Turks, so much so that he is often regarded as a leading voice in Turkish-German relations and as a speaker for Turks in Germany, although Şenocak has said that he himself does not claim to speak for any groups. His book, Atlas des Tropischen Deutschland (1992) (Atlas of a Tropical Germany, translated by Leslie Adelson) is a series of essays which criticize the view of guest workers in Germany as foreigners, despite their contributions to German society. Şenocak has often voiced his opinions on the integration of minorities in Germany and more broadly on the relations between Turkey and Europe in various interviews and essays.

Şenocak's latest book, Das Fremde, Das in Jedem Wohnt (2018) is a more autobiographical reflection on biculturalism, foreignness (Fremde), and how differences and diversity hold society together.

== Works ==
- Elektrisches Blau. Gedichte. Munich 1983, ISBN 3-923746-11-3.
- Verkauf der Morgenstimmungen am Markt. Gedichte. Munich 1983, ISBN 3-9800423-3-2.
- Flammentropfen. Dağyeli-Verlag, Frankfurt (Main) 1985, ISBN 3-924320-25-X.
- Ritual der Jugend. Dağyeli-Verlag, Frankfurt (Main) 1987, ISBN 3-924320-60-8.
- Das senkrechte Meer: Gedichte. Babel-Verlag, Berlin 1991, ISBN 3-928551-03-5.
- Atlas of a Tropical Germany: Essays on Politics and Culture. University of Nebraska Press (November 1, 2000), ISBN 978-0803292758.
- Fernwehanstalten: Gedichte. Berlin 1994, ISBN 3-928551-13-2.
- War Hitler Araber?. Berlin 1994, ISBN 3-928551-14-0.
- Der Mann im Unterhemd. Babel-Verlag, Munich 1995, ISBN 3-928551-10-8.
- Die Prärie. Rotbuch-Verlag, Hamburg 1997, ISBN 3-88022-641-5.
- Gefährliche Verwandtschaft. Babel-Verlag, Munich 1998, ISBN 3-928551-28-0.
- Nâzim Hikmet auf dem Schiff zum Mars. Babel-Verlag, Munich 1998, ISBN 3-928551-90-6. (zusammen mit Berkan Karpat)
- Der Erottomane. Babel-Verlag, Munich 1999, ISBN 3-928551-93-0.
- Zungenentfernung. Babel-Verlag, Munich 2001, ISBN 3-928551-97-3.
- Übergang: Ausgewählte Gedichte 1980-2005. Babel-Verlag, Munich 2005, ISBN 3-928551-31-0.
- Das Land hinter den Buchstaben. Deutschland und der Islam im Umbruch. Babel-Verlag, Munich 2006, ISBN 3-928551-33-7.
- Alman Terbiyesi. Alef Yayınevi, Istanbul 2007, ISBN 978-9944-494-05-2.
- Yolculuk Nereye. Alef Yayınevi, Istanbul 2007, ISBN 978-9944-494-13-7.
- Köşk. Alef Yayınevi, Istanbul 2008, ISBN 978-9944-494-21-2.
- Door Languages, Zephyr Press; Bilingual edition, translated by Elizabeth Oehlkers Wright, October 1, 2008, ISBN 093901078X.
- Una herencia peligrosa, Editorial Pre-Textos May 1, 2009, ISBN 8481919624.
- Der Pavillon, Dagyeli Verlag, July 7, 2009, ISBN 3935597754.
- Dünyanın İki Ucu. Alef Yayınevi, Istanbul 2011.
- Deutschsein. Eine Aufklärungsschrift. Edition Körber-Stiftung, Hamburg 2011, ISBN 978-3-89684-083-7.
- "Geteilte Mündung:Gedichte", Babel Verlag, Munich 2011, ISBN 978-3-928551-40-3.
- "İlk Işık", Alef Yayınevi, Istanbul 2016, ISBN 978-9944-494-84-7.
- "In deinen Worten: Mutmaßungen über den Glauben meines Vaters", Babel Verlag, Munich 2016, ISBN 978-3-928551-41-0.
- "Das Fremde, das in jedem wohnt: Wie Unterschiede unsere Gesellschaft zusammenhalten", Körber (September 24, 2018), ISBN 978-3896842671.
- "First Light," Zephyr Press; Bilingual edition, translated by Kristin Dickinson, July 2024 ISBN 978-1-938890-30-7.

== Awards ==
He won the Adelbert von Chamisso Prize where it recognizes authors whose mother tongue is not German. (1988)
