= Ota Filip =

Czech novelist and journalist (1930–2018)

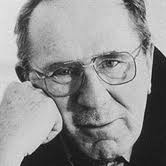
- Ota Filip, photo by Ota Filip, 1997
- Born: 9 March 1930; Ostrava, Czechoslovakia (present-day Czech Republic)
- Died: 2 March 2018 (aged 87); Garmisch-Partenkirchen, Germany
- Occupations: Novelist, Journalist, Essayist, Translator
- Spouse: Marie Ledvinová (m. 1953)
- Children: Pavel, Hana
- Writing career
- Genres: Fiction, non-fiction, satire, essay, literature, political commentary, social commentary, literary criticism

Ota Filip (9 March 1930 – 2 March 2018) was a Czech and German novelist and journalist.

== Life ==
Ota Filip was born in Slezská Ostrava, in Czechoslovakia, the present-day Czech Republic. His father, Bohumil Filip (born on 13 July 1905 in Hošt'álková, Vsetín district, Czechoslovakia), was Czech, and his mother, Marie Filipová, née Mikolajczik (born on 22 July 1908 in Slezská Ostrava), was Polish. His works have been translated into French, Italian, Japanese, Polish, Spanish, Slovenian and English, among others. During the communist era government of Czechoslovakia his works were banned or censored by the authorities. After the occupation of Czechoslovakia by Warsaw Pact Armed Forces in 1968, he was sentenced for his dissident activities, and incarcerated from 1969–70. In 1974, Ota Filip along with his wife Marie Filip (née Ledvinová) and their two children, Pavel and Hana, were forced to emigrate to West Germany. They arrived in Munich, West Germany, on 10 July 1974, where Ota Filip and his wife lived until 1994, when they moved to Grafenaschau (in the Bavarian Alps). In 1998 they settled in Murnau am Staffelsee. His son, Pavel Filip, was a professor of mathematics at Bochum University (Germany), while his daughter, Hana Filip, moved to the United States, where she received her PhD in Linguistics (University of California at Berkeley) and worked as a university professor of linguistics/semantics. Currently, she is a senior full professor of semantics at the Heinrich Heine University, Düsseldorf (Germany).

From 1975 Ota Filip was a member of the Bavarian Academy of Arts and Sciences, Munich, Germany. He was awarded a number of literary awards in Germany and the Czech Republic, including the Adelbert von Chamisso Prize for German writing by a non-native German speaker.

On 28 October 2012 Ota Filip was awarded the National Medal of Merit in Fine Arts, a merit awarded to distinguished Czech artists by the Czech government on the occasion of the anniversary of the founding of the First Czechoslovak Republic in 1918.

On 27 March 2024 Ota Filip was awarded the Prize of the City of Ostrava (in memoriam) for his contribution to the cultural development of Ostrava.

Ota Filip died on 2 March 2018 in the hospital of Garmisch-Partenkirchen of complications of pneumonia, with his daughter Hana by his side. His wife, Marie Filip, died from an aggressive form of lung cancer, on 31 December 2014, in the Klinikum Rechts der Isar, Technische Universität Munich, Comprehensive Cancer Center.

== Selected works ==
- Cesta ke hřbitovu, Profil, Ostrava, 1968
- Blázen ve městě, Konfrontace, Curych, 1975; Profil, Ostrava, 1991
- Nanebevstoupení Lojzka Lapáčka ze Slezské Ostravy, Edice Petlice, sv. č. 28, Prague, 1974; Český spisovatel, Prague, 1994
- Poskvrněné početí, 68 Publishers, Toronto, 1976; Západočeské nakladatelství, 1990
- Valdštýn a Lukrecie, 68 Publishers, Toronto, 1979
- Děda a dělo, Host, Brno, 1989
- Die Sehnsucht nach Procida, Fischer Verlag, Frankfurt am Main, 1988
- Kavárna Slavia, Český spisovatel, Prague, 1993
- Sedmý životopis, Host, Brno, 2000
- Sousedé a ti ostatní, Host, Brno, 2003
- 77 obrazů z ruského domu - Román o velké, ztroskotané lásce a vzniku abstraktního umění, Barrister & Principal, Brno, 2004
- Osmý čili nedokončený životopis, Host, Brno, 2007

== Bibliography ==
- Jan Kubica, Spisovatel Ota Filip, Větrné mlýny (Prague) 2012, ISBN 9788074430466
- Verspätete Abrechnungen von Ota Filip, mit einem Beitrag von Walter Schmitz sowie einer Bibliografie. Dresden: Thelem, 2012. (veröffentlichte 9. Dresdner Chamisso-Poetikvorlesungen)
- Verspätete Abrechnungen / Ota Filip; mit einem Beitrag von Walter Schmitz sowie einer Bibliografie. - SearchWorks (SULAIR). Searchworks.stanford.edu. 2012. ISBN 9783942411431.
- Kliems, Alfrun: Im Stummland: Zum Exilwerk von Libuse Moníková, Jirí Grusa und Ota Filip, Frankfurt am Main: Lang, 2003
- Massum Faryar, Fenster zur Zeitgeschichte: Eine monographische Studie zu Ota Filip und seinem Werk, Berlin: Mensch-und-Buch-Verl., 2005
- Kritisches Lexikon zur deutschsprachigen Gegenwartsliteratur. Hrsg. v. Heinz Ludwig Arnold. München: edition text + kritik
- Jiří Hanuš, Malý slovník osobností českého katolicismu 20. století s antologií textů, Centrum pro studium demokracie a kultury, Brno 2005. ISBN 80-7325-029-2.
- Josef Tomeš a kol., Český biografický slovník XX. století I. A-J. Paseka, Prague; Litomyšl 1999. ISBN 80-7185-245-7
