= İsmet Elçi =

German author

İsmet Elçi is a German writer of Turkish origin. He was born in East Anatolia in 1964 and came to Berlin at the age of 16, accompanying his father who had lost his livelihood as a result of the violent political situation in Eastern Turkey in the late 1970s. Elçi worked in a factory, learned German at night school, and started writing.

The films of the Kurdish director Yilmaz Güney, notably Sürü / The Herd (1978) made a strong impression on Elçi. He wrote the novel Sinan ohne Land (Sinan without a Land) which was made into a TV mini-series (ZDF, 1989). Elçi also worked as an actor on stage and screen, but kept on writing throughout. He has published several books, and written scripts for and directed several films.

Elçi's work deals with migration and exile from Turkey, and the difficult political conflicts within Turkish borders. He won the Adelbert von Chamisso Award in 1993.
