= Adelbert von Chamisso Prize =

Former German literary award

The Adelbert von Chamisso Prize (German: Adelbert-von-Chamisso-Preis) was a German literary award established in 1985, given to a work whose author's mother tongue is not German, as was the case for Adelbert von Chamisso. It was offered by the Robert Bosch Stiftung.

In addition to the main prize with a prize money of €15,000, one or more promotional prizes ("Förderpreise") with a prize money of €7,000 and sometimes an honorary award ("Ehrengabe") were given.

The prize was created by Harald Weinrich.

In 2016, the Robert Bosch Stiftung announced that the prize would be discontinued after the final 2017 award, saying that it had now fulfilled its original objective.

== Winners ==
The list shows the main prize, the promotional prizes ("PP"), and the honorary awards.

- 1985 – Aras Ören; PP: Rafik Schami
- 1986 – Ota Filip
- 1987 – Franco Biondi and Gino Chiellino
- 1988 – Elazar Benyoëtz; PP: Zafer Şenocak
- 1989 – Yüksel Pazarkaya; PP: Zehra Çırak
- 1990 – Cyrus Atabay; PP: Alev Tekinay
- 1991 – Libuše Moníková; PP: SAID
- 1992 – Adel Karasholi and Galsan Tschinag
- 1993 – Rafik Schami; PP: Ismet Elci
- 1994 – Dante Andrea Franzetti; PP: Dragica Rajcić
- 1995 – György Dalos; PP: László Csiba
- 1996 – Yoko Tawada; PP: Marijan Nakić
- 1997 – Güney Dal and José F. A. Oliver; honorary award: Jiří Gruša
- 1998 – Natascha Wodin; PP: Abdellatif Belfellah
- 1999 – Emine Sevgi Özdamar; PP: Selim Özdogan
- 2000 – Ilija Marinow Trojanow; PP: Terézia Mora and Aglaja Veteranyi
- 2001 – Zehra Çırak; PP: Radek Knapp and Vladimir Vertlib; honorary award: Imre Kertész
- 2002 – SAID; PP: Francesco Micieli and Catalin Dorian Florescu; honorary award: Harald Weinrich
- 2003 – Ilma Rakusa; PP: Hussain al-Mozany and Marica Bodrozic
- 2004 – Asfa-Wossen Asserate and Zsuzsa Bánk; PP: Yadé Kara
- 2005 – Feridun Zaimoğlu; PP: Dimitré Dinev
- 2006 – Zsuzsanna Gahse; PP: Sudabeh Mohafez and Eleonora Hummel
- 2007 – Magdalena Sadlon; PP: Que Du Luu and Luo Lingyuan
- 2008 – Saša Stanišić; PP: Michael Stavarič and Léda Forgó
- 2009 – Artur Becker; PP: María Cecilia Barbetta and Tzveta Sofronieva
- 2010 – Terézia Mora; PP: Abbas Khider and Nino Haratischwili
- 2011 – Jean Krier; PP: Olga Martynova and Nicol Ljubić
- 2012 – Michael Stavarič; PP: Akos Doma and Ilir Ferra
- 2013 – Marjana Gaponenko; PP: Matthias Nawrat and Anila Wilms
- 2014 – Ann Cotten; PP: Dana Ranga and Nellja Veramoj
- 2015 – Sherko Fatah, PP: Olga Grjasnowa and Martin Kordic
- 2016 – Esther Kinsky and Uljana Wolf
- 2017 – Abbas Khider; PP: Barbi Marković and Senthuran Varatharajah
