= Alev Tekinay =

Turkish writer (born 1951)

Alev Tekinay (born 1951) is a Turkish writer. She was born in Izmir and attended the German High School in Istanbul. She studied German at university in Munich, getting her PhD in 1979. She then taught German as a foreign language and Turkish in various Bavarian universities. From 1983, she was attached to Augsburg University. She has written novels and short stories, and was awarded the Chamisso Prize by the Bavarian Academy of Fine Arts.
