= Nils Mohl =

German writer (born 1971)

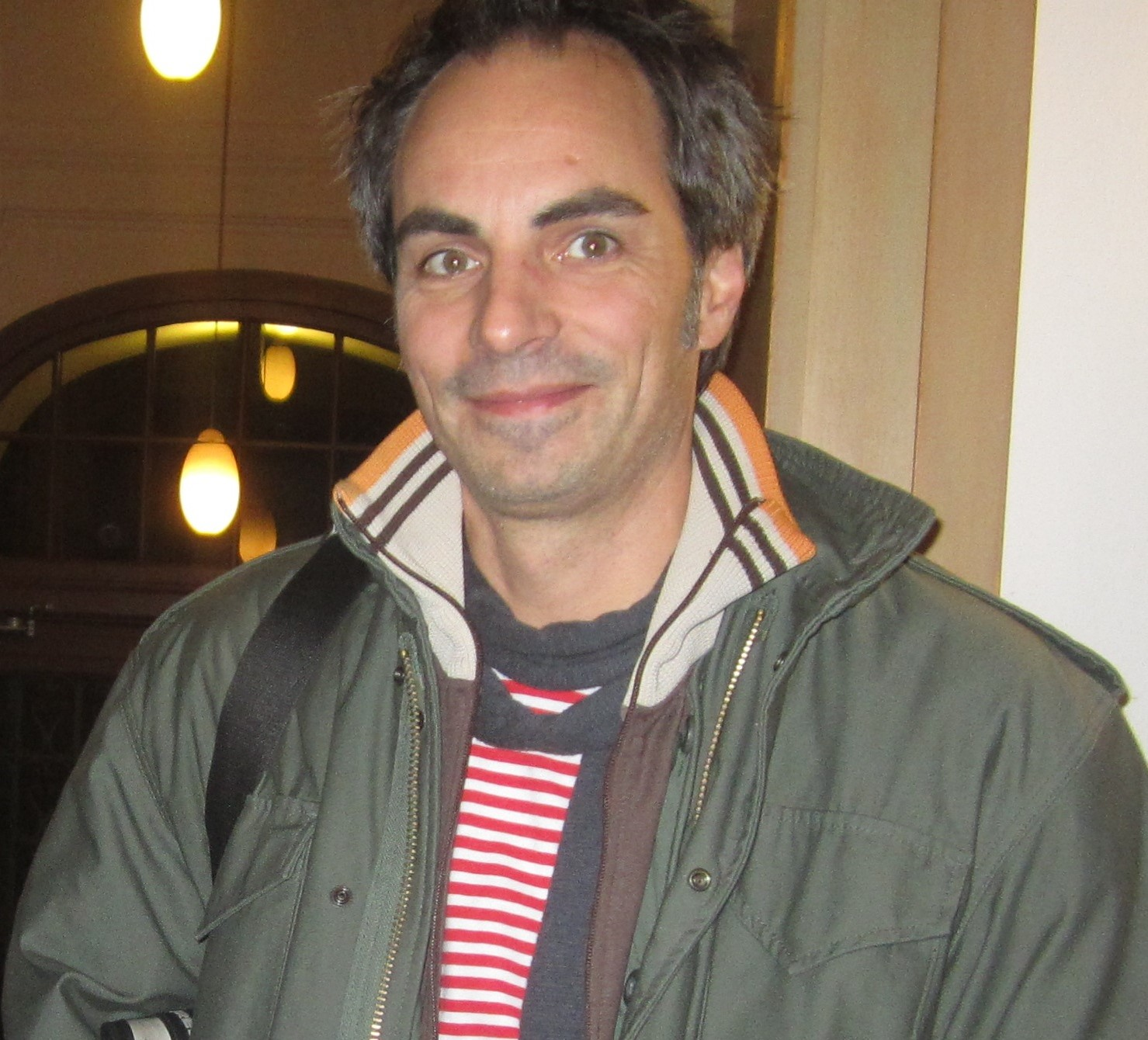
Nils Mohl 2012 at the 10th Steglitz literary festival in the Schwartzsche Villa in Berlin

Nils Mohl (born July 31, 1971, in Hamburg) is a German writer.

== Life and work ==
Mohl grew up the oldest of two siblings on the outskirts of Hamburg. He studied New German Literary Studies, Linguistics, Ethnology and Cultural Management in Kiel, Tübingen, Berlin and Weimar. He published several books, including short stories, which were particularly successful; his story Tanzen gehen, which won a prize in the MDR Literature Contest in 2016, is now read in schools. In 2012, Mohl conducted the first Berlin Masterclass, a cooperation between the International Literature Festival Berlin and the Treffen Junger Autoren (Meeting of Young Authors). Within this context he was juror for the Das außergewöhnliche Buch (The Extraordinary Book) award.

His novel Es war einmal Indianerland (Once upon a time: Indigenous Country), which was staged by the Young German Theater in Berlin 2013, furthered his reputation. In 2011 he was awarded the Oldenburger Kinder- und Jugendbuchpreis (Oldenburg Children's and Youth Literature Prize), the Kranichsteiner Literaturpreis (German Literature Fund Grand Prize), along with the Deutscher Jugendliteraturpreis (German Youth Literature Prize) in the category Jugendbuch (youth literature) for this novel. His novel Henny & Ponger, which was published in 2022, was nominated for the German Youth Literature Prize 2023 in the category youth literature. Mohl himself says of this book that he wanted to write a young adult novel that trusted the target audience with a complexity that was often lacking in this field, both in terms of structure and language. He developed many facets of the story during the writing process without much preliminary planning.

The film adaptation of Es war einmal Indianerland was released in 2017.

Mohl took part in many festivals, such as the 2nd White Ravens Festival in Munich 2012, the children and young adults programme at the 12th International Literature Festival in Berlin, as well as the 10th Steglitzer literature festival. The German school in New York invited him for the book week in 2013.

Mohl is member of the Forum of Hamburger Authors and lives with his family in Hamburg.

== Reviews ==
- Ich wäre tendenziell für ein Happy End (I tend to prefer a happy ending) (2009)

"Time and again, Mohl’s heroes struggle for orientation; they don’t know what has happened to them, and don’t know what will happen to them. The book is written in a concise, unpretentious and at times pleasantly laconic way. Nils Mohl deserves to not only be honoured, but even more importantly, to be read."

— FK, Die Welt, 29.06.2009

- Es war einmal Indianerland (Once upon a time: Indigenous Country) (2011)

"He breaks down the story of Mauser and his grueling journey to the coast, which unfolds over a few days of vacation, into the tiniest particles. He doesn adhere to any chronological narrative style, or the traditional pattern of a problem novel; instead he creates a mosaic of flashbacks and previews which reads like a mirror of what is going in Mauser’s head as he gets entangled with the two women and his own family’s problems. The novel moves back and forth just as erraticly and fast as the hero’s mood swings. The sentences are trenchant, often deeply ironic, and create a distinct echo. The hero is rarely aware of himself: “A hand reaches into my hair. I realise it’s my own.”, Mauser explains – and the reader knows: Truly living feels different. How you can get there needs explaining. In another interview Nils Mohl declares his love for using hypotetical sentences, telling stories that only happen in your own head and that answer the question “What if?”, completely blocking out the here and now. With Es war einmal Indianerland he has given an impressive shape to this confusion."

— Michael Schmitt, Eine Hand im Haar - Ein Junge aus der Vorstadt probt Leben, in: Süddeutsche Zeitung, 05.04.2012

Lightning. Thunder. Silence. […] Nils Mohl has written a novel like a thunderstorm about the coming of age in the suburbs. […] Everything about this book is short; the sentences come crashing down, sometimes only consisting of lists or flashes of thoughts. The book races, time races. Twelve days of holiday to process everything, to solve all problems, and to sort out all relationships and, oh yeah, to grow up. Bang.

— Sebastian Stier, Jugendroman "Es war einmal Indianerland": Blitz. Donner. Ruhe., auf: Spiegel Online vom 27. Juni 2011

- Henny & Ponger (2022)

The emotional turmoil of standing on the threshold of adulthood, not of this world, is the centre of the fast-paced story about Henny and Ponger, whose identity doesn't remain a mystery but still sounds completely crazy. With a wink, 51-year-old Nils Mohl from Hamburg hides fragments from well-known science fiction movies, as well as song titles by Elvis, Rihanna and [Swiss singer-songwriter] Sophie Hunger, in his plot full of cheeky dialogues. Nils Mohl’s poetic writing may be influenced by nostalgic memories of his own youth, but the tragicomical encounter of his … duo with their first great love is both current and timeless for readers from the age of thirteen.

— Britta Selle, Unter Büchern. Kinder- und Jugendbuch, auf: MDR Kultur vom 3. August 2022

== Publications (selection) ==
- Kasse 53. (Checkout counter 53) Achilla Presse, Butjadingen 2008, ISBN 978-3-940350-03-9.
- Ich wäre tendenziell für ein Happy End. (I tend to prefer a happy ending.) 12 short stories Plöttner Verlag, Leipzig 2009, ISBN 978-3-938442-65-4.
- Ballade von dünnen Männern. (Ballad of thin men.) Hosentaschenverlag, Hannover 2010, ISBN 978-3-941938-12-0.
- "Suburbs Trilogy":
  - Es war einmal Indianerland. (Once upon a time: Indigenous Country.) Rowohlt Verlag, Hamburg 2011, ISBN 978-3-499215-52-0.
  - Stadtrandritter. (Suburban knights.) Rowohlt, Hamburg 2013, ISBN 978-3-499216-14-5.
  - Zeit für Astronauten. (Time for astronauts.) Rowohlt, Hamburg 2016, ISBN 978-3-499216-78-7.
- Mogel. (Cheat.) Rowohlt, Hamburg 2014, ISBN 978-3-499215-37-7.
- König der Kinder (King of the children). Illustration von Katharina Greve. Mixtvision, München 2020, ISBN 978-3-95854-155-9.
- Tänze der Untertanen (Dances of the subjects). Mixtvision, München 2020, ISBN 978-3-95854-156-6.
- Henny & Ponger. Mixtvision, München 2022, ISBN 978-3-95854-182-5.
- Wilde Radtour mit Velociraptorin (Wild bike ride with velociraptor). Illustrated by Halina Kirschner mairisch Verlag, Hamburg 2023, ISBN 978-3-948722-27-2.
- Tierische Außenseiter. Reime über unknuddelige Große wie Kleine mit und ohne Beine. (Animal outsiders. Rimes about uncuddly big and small ones with and without legs.) Illustrated by Katharina Greve. Tryolia, Innsbruck/Wien ISBN 978-3-7022-4149-0.

== Stage plays ==
- 2003: Revolution. Text: Nils Mohl and Max Reinhold. Premiere 2003 Raum 33 in Basel
- 2013: Es war einmal Indianerland. (Once upon a time: Indigenous Country.) Stage play adapted from the novel by Nils Mohl, production and edition: Kristina Stang. Luisa Wolf. Premiere 2013 at the Deutschen Theater Berlin

== Awards ==
- 2000: Limburg-Preis
- 2001: Scholarship of the Literary Colloquium Berlin
- 2001: Participation in the 9th open mike of the Literaturwerkstatt Berlin
- 2002: Hamburger Literaturförderpreis
- 2003: Participation in the 11th open mike of the Literaturwerkstatt Berlin as Enno Zweyner (together with Oliver Kemmann)
- 2003: 3rd place at the MDR Literature Contest
- 2004: Scholarship for the 8th Klagenfurter Literaturkurs
- 2006: 3rd place at the MDR Literature Contest
- 2008: Hamburg Literaturförderpreis
- 2011: Oldenburg Children's and Youth Literature Prize for Es war einmal Indianerland
- 2012: German Literature Fund Grand Prize for Es war einmal Indianerland
- 2012: Award as one of the most beautiful German books by Stiftung Buchkunst for Es war einmal Indianerland
- 2012: German Youth Literature Prize in the category Jugendbuch (youth literature) for Es war einmal Indianerland
- 2016: Luchs des Monats August for Zeit für Astronauten
- 2022: Austrian Children's and Youth Literature Prize for An die, die wir nicht werden wollen (To those we don't want to become) (together with Regina Kehn)
- 2024: James Krüss Preis for international children's and youth literature
