= Yüksel Pazarkaya =

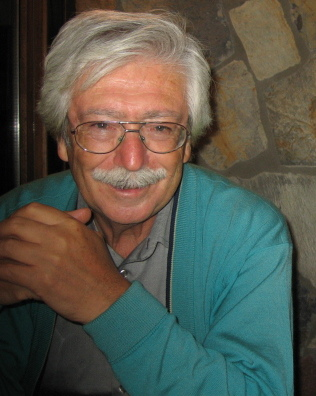
Yüksel Pazarkaya

Yüksel Pazarkaya (born 1940) is a Turkish writer.

He was born in 1940 in İzmir and studied engineering at the University of Stuttgart, before turning to study literature and philosophy. He has taught at universities in Germany (Stuttgart, Dresden), America (Princeton, Bryn Mawr, St. Louis Washington and Ohio State) and Turkey. He was the head of the daily Turkish broadcasts department of German Public Radio Association (ARD). His translations from German to Turkish and from Turkish to German have been published along with poetry, short stories, novels, theater and study books. He is the winner of the Chamisso Prize.
