= Anila Wilms =

Albanian writer living in Germany

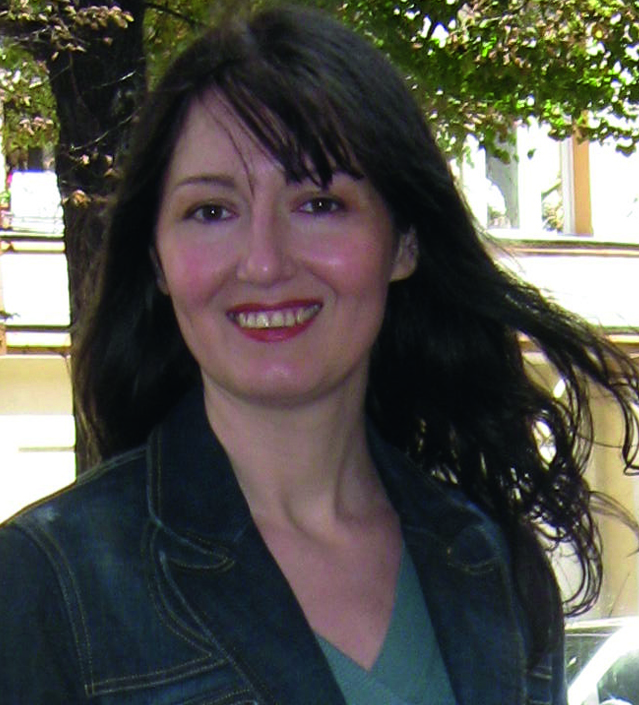
- Born: 1971 (age 54–55)
- Occupation: Novelist

Anila Wilms is an Albanian writer living in Germany.

Wilms was born in Tirana and grew up in the Albanian port of Durrës. On her maternal side, she comes from a family of wealthy and politically influential beys who were expropriated and disempowered after 1945 as enemies of the communist regime. From 1989 to 1993, she studied history and philology at the University of Tirana.

As a DAAD scholarship holder, she came to Berlin in 1994 and has lived there ever since as a writer and publicist. In August 2012, she published her first novel in German Das albanische Öl oder Mord auf der Straße des Nordens (The Albanian Oil or Murder on the Road of the North) in Berlin, based on historical research. The novel is set in the 1920s and is described as "an exotic, burlesque episode from the history of the young Albanian nation in the form of a political thriller". She first wrote the book in Albanian and published it in Tirana in 2007. In 2013, she was awarded the Adelbert von Chamisso Prize for her writing.
