= Barbi Marković =

Serbian writer

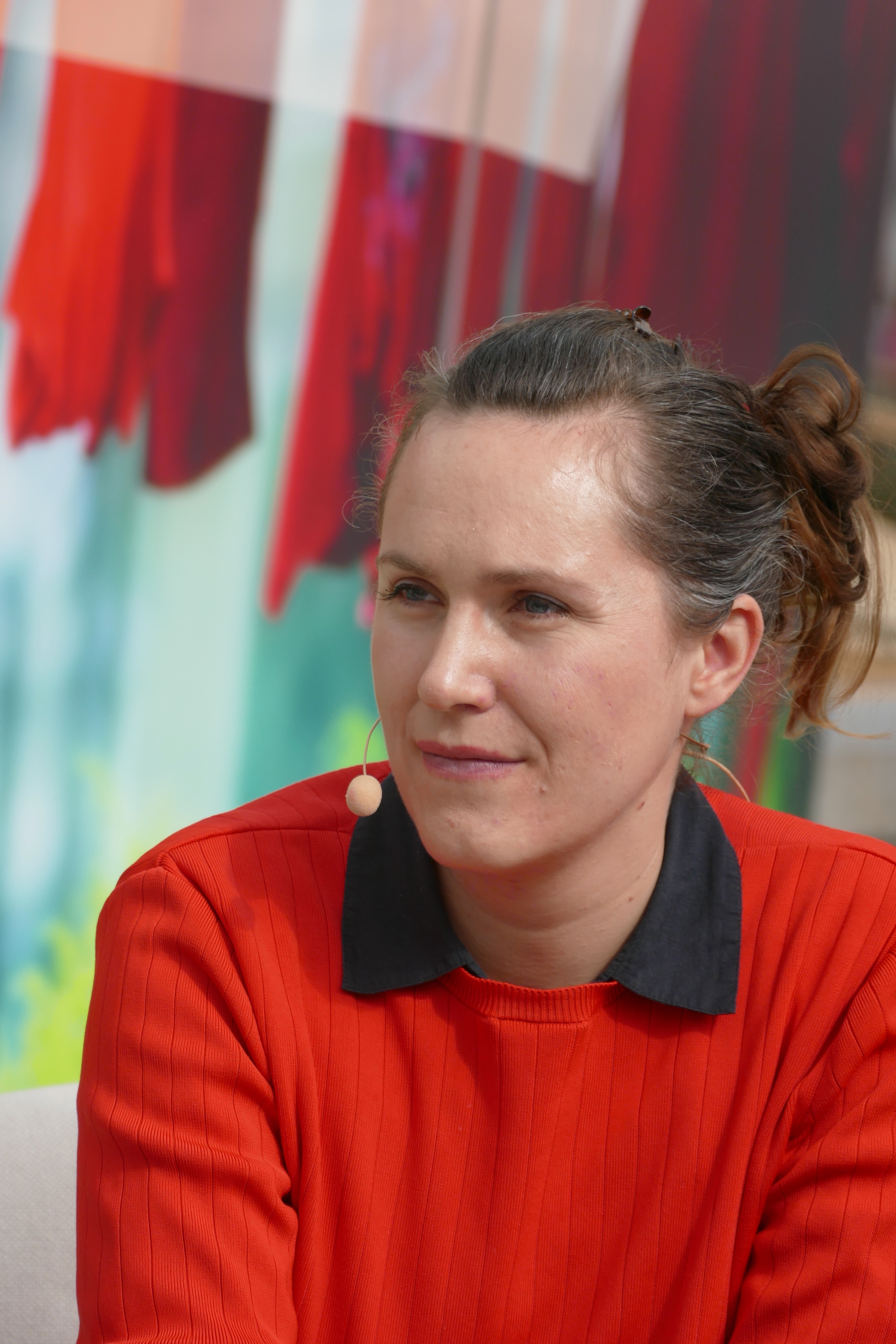
Marković in 2017

Barbi Marković is a Serbian writer. She was born in 1980 in Belgrade. She studied German literature at university in Vienna and Belgrade. She worked as an editor for the publisher Rende Verlag in Belgrade. She has been a resident of Austria since 2009; the same year she launched her literary career in German with "Ausgehen" ("Going Out", originally published in 2006 as "Izlaženje"), based on a story by Thomas Bernhard. Her novel Superheroines was written partly in German and partly in Serbian.

She won the Chamisso Prize in 2017, and for Minihorror she was awarded the Leipzig Book Fair Prize for fiction in 2024.
