= Jean Krier =

Luxembourgish poet

- Born: January 2, 1949
- Died: January 12, 2013 (aged 64)
- Resting place: Luxembourg
- Writing career
- Notable awards: Adelbert von Chamisso Prize

Jean Krier (2 January 1949 – 12 January 2013) was a Luxembourgish poet who in 2011 was awarded both the Adelbert von Chamisso Prize for the best work by a non-German author and the Servais Prize for the best literary work written by a Luxembourger. In both cases, the work in question was Herzens Lust Spiele (2010). In connection with the Chamisso prize, the jury commented on how the work provided an original and impressive enrichment of German-language poetry. "His carpets of German, subtly interspersed with sprinkles of French, are fed by experiential elements and reading experiences".

Krier was born in Luxembourg City, studied German and English literature in Freiburg, and lived and worked in Luxembourg. He contributed poems to German-language publications such as NDL (NeueDeutscheLyriker), Manuskripte: Zeitschrift für Literatur, Akzente: Zeitschrift für Dichtung, Das Gedicht: Zeitschrift für Lyrik, Essay und Kritik and Poet-magazin.

== Works ==
- "Herzens Lust Spiele", poetenladen, Leipzig, 2010
- "Gefundenes Fressen", Rimbaud, Aachen, 2005
- "Tableaux/Sehstücke", Gollenstein, Blieskastel, 2002
- "Bretonische Inseln", Landpresse, Weilerswist, 1995
