= Aglaja Veteranyi =

Swiss actor and writer (1962–2002)

Aglaja Veteranyi (1962–2002) was a Swiss writer and actor of Romanian origin, from a family of Romanian and Hungarian descent. She was born in Bucharest but eventually settled in Switzerland with her family of touring circus performers. She is best known for her novel Why the Child Is Cooking in the Polenta. After her death in 2002, a novel and several collections of Veteranyi's prose and note were published. Veteranyi was awarded the 2000 Adelbert von Chamisso Prize.

== Life ==
Veteranyi was born in Bucharest in 1962, into a family of circus performers, and she appeared in the ring as a child. The family left Romania for Switzerland in 1967, after Nicolae Ceausescu came to power, although they travelled throughout Europe, Africa and South America afterwards. Veterany settled in back in Switzerland in 1978, where she taught herself to read and write German. From 1979 until 1982 she attended the drama school in Zurich, the Schauspiel-Gemeinschaft. Veteranyi was a writer and actor, and she founded two performance groups, one with René Oberholzer in 1993 called Die Wortpumpe and then in 1996 another with Jens Nielsen, called Die Engelmaschine.

Veteranyi published short prose in anthologies and magazines, but is best known for her novel Why the Child Is Cooking in the Polenta, which was published in 1999 and garnered international attention. Veteranyi died from suicide in Zurich in 2002, and several of her writings were published posthumously. The novel Das Regal der letzten Atemzüge was published in 2002, a collection of prose in 2004, Vom geräumten Meer, den gemieteten Socken und Frau Butter, and two volumes of previously unpublished writing and notes, Café Papa and Wörter statt Möbel, both published in 2018. Veteranyi left a large number of literary notebooks, drafts and plays, including a wedding dress covered in writing was she had used in a performance in 2001.

A film, Why the Child Boils in Polenta/ Aglaja, directed by Krisztina Deak, was the grand winner of the Monte Carlo Television Film Festival in 2013, also winning categories for the best director and best female performance.

== Awards ==
- 2000, Adelbert von Chamisso Prize
