= Aras Ören =

Turkish actor, journalist and writer (born 1939)

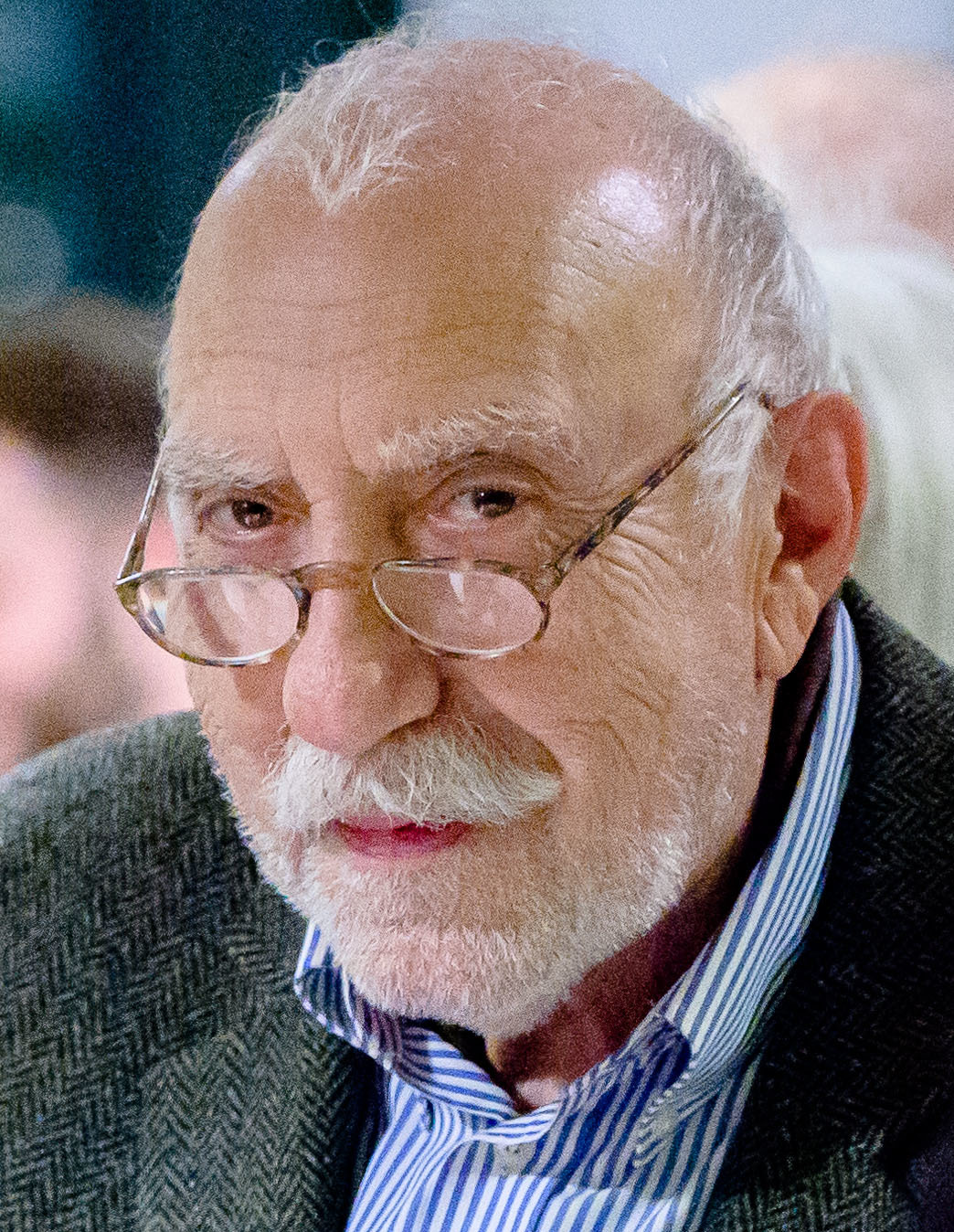
- Aras Ören in 2019 at an event in Berlin by the Heinrich Böll Foundation celebrating his work
- Born: 1939 (age 86–87); Istanbul, Turkey
- Occupations: Writer; journalist; actor; radio producer
- Writing career
- Language: Turkish, German
- Years active: 1973-present
- Period: Contemporary
- Genres: Fiction; poetry; journalism
- Notable awards: Adelbert von Chamisso Prize

Aras Ören is a writer of Turkish origin, currently living in Germany. He was born in November 1939 in Istanbul, and moved to Berlin in 1969. He was an editor at Sender Freies Berlin and head of the Turkish editorial team of Radio Multikulti at Rundfunk Berlin-Brandenburg. In 1981, he received an honorary prize from the Bavarian Academy of Fine Arts. In 1985, he was awarded the Adelbert von Chamisso Prize. In 1999, he was a lecturer at the University of Tübingen. Since 2012, he has been a member of the Academy of Arts, Berlin.

Ören writes in Turkish and helps to translate his works into German. Some of his works first appeared in German. His works include What does Niyazi want in Naunynstrasse (1973), Privatexil (1976), Germany. A Turkish fairy tale (1978), Please, No Police (1981), Berlin-Savignyplatz (1995) and Longing for Hollywood (1999). He has also published Kopfstand (2014), a collection of short stories, and Wir neuen Europäer (2016), a collection of his writings since the 1960s. Both are illustrated by the artist Wolfgang Neumann.
