= Sudabeh Mohafez =

German author (born 1963)

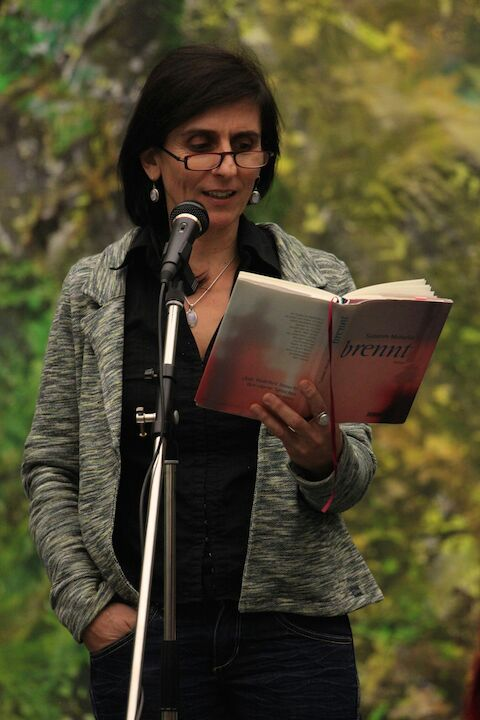
- Sudabeh Mohafez 2012 reading from her novel "brennt"
- Born: 1963 (age 62–63); Tehran, Imperial State of Iran
- Occupation: Writer

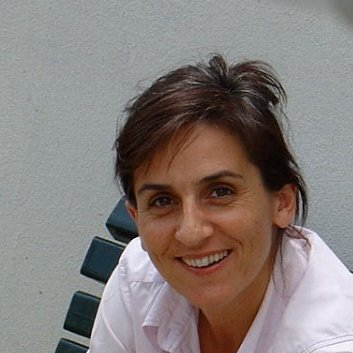
Sudabeh Mohafez

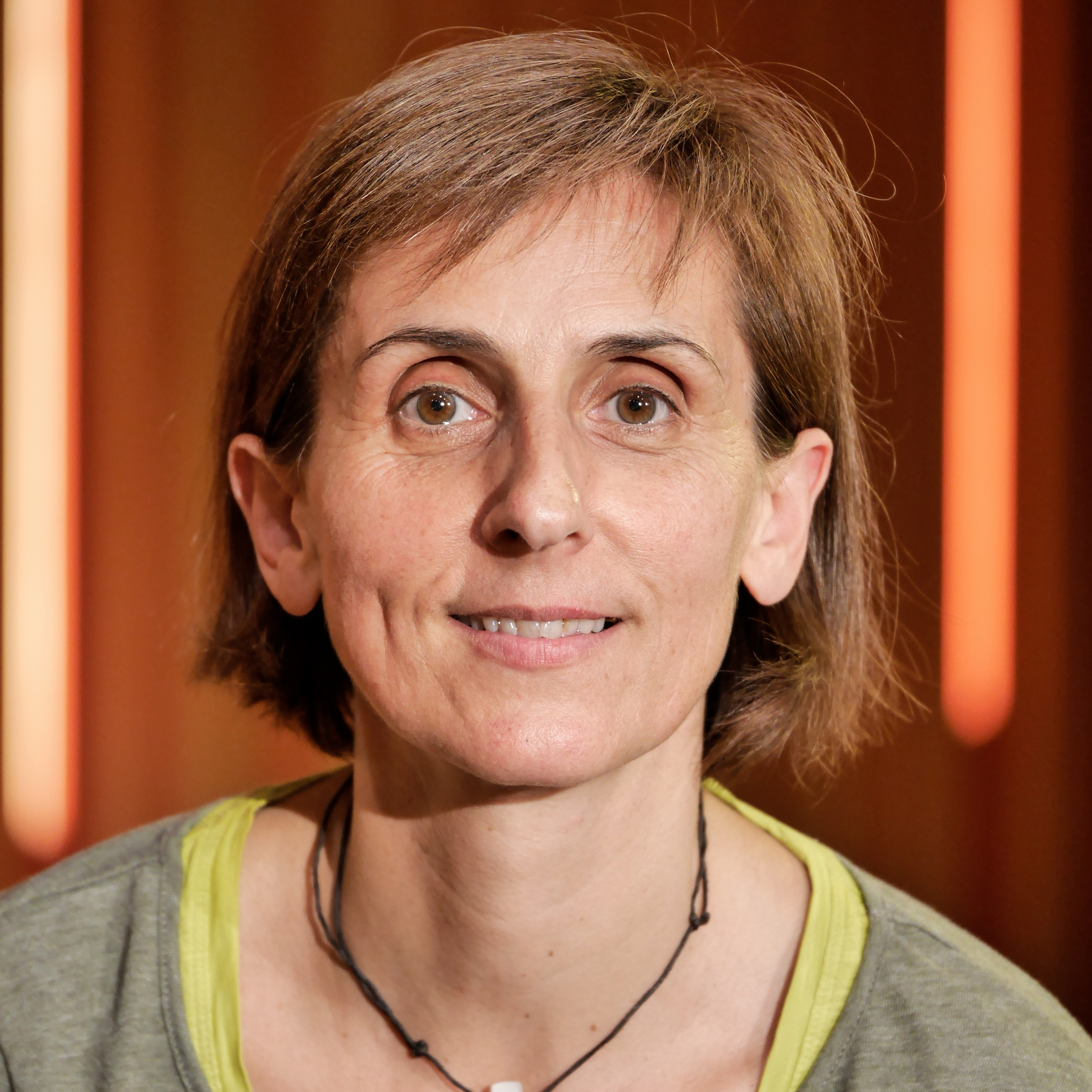
Sudabeh Mohafez at the Hausacher Leselenz 2015"

Sudabeh Mohafez (Persian: سودابه محافظ) born 1963 in Tehran, Imperial State of Iran is a German author.

== Biography ==
Sudabeh Mohafez studied music, English studies and pedagogy. She worked at various Non-governmental organizations in the field of violence prevention. After many years in Berlin and a few in Lisbon, she now lives as a freelance writer in Baden-Württemberg.

Sudabeh Mohafez is author of narratives, novels, poems, portraits and theaterplays. She received several literary scholarships and the Adelbert von Chamisso Prize. She was Poetic lecturer at the RheinMain University of Applied Sciences. In January 2008, her literary blog was awarded with the Isla-Volante Literature Prize, while in May of the same year she won the MDR-Literaturpreis.

== Works ==
- Wüstenhimmel Sternenland, Erzählungen. Arche Verlag Zürich/Hamburg 2004, ISBN 978-3-7160-2332-7
- Gespräch in Meeresnähe, Roman. Arche Verlag, Zürich/Hamburg 2005, ISBN 978-3-7160-2346-4
- brennt, Roman. DuMont Verlag, Köln 2010, ISBN 978-3-8321-9573-1
- das zehn-zeilen-buch", 52 ultra kurzgeschichten. Edition AZUR, Dresden 2010, ISBN 978-3-9812804-6-3
- Vorlesungen der Wiesbadener Poetikdozentur. In: nehmen sie mich beim wort im kreuzverhör. Fischer Verlag, 2010. ISBN 978-3-596-18407-1
- Das Eigenartige Haus, (Illustr.: Rittiner und Gomez). edition taberna kritika, Bern 2012, ISBN 978-3-905846-19-5
- "Kitsune. Three micro-novels", (Illustr.: Rittiner und Gomez). edition AZUR, Dresden 2016, ISBN 978-3-942375-22-1

== Awards ==
- Scholarship literature of the Landes Baden-Württemberg
- Scholarship of the Deutschen Literaturfonds
- Scholarship of the Stiftung Preußische Seehandlung
- Scholarship of the Robert Bosch Stiftung
- Scholarship of the Berliner Senatsverwaltung für Kultur
- Residency at the art academy of Schloss Wiepersdorf
- Residency at the Stuttgarter Schriftstellerhaus
- Writer in Residence at the Queen Mary University of London
- Writer in Residence at the University of Nottingham
- Nominated for the Ingeborg-Bachmann-Preis 2008
- Adelbert-von-Chamisso-Förderpreis
- MDR-Literaturpreis
- Isla-Volante-Literaturprize for the literary webblog zehn zeilen
- Poetics lecturer at the RheinMain University of Applied Sciences
