= Gino Chiellino =

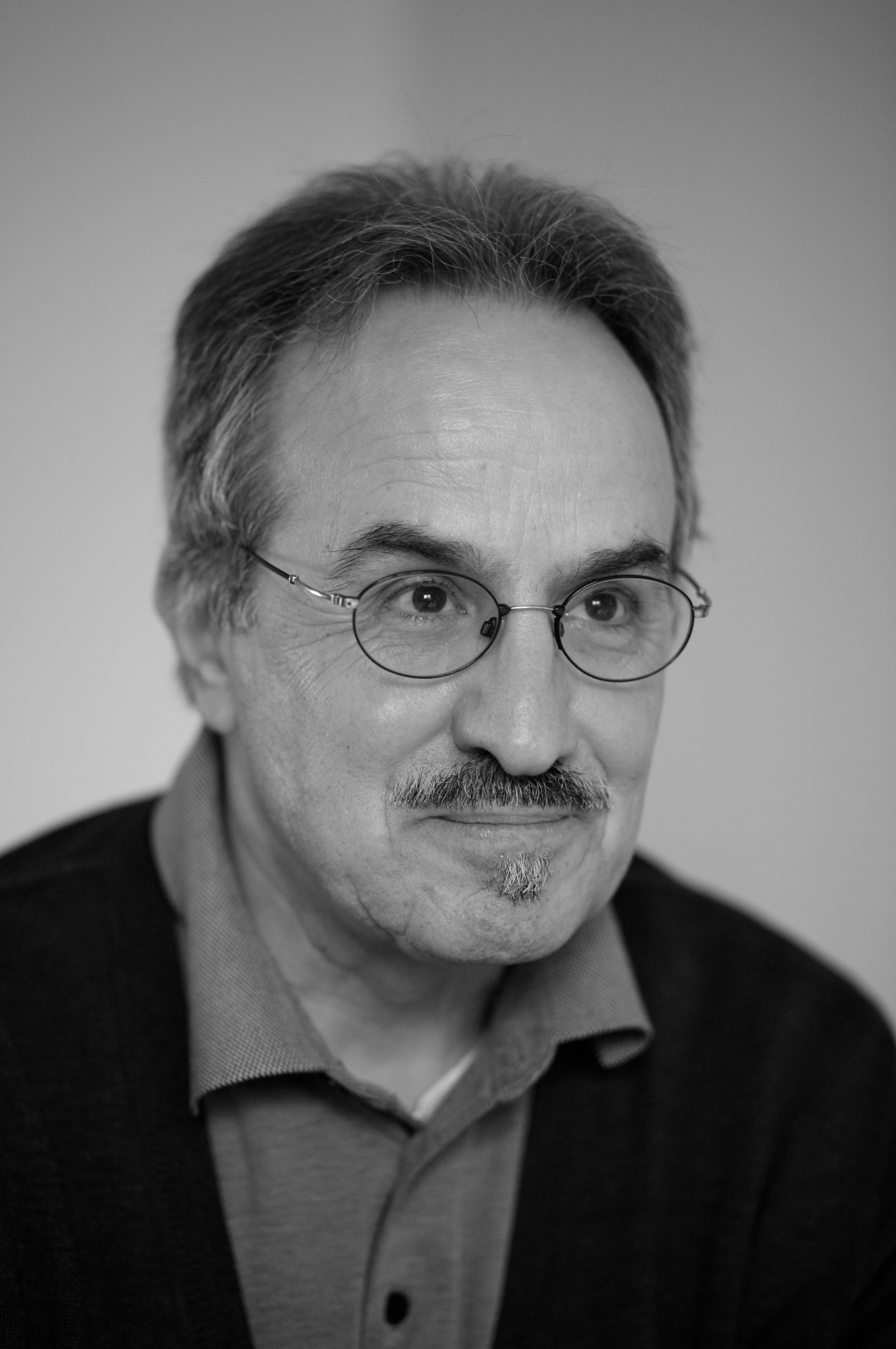
Carmine Gino Chiellino

Carmine Gino Chiellino (born in 1946 in Carlopoli, Italy) is an intercultural literary scholar, writer, editor and translator. He traveled to Germany for the first time in 1969 to conduct research for his university thesis. After studying Italian and sociology, which he completed at La Sapienza in Rome, he studied German. He did his doctorate at the University of Giessen on the "futurism debate" in Germany. In addition to his work as an Italian lecturer, Chiellino devoted himself to researching literature and migration in Germany. He completed his studies in Comparative Literature at the University of Augsburg in 1993 and was appointed Professor of Comparative Literature there in 2001. Chiellino is the editor of several standard works on questions of German-language literature and migration.

While he publishes his literary works and essays under the name Carmine Chiellino, he has published poetry in German under the name Gino Chiellino since 1976. In 1987 he received the Adelbert von Chamisso Prize for his literary work. To date he has published numerous collections of poetry, among them:

- Sehnsucht nach Sprache (1987)
- Weil Rosa die Weberin... Ausgewählte Gedichte 1977-1991 (2005)
- Landschaft aus Menschen und Tagen (2010)

The novel Der Engelfotograf: Eine Kindheit in Kalabrien was ppubished in 2016.

Chiellino was the founder and temporary chairman of PoLiKunst (Polynational Literature and Art Association) in 1980, published the series "Südwind Gastarbeiterdeutsch", and in 2008 founded the research group "Parolavissuta" to research intercultural literature in Europe. He donated his library to the European University Viadrina in 2018.
