= Please, No Police =

Please No Police is a 1981 novella by Aras Ören. Set in 1973, it follows a cast of German and Turkish characters living in the Kreuzberg district of Berlin, Germany. The story primarily concerns Ali, an illegal Turkish migrant trying to find work, and the Gramke family, who are native working-class Berliners. The book was originally written in Turkish and published in German as Bitte nix Polizei. An English translation was later published in 1992.

== Historical context ==
The beginning of the Guest Worker program in Germany started with the postwar labor recruitment treaty. The Federal Republic of Germany signed a treaty with Italy in 1955 which defined what a “guest” worker or Gastarbeiter is and the application process that allowed them to enter the country. Guest Worker programs came about due to the high labor demand from industrialized economies of Western Europe and the excess labor supply from less industrialized countries. Germany received mainly Turkish workers, which promised them more work opportunities that would lead to upward mobility. The treaty between Turkey and Germany was signed on September 1, 1961, when Turkey was struggling to sort through political conflict. At first, these workers were gladly accepted by German society, but the demand for workers wasn’t being fulfilled fast enough and Germany threatened to seek laborers from other countries. Many Turkish workers failed to pass the recruitment process, which included a medical check-up, and those who did pass could not bring their families with them. Although accepted in the beginning, in more recent years the Turkish workers are described as un-assimilated, and there is a growing animosity towards the group of people that some even describe as reminiscent of the feelings towards Jews in pre-war Germany.

Ören’s work is a part of a subgenre of literature dealing with the Turkish migrant’s experience in Germany. This genre of literature has been labeled Gastarbeiterliteratur and has had over 1,100 works written on this content in the past thirty five years. This genre focuses on the interpretation of recruitment practices, competitions, appropriations, and movements through many different media from poetic critiques, to the celebration of multicultural identities.

== Major characters ==
=== Brigitte ===
The sixteen-year-old daughter of Frau Gramke and Bruno Gramke. She doesn’t have a good relationship with her parents. She struggles with what direction to take her life.

=== Frau Gramke ===
A 52-year-old woman who cleans offices for a living and used to work as a rubble clearing woman. She is married to Bruno Gramke, who does not have a job. They have lived in their apartment for nine years.

=== Ali Itir ===
A Turkish immigrant living illegally in Germany. His passport was marked as 'Tourist' when he entered the country, so he cannot officially work and struggles with finding a job. He lives with his cousins while he tries to find work that he can be paid for under the table.

== Summary ==
The novel opens with Frau Gramke waking up from a dream about a white flower, which gave her a sort of pleasure. She wakes up to her husband Bruno Gramke still sleeping who still has the smell of beer on him. While he is sleeping he is dreaming about trying to reach West Berlin, which to him would mean that all of his problems would go away and he would find a job. When Frau Gramke gets out of bed she trips on trash that she blames her daughter, Brigitte, for leaving around. Frau Gramke wakes up her daughter, who is sleeping on the couch, in order to tell her to it pick up. Both of the characters are annoyed at one another, and Brigitte refuses to wake up. Frau Gramke goes outside in order to shovel snow when her elderly neighbor who is walking his dog greets her. In return, she reluctantly greets him back and continues to shovel snow. When she returns inside, she sees the man fall but does not do anything to help him even though he is calling for help. She instead then wishes for him to freeze where he fell.

Frau Gramke tries to wake up her daughter again and they trade some harsh words. Brigitte gets ready for the day reluctantly and decides not to have breakfast with her father since they fight often. The night before, she and her parents fought about how Brigitte came home too late and would never be able to get a job like her sister, who they think is a hairdresser making a lot of money but in reality is a prostitute. One of the main problems Brigitte has faced in this point in her life is whether or not to start a life of her own with her boyfriend Achim, which in her mind would eventually lead to turning into her parents the exact opposite of what she wants. She decides to go to a café that she frequents often and meets with her friend Frank. They share a laugh, but Achim walks into the café at this moment and is bothered by their interactions. He grabs Brigitte and takes her to a tattoo artist where he forces her to get a tattoo of a blue cross in the center of her chest. While they were waiting to enter into the building, a Turkish woman hesitates as if she were going to say something, but instead she moves on. When Brigitte gets home, she sees her tattoo in the mirror and steals 100 marks from her father.

The novel switches perspectives and presents Ali Itir. He wakes up and immediately starts worrying about finding a job since there has been no jobs in the past couple of days. He lives with his cousins he calls Ibrahim and Sultan, both of whom have jobs. When he was first coming into Germany, Ali’s passport was stamped as a tourist’s would be even though he begged the officer to stamp it differently. Since his passport was stamped in this way, he cannot get a job legally, and for seven months Ali has been struggling living in the country. Even after his moving in with his relatives he still struggles with the idea that he is a burden since he doesn’t have a job. He is hopeful at the prospect of work though since the snow would need to be shoveled.

That morning he went to an office that hired him under the table to shovel snow. When he enters the office the man asks him where his friends are, and Ali thinks that the police will be coming to arrest him. It is revealed that the man was just disappointed that there weren’t going to be more workers to shovel the time, but still Ali is anxious and has a flash back to when he was in the military. The man hiring him checks his passport and tells Ali to go back to the place he worked yesterday and that he would return to the office to retrieve his money and his passport. Ali almost calls the man Commander after the man tells him to start work at a specific time.

After Achim dropped Brigitte off at her house, he goes to the café where he had dragged Brigitte out of and drinks with his friends. When they leave, they come across the old man who had fallen earlier that morning. Recognizing him as Brigitte’s neighbor, he stops to help him up even though he and his friends think he is drunk. After a feeble attempt to pick him up, he and his friends leave thinking that the police will help him sooner or later, but the next person to encounter him is Ali. Ali was walking to work when he sees a commotion on the far side of the street. When he reaches the man who had fallen down, he stops to help, but when the man asks for the police, Ali asks the man for the police not to be involved. However, a crowd had started to gather around them and Ali starts hearing people mutter police. That is when he decides to run away from the situation.

When Frau Gramke leaves their flat for work, it is unclear as to whether or not she looks in the direction of the elderly man who now has a group of people arguing around him about what to do next. Frau Gramke works cleaning offices, which is grueling work since she often gets yelled at by the workers there for not cleaning something properly. She works with a Turkish woman named Hatçe who seems to disappear at the worst times leaving Frau Gramke to do most of the work. It isn’t until she finds Hatçe on the toilet does she realize why. This causes a flashback to when Frau Gramke worked by cleaning up the rubble after the war. She is reminded of a woman named Hilde who was pulled out of the rubble. Hatçe is seen to be bleeding due to an abortion that she had, and Frau Gramke wants to call a doctor even though Hatçe refuses. A secretary eventually calls the police for her.

While all of this is happening, Brigitte decides to skip work for the day, but consequently has to deal with her father. When she leaves, she sees that the café she usually hangs out at is closed and decides to go to a different café where she looks for jobs like her sister’s profession in the newspaper. Frau Gramke goes to the market where she gossips about her elderly neighbor. It is revealed that he was her former boss when she was a rubble woman. She thinks back to that time and remembers how all of the women bribed him with sex. His name is revealed as Ernst Kutte and Frau Gramke knew that he always liked her when they worked together. She then remembers the time when he sexually assaults her. After she is done shopping, she goes to the tavern where her husband is conversing with Her Stadtrat who is a councilman. The crowd agrees with what Bruno is saying, and Frau Gramke supports her husband in order to avoid conversing more about Kutte. The conversation then turns towards the availability of jobs and how many employers are hiring Turks instead of native Berliners. After this, there is a silence that is interrupted with news that Kutte is dead from heart failure.

Ali is at work on the toilet during his break since he didn’t get enough sleep the night before. He dozes off and remembers his job as a police officer in Istanbul, but he is interrupted by knocking on the door. When his lunch break finally arrives, he is almost refused a meal because he doesn’t have a meal ticket, but a student he encountered before gave him an extra ticket. Ali and the student eat together even though Ali wants to avoid conversation. Meanwhile, Frau Gramke goes to visit the apartment of Ernst Kutte where a tobacconist opens the door. She is uneasy, but she enters the flat anyway and sees a picture of all the rubble clearing women. Brigitte isn’t at home either and is instead goes to her usual café. It is there that her friends tell her that Ernst Kutte has died. While her friends fill her in on the details, a policeman is waiting for his curry sausage pretending not to hear anything. She then approaches two men in the doorway of a tavern and asks for a cigarette. One of the men is Ali, and they agree to go to her place. He would pay her 20 marks for their encounter. After their awkward intercourse, Brigitte leaves in a panic while Ali chases after to try and pay her. She then goes to the police to report the incident as a forced sexual encounter. Ali no longer has a place to stay with his cousins and tries to avoid the police at all costs.

The novel ends with Frau Gramke collecting money in order to buy a wreath for Ernst Kutte. Brigitte is again at the café she frequents often when a police van with a drawing of a man and a dummy wearing similar clothes to what Ali was wearing drives past. A loudspeaker announced that a body had been found dead in the Landwhr Canal, and it was unclear if it was an accident, suicide, or murder. Brigitte tells Achim that this was the man that she almost prostituted herself to, and they drive off together.
