= Matthias Nawrat =

German writer (born 1979)

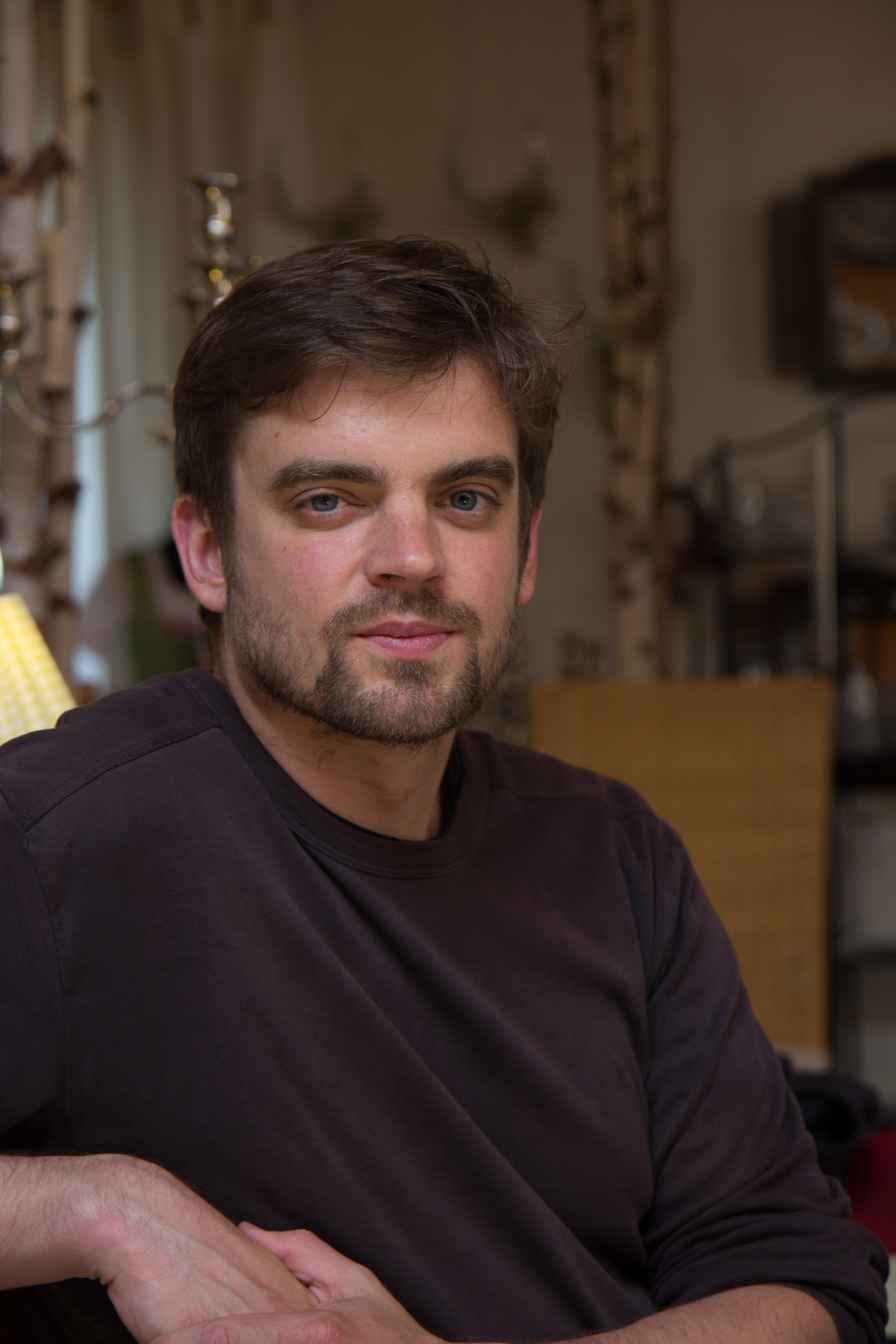
- Matthias Nawrat in 2013
- Born: 1979 (age 46–47); Opole
- Writing career
- Language: German
- Genre: Novels

Matthias Nawrat (born 1979 in Opole) is a German writer.

== Life ==
Matthias Nawrat was born in Opole in Poland. He moved with his family in 1989 to Bamberg. From 2000 to 2007, he studied Biology at Heidelberg and Freiburg im Breisgau. Beginning in 2009 he studied at the Swiss Literature Institute in Biel/Bienne. His debut novel, Wir zwei allein was published in 2012 by Nagel & Kimche. He lives in Berlin.

== Works ==
=== Novels ===
- Wir zwei allein. Nagel & Kimche, Zürich 2012. ISBN 978-3-312-00497-3.
- Unternehmer. Rowohlt Verlag, Hamburg 2014. ISBN 978-3-498-04612-5.
- Die vielen Tode unseres Opas Jurek. Rowohlt Verlag, Reinbek 2015. ISBN 978-3-498-04631-6.

== Awards ==
- MDR-Literaturpreis 2011
- Silberschweinpreis der lit.COLOGNE 2012
- Aufenthaltsstipendium am Literarischen Colloquium Berlin (LCB) 2012
- Literaturpreis des Kantons Bern 2012
- Kelag-Preis beim Ingeborg-Bachmann-Preis 2012
- Heinrich-Heine-Stipendium Lüneburg 2013
- Förderpreis des Adelbert-von-Chamisso-Preis 2013
- 2014 Longlist beim Deutschen Buchpreis mit Unternehmer
