= MDR-Literaturpreis =

MDR-Literaturpreis was a German literary prize. The prize was awarded by the Mitteldeutscher Rundfunk from 1996 to 2015. The main prize was endowed with 5,000 euros, the second with 2,500 euros and the third with 1,500 euros (donated by Druckhaus Köthen), as well an audience award was endowed with 1000 euros. The award consisted of a literary short story competition.

== Recipients ==
- 1996 1. Prize: Renate Schröder
- 1997 1. Prize: Henner Kotte
- 1998 1. Prize: Ulman Weiß
- 1999 1. Prize: Jörg Jacob
- 2000 1. Prize: Undine Materni
- 2001 1. Prize: Clemens Meyer
- 2002 1. Prize: Simone Gertz, 2. Prize: Ralf Eggers, 3. Prize: Christine Hoba
- 2003 1. Prize: Omar Saavedra Santis; 2. Prize: Clemens Meyer; 3. Prize: Nils Mohl
- 2004 1. Prize: Bov Bjerg; 2. Prize: Jonas-Philipp Dallmann; 3. Prize: Martin Gülich; Audience Prize: Bov Bjerg
- 2005 1. Prize: Silvio Huonder; 2. Prize: Martin Gülich; 3. Prize: Gunter Gerlach
- 2006 1. Prize: Thomas Pletzinger; 2. Prize: Natalie Balkow; 3. Prize: Nils Mohl; Audience Prize: Thomas Pletzinger
- 2007 1. Prize: Moritz Heger; 2. Prize: Margarita Fuchs; 3. Prize: Philip Meinhold; Audience Prize: Moritz Heger
- 2008 1. Prize: Sudabeh Mohafez; 2. Prize: Bernd Hans Martens; 3. Prize: Ralf Eggers; Audience Prize: Finn-Ole Heinrich
- 2009 1. Prize: Katharina Hartwell; 2. Prize: Andreas Stichmann; 3. Prize: Stefan Petermann; Audience Prize: Stefan Petermann
- 2010 1. Prize: Leif Randt; 2. Prize: Florian Wacker; 3. Prize: Irma Krauß; Audience Prize: Diana Feuerbach
- 2011 1. Prize: Matthias Nawrat; 2. Prize: Susanne Neuffer; 3. Prize: Jesse Falzoi; Audience Prize: Simone Kanter
- 2012 1. Prize: Gianna Molinari; 2. Prize: Ursula Kirchenmayer; 3. Prize: Alina Herbing; Audience Prize: Gianna Molinari
- 2013 1. Prize: Anja Kampmann; 2. Prize: Ferdinand Schmalz; 3. Prize: Verena Güntner; Audience Prize: Peter Wawerzinek
- 2014 1. Prize: Stefan Ferdinand Etgeton; 2. Prize: Sarah J. Ablett; 3. Prize: Kathrin Schmidt; Audience Prize: Stefan Ferdinand Etgeton
- 2015 1. Prize: Ronya Othmann; 2. Prize: Irina Kilimnik; 3. Prize: Anja Dolatta; Audience Prize: Irina Kilimnik
