= Abbas Khadir =

Iraqi-born German author (born 1973)

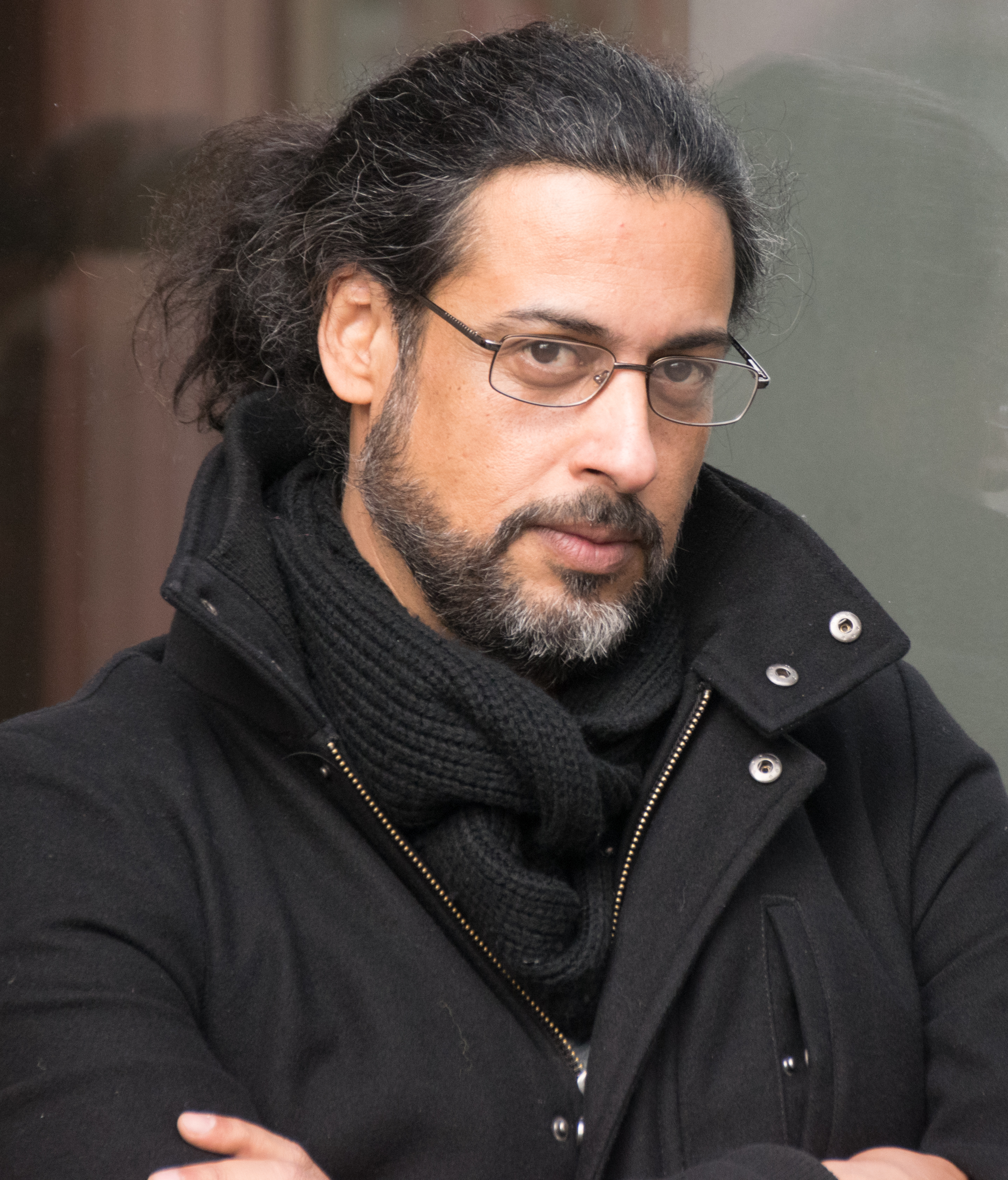
- Born: 3 March 1973 (age 53); Baghdad, Iraq
- Education: LMU Munich University of Potsdam
- Occupations: Writer, poet
- Writing career
- Language: Arabic, German
- Genres: Novel, poetry
- Notable awards: Adelbert von Chamisso Prize (2010 and 2017); Hilde Domin Prize (2013); Nelly Sachs Prize (2013); Spycher Prize (2016); Mainzer Stadtschreiber (2017)
- Website: www.abbaskhider.com

Abbas Khadir (born 3 March 1973; German: Abbas Khider; Arabic:عباس خضر) is a German author and poet of Iraqi origin. He was imprisoned for his political activism against the regime of Saddam Hussein and took refuge in a number of countries before he was granted asylum in Berlin in 2000, where he continues to live.

He is mostly known for his novels written in German, for which he received several literary prizes and scholarships, including the Adelbert von Chamisso Prize and the Berlin Prize for Literature.

== Personal life ==
Khadir was born in Baghdad in 1973, and has eight siblings. He was born to illiterate parents who sold dates for a living.

By the age of 14, Khadir started reading religious books, which was the only genre his house possessed. He discovered his love for literature through these religious texts, realizing that they were often figurative in nature. This helped facilitate his reading and understanding of poetry. He found refuge in reading, and it opened doors to rediscovering the world. Through his readings, he "travelled" to Germany with Franz Kafka, to Russia with Alexander Pushkin, and to France with Charles Baudelaire. Despite being educated, none of Khadir's siblings had an interest in literature, except for his sisters and the literary critic, Saleh Zamel, a spouse to one of his sisters. Khadir spent most of his time reading in Zamel's library. There, Khadir discovered many new writers whom he later met personally. He confessed that his love for reading and the inspiration by the works of different authors initially started his desire to write.

== Education ==
During his stay in Germany, Khadir gained the necessary qualifications in order to be admitted to university. In five years’ time, he successfully completed studying in three different educational institutions: an Arabic school, an online school, and a college-preparatory school. He then enrolled at LMU Munich and the University of Potsdam, where he studied literature and philosophy.

== Career ==
Before arriving in Germany, Khadir earned his living with temporary jobs. Upon being granted asylum in Germany, he started his writing profession. In addition to the monetary and institutional support, Khadir was awarded literary prizes and scholarships, which expanded his audience.

In 2014 and in cooperation with other writers, Khadir organized the “Cairo Short Stories” writers’ workshop for outstanding young writers at the Goethe-Institut in Egypt. Out of the 108 participants who submitted their short stories, eleven candidates were shortlisted, and three won. The goal of the workshop was to assist the candidates in their development process as writers by giving them advice. In return, Khadir and the other writers learned about the candidates’ experience as writers who are influenced by both German and Arab culture.

In 2017, when he was nominated for the Mainzer Stadtschreiber literary award, Khadir completed two additional manuscripts, one of which was a humorous exploration of the German language, and the other a novel. Further, Khadir has been hosting a number of reading projects in European and non-European countries.

== His arrest ==
During his high school years, Khadir got involved with people and political activities that opposed the regime of Saddam Hussein, the dictator of Iraq at the time. He sold books that were banned by the government, to which he attached leaflets containing his own writings. Consequently, he was arrested and sentenced to two years’ imprisonment from 1993 to 1995. In 1996, he fled to Jordan, and later moved to a number of Mediterranean countries, including Egypt, Libya, Tunisia, Turkey, Greece and Italy, in which he stayed as an undocumented refugee and lived off temporary jobs. In 2000, he was arrested upon his arrival in Germany by a Bavarian border police officer, and, as per the German asylum law in effect at the time, was prohibited from leaving the country.

== His writings ==
Most of Khadir's writings are based on personal experiences and the experiences of those whom he encountered in life. He gave refugees in Germany a literary voice. His novels explore the gendered nature of power systems, the Kafkaesque dynamics of bureaucracy and the notion of the refugee as the ultimate biopolitical subject. Khadir's originality is reflected in his form and content, and he has expressed concepts, such as self-protection and resistance, in a humorous tone. This led some German critics to describe Khadir as a writer who is committed to stories about outcasts.

For instance, in his second novel, The President's Oranges, Khadir describes prisons in Iraq during Saddam Hussein's rule. In his third novel, Letter to the Aubergine Republic, he narrates the journey of a love letter sent by an exiled Salim in Libya to his beloved Samia in Iraq. Khadir cleverly used the code-name "Aubergine Republic" to refer to Iraq at a time the eggplant was the most prevalent food in the country.

As of 2019, his novels A Slap in the Face and The Village Indian have been published in English translations.

== Works ==
=== Novels ===
- The Village Indian. Translated by Donal McLaughlin, Seagull Books, 2019. (original title in German: Der falsche Inder), Edition Nautilus, Hamburg, 2008.
- "The President's Oranges” (original title in German: Die Orangen des Präsidenten), Edition Nautilus, Hamburg, 2011.
- "Letter to the Aubergine Republic" (original title in German: Brief in die Auberginenrepublik), Edition Nautilus, Hamburg 2013.
- A Slap in the Face. Translated by Simon Pare, Seagull Books, 2018. (original title in German: Ohrfeige), Carl Hanser Verlag, Munich, 2016.
- “Palace of the Miserables” (original title in German: Palast der Miserablen), Carl Hanser Verlag, Munich, 2020.
- "The memory-faker" (original title in German: Der Erinnerungsfälscher), Carl Hanser Verlag, Munich, 2022.
- Der letzte Sommer der Tauben, Carl Hanser Verlag, Munich, 2026.

=== Non-fiction ===
- “German for everyone" (original title: Deutsch für alle. Das endgültige Lehrbuch), Carl Hanser Verlag, Munich, 2020. As a result of the public's constant demand, Khadir compiled numerous stories and lessons on how to develop a cosmopolitan outlook and humor in this book. Khadir went from knowing only three German words (Hitler, Scheiße and Lufthansa) to reading German philosophers, like Kant, Hegel and Hölderlin. In his satire, he answers curious questions about the grammatical rules of the German language, such as the reason adjectives are changed to match the noun, and the reason behind the multiplicity of German prepositions. He sees this "texbook" to be the first step to changing the world, and, by using a satirical tone, brings forth a new style of the German language for expats, migrants and Germans themselves.

== Awards ==
=== Prizes ===
- Adelbert von Chamisso Prize, promotional prizes, 2010
- Hilde Domin Prize, 2013
- Nelly Sachs Prize, 2013
- 2013: Ten-week London scholarship from the German Literature Fund, as Writer-in-Residence at Queen Mary University of London (autumn 2014)
- Spycher Prize, 2016
- Mainzer Stadtschreiber, 2017
- Adelbert von Chamisso Prize, 2017
- Berlin Prize for Literature, 2025

=== Scholarships ===
- Alfred Döblin Scholarship, 2009
- German Literature Fund working grant, 2010
- Robert Bosch Foundation working grant, 2011
- Villa Aurora scholarship, 2011
- Edenkoben Künstlerhaus Scholarship, 2013
- Cross-border commuter scholarship, 2013
- London Scholarship, 2013
- Berlin Senate Scholarship, 2015
- Comburg Literature Scholarship, 2019
- German Literature Fund working grant, 2019

=== Lectureships ===
- Poetics lecture at the University of Koblenz and Landau, 2013.
- Visiting lecturer at Heinrich Heine University Düsseldorf, 2016.

== Literature ==
- Coury, David N., and Karolin Machtans. Abbas Khider. Peter Lang Ltd. International Academic Publishers, 2021. ISBN 978-1-78997-490-4
