= Güney Dal =

Turkish-German writer (born 1944)

Güney Dal (born 1944, in Çanakkale) is a Turkish-German writer. He has worked as journalist for the radio and television service Sender Freies Berlin.

== Family ==
His children, who are named Ceren Dal (born 1973) and Sophie Dal (born 1981), are both actors.

== Awards ==
- 1976 Romanpreis des Verlages Milliyat (Istanbul)
- 1980 Literaturstipendium des Berliner Senats
- 1983 Literaturstipendium des Berliner Senats
- 1985 Literaturstipendium des Berliner Senats
- 1997 Adelbert-von-Chamisso-Preis
