= Andriy Meronyk =

Ukrainian writer

- Андрій Мероник
- Andriy Meronyk in 2024
- Born: October 26, 1993 (age 33); Borshchiv, Ternopil Oblast, Ukraine
- Education: Yuriy Fedkovych Chernivtsi National University (BSc); National University of Kyiv-Mohyla Academy (MSc)
- Occupations: Writer, public figure
- Notable work: “24.02” (2022) “The Seventh Company: Laugh or Cry” (2025)

Andriy Ivanovych Meronyk (Ukrainian: Андрій Іванович Мероник; born October 26, 1993) is a Ukrainian writer and public figure. The author of the war diary '24.02' (2022), the book series 'The Seventh Company: Laugh or Cry' (2025), and other literary and publicistic works.

In his civic activities, he is engaged in charitable initiatives related to book publishing and supporting the Armed Forces of Ukraine. In 2022, he initiated the art campaign 'Street Art Against Dictatorship'. In 2025, he was awarded a Presidential scholarship for young writers.

== Biography and education ==
Meronyk was born in Borshchiv, Ternopil Oblast, Ukraine. He earned a bachelor’s degree at the Department of Mathematical Problems of Control and Cybernetics of Yuriy Fedkovych Chernivtsi National University and a master’s degree in “Systems and Methods of Decision-Making” at the National University of Kyiv-Mohyla Academy.

== Writing career ==
=== Early books (2020–2021) ===
- Meronyk’s first book, “The Golden Grail of Cryptocurrency Trading” (Золотий ґрааль криптовалютного трейдингу), was published by Knyhy–XXI in Chernivtsi in 2020. An English translation was published in 2021.
- His second book, “69 Unsuccessful Dates” (69 невдалих побачень), published by Knyhy–XXI in 2021, is a non-fiction account of online dating from a male perspective.
- In 2022 Knyhy–XXI published “Why 69” (Чому 69) under the pseudonym “Andriy M.” (Андрій М.).

=== “24.02” (2022–2023) ===
Meronyk began work on “24.02” on February 24, 2022, the day of the full-scale Russian invasion of Ukraine . The book is a war diary. In it he describes how a group of young people found themselves in the midst of the invasion and adapted to the new realities in order to be useful to their country. A separate section collects accounts by Ukrainian entrepreneurs, doctors, bloggers and artists. The book was issued in four editions in 2022–2023 (see Bibliography). In 2022 it was presented at the International Frankfurt Book Fair.

=== Business books (2023) ===
In 2023 Meronyk co-wrote “Toothless Business” (Беззубий бізнес) with the dentist Bohdan Kushnir, a practical guide for dental professionals and newcomers on how to open their own clinic.

=== “The Seventh Company” (2025) ===
In 2025 Meronyk published “The Seventh Company: Laugh or Cry” (Сьома рота. Сміх і сльози), a collection of stories about soldiers’ lives during the war. It was published in Chernivtsi by Knyhy–XXI. A second and third part were published in 2025. The books include a section titled “Credits” (Титри) that names Ukrainian soldiers killed in the war. An English-language edition, “The Seventh Company: Laugh or Cry”, was published in 2025.

=== Audiobooks ===
Audiobook editions of “69 Unsuccessful Dates”, “24.02” and all three parts of “The Seventh Company: Laugh or Cry” have been released, all narrated by Meronyk himself.

=== Other works ===
His short story “Symbol of Freedom” (Символ волі), which deals with the formation of Ukrainian national identity, appeared in the January 2023 print issue of Ukrainian Literary Newspaper.

== Charity and public activity ==
=== Fundraising through his books ===
- “24.02” was not sold but offered in exchange for voluntary donations. According to a press release published by the news agency UNIAN in January 2024, the project had raised more than 1 million hryvnias by the end of 2023.
- “The Seventh Company” follows the same model. Suspilne reported in March 2025 that all proceeds from the book would go to the Armed Forces and to people affected by Russian aggression. In February 2026 the news outlet Shotam reported that he had raised ₴3 million for the military and for people affected by the war by exchanging his books for donations.
- Meronyk organized a charity campaign titled “We win by reading” (Перемагаємо, читаючи), in which books about the war were exchanged for donations.
- Between October 17 and November 1, 2023, he presented “24.02” at events in Gdańsk, Kraków, Berlin, Frankfurt am Main and Leipzig, held to raise funds for the Armed Forces of Ukraine.

=== “Litboosters” ===
In December 2023 Meronyk initiated and organized “Litboosters” (Літбустери), a literary flash mob in which 24 singers, actors, bloggers, TV presenters and entrepreneurs took part. According to the literary website Bukvoid, more than ₴150,000 was raised in the first two days.

=== “Street Art Against Dictatorship” ===
In June 2022 the art campaign “Street Art Against Dictatorship” (Стріт-арт проти диктатури) was launched in Kyiv. Its posters ridiculed Russian president Vladimir Putin. Meronyk was the initiator and author of the idea of the campaign.

== Bibliography ==
=== Books ===
2020

- “The Golden Grail of Cryptocurrency Trading” (Золотий ґрааль криптовалютного трейдингу) – Knyhy–XXI, Chernivtsi – ISBN 978-617-614-290-4 – 176 pages

2021

- “The Golden Grail of Cryptocurrency Trading”, English translation – ISBN 9798771676562 – 176 pages
- “69 Unsuccessful Dates” (69 невдалих побачень) – Knyhy–XXI, Chernivtsi – ISBN 978-617-614-339-0 – 224 pages

2022

- “24.02” – Knyhy–XXI, Chernivtsi – ISBN 978-617-614-378-9 – 328 pages. First and second print runs.
- “Why 69” (Чому 69), published as Andriy M. – Knyhy–XXI, Chernivtsi – ISBN 978-617-614-386-4 – 368 pages

2023

- “24.02” (revised edition) – Knyhy–XXI, Chernivtsi – ISBN 978-617-614-399-4 – 344 pages. Third and the fourth print runs.
- “Toothless Business” (Беззубий бізнес), with Bohdan Kushnir – Knyhy–XXI, Chernivtsi – ISBN 978-617-614-429-8 – 208 pages

2025

- “The Seventh Company. Laugh or Cry” (Сьома рота. Сміх і сльози) – Knyhy–XXI, Chernivtsi – ISBN 978-617-614-687-2 – 200 pages
- “The Seventh Company. Laugh or Cry. Part Two” (Сьома рота. Сміх і сльози. Частина друга) – Knyhy–XXI, Chernivtsi – ISBN 978-617-614-719-0 – 248 pages
- “The Seventh Company. Laugh or Cry. Part Three” (Сьома рота. Сміх і сльози. Частина третя) – Knyhy–XXI, Chernivtsi – ISBN 978-617-614-738-1 – 312 pages
- “The Seventh Company: Laugh or Cry”, English edition – ISBN 9798316174973 – 115 pages

=== Other works ===
- 2023 – “Symbol of Freedom” (Символ волі), short story – Ukrainian Literary Newspaper, January issue

== Recognition and project support ==
- In April 2025 Meronyk was among the young writers granted a Presidential stipend by decree of the President of Ukraine.
- The Seventh Company received support from the Vienna-based Institute for Human Sciences (IWM) through its international Documenting Ukraine programme. The supported projects included The Seventh Company: Laughter and Tears and the third part of the series, both documenting the experiences of Ukrainian soldiers during the Russian invasion of Ukraine.
- The Prydniprovskyi District Court of Cherkasy ordered the accused to read Andriy Meronyk's book '24.02. War Diary' as a condition of their suspended sentence (probationary period). The relevant verdict in case No. 711/5031/23 was issued in the autumn of 2023.
