= Turkish-German cinema =

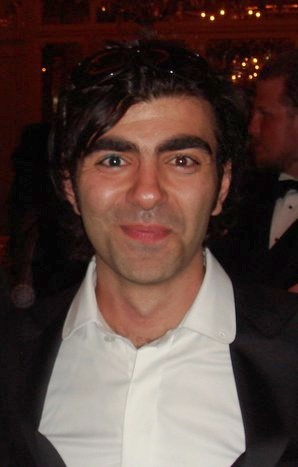
Fatih Akın

Turkish-German Cinema historians and theoreticians of film sometimes call movies out of Germany directed by German-Turkish filmmakers. These films often raise transcultural issues and have some other specific similarities.

Fatih Akın is the most important Director of Turkish-German Movies. Others are for example Yüksel Yavuz, Sinan Akkuş, Buket Alakuş, Thomas Arslan, Hussi Kutlucan, Seyhan Derin, Sülbiye Günar, Neco Çelik, Züli Aladağ, Mennan Yapo, Adnan G. Köse and Özgür Yıldırım.

The first Turk in Germany who did a movie was Tevfik Başer (40 m2 Deutschland).
