= Murat Kaya (writer) =

German comics author (born 1971)

Murat Kaya (15 February 1971) is a German comics author.

Kaya was born in Hamburg, and worked for the German version of MAD.

== Awards ==
In 2005, Kaya's illustration of the theme "Der Markenwahn: Deutschlands teure Kinder" ("Brand mania: Germany's expensive children") ranked fourth in an art workshop from German newspaper Der Spiegel.

== Works ==
- Überleben mit Heuschnupfen (2001)
- Liebesgrüße von der Ex (2003)
