= Şadi Üçüncü =

Şadi Üçüncü (1948, Turkey – 2004, Germany) was a Turkish-German writer.

After high school and university in Istanbul, Ücüncü moved to Germany in 1974, where he received a doctorate in business administration.

== Works ==
- Die Stellung der Frau in der türkischen Gesellschaft (1979)
- Integrationshemmender Faktor: Ausländerfeindlichkeit in der Bundesrepublik Deutschland (1984)
- "Überblick zur Theorie der Ausländerfeindlichkeit".
- Freund, gib mir deine Hand, 1986
- Fremde in mir (1988).
- Gedichte für Frieden (1991)
- Die Fremdheit in Europa. Gedichte gegen Ausländerhass und über die Liebe (1994).
- Zusammen mit Dir, 2003
