= Şerafettin Yıldız =

Turkish-Austrian writer and translator (born 1953)

Şerafettin Yıldız (born 1953) is a Turkish-Austrian writer and translator. He was born in Sürmene, Turkey, but has lived and worked in Austria since 1978.

He writes mainly books for children and teenagers. He has also published poetry in both Turkish language and German language.

== Works ==
- Herzfinsternis. Gedichte. Baden: Grasl 1998
- Der himmelblaue Gruß. Die Geschichte von Murat, einem türkischen Jungen, der nicht in seiner Heimat aufwächst. 1. Aufl. Wien: Neuer Breitschopf-Verl. 1995
- Meine rotzige Hoffnung = Sümüklü umudum. Wien: Verl. Der Apfel 1989
- "Schulberatungsstelle für MigrantInnen (SBM). Eine unverzichtbare Adresse in der Wiener Bildungslandschaft". In: Sertl, Michael (Red.): Integration? Migration, Rassismus, Zweisprachigkeit. Innsbruck ; Wien: Studienverlag, S. 114 - 118 (= Schulheft 114), 1991
- "Auf der Flucht, Fremdsein, Die Rückkehr des Wanderherzen". In: Grazer Autorenversammlung: Sichten und Vernichten. Von der Kontinuität der Gewalt. Wien: Verl. für Gesellschaftskritik 1994
