= Zehra Çırak =

Turkish-German writer

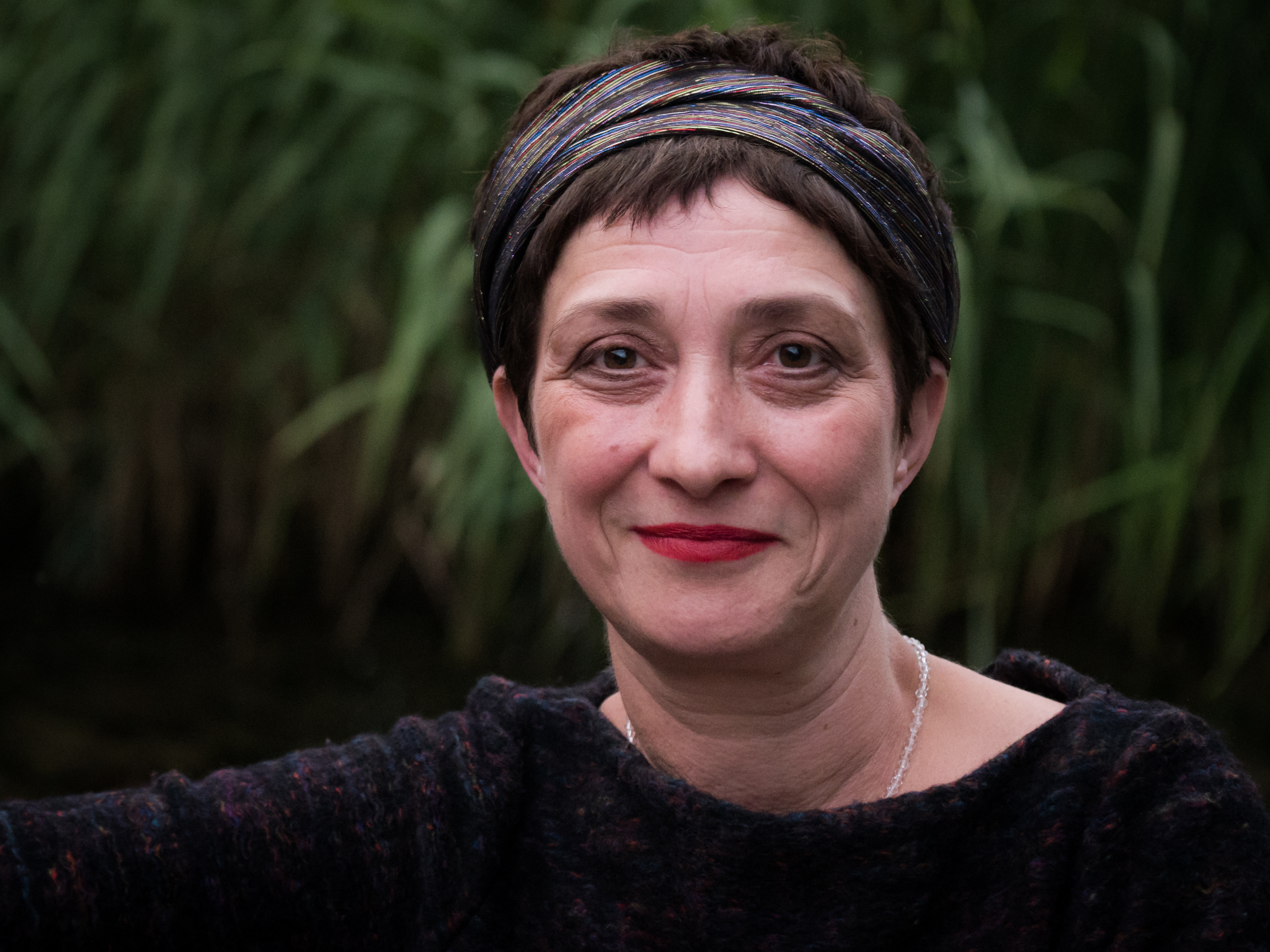
Çırak in 2017

Zehra Çırak (Istanbul, 1960) is a Turkish-German writer. She moved to Germany with her family when she was three years old, and grew up in Karlsruhe. She has lived in Berlin since 1982. She started publishing in the magazine Flugfänger. Çırak was awarded the Friedrich-Hölderlin-Förderpreis in 1993 and the Adelbert von Chamisso Prize in 2001. In 2004 she won the Hölderlin Prize, and the Poetry Award of Amistade Multietnica Poeta Anima Istranza, Olbia in 2005.

== Life ==
Zehra Çırak was born in Istanbul in Turkey in 1960. She moved to Germany with her family when she was three years old and she has lived in Berlin since 1982. She started publishing in the magazine Flugfänger. She leads writing workshops in schools. Çırak was awarded the Friedrich-Hölderlin-Förderpreis in 1993 and the Adelbert von Chamisso Prize in 2001. She was awarded the Hölderlin Prize in 1994. In 2005 Çırak won the Poetry Award of Amistade Multietnica Poeta Anima Istranza, Olbia. In 2016 she won the Tübingen Writer-in-Residence Award.

Her published poetry collections include Flugfänger (1987), Vogel auf dem Rucken eines Elefanten: Gedichte (Bird on the back of an elephant, 1991), and Frende Flügel auf eigener Schulter (Foreign wings on familiar shoulders, 1994), and Leibesübungen (Abdominal exercises, 2000). Her work is known for succinctness and wordplay.

Çırak is known to reject the label of Turkish-German, and prefers to think of herself as a Berliner.

== Personal life ==
Çırak was married to, and sometimes collaborated with, visual artist Jürgen Walter, who died in 2014.

== Works ==
- Flugfänger, Gedichte, Edition artinform, 1988
- Vogel auf dem Rücken eines Elefanten, Gedichte, Kiepenheuer & Witsch, Köln 1991
- Fremde Flügel auf eigener Schulter, Gedichte, Kiepenheuer & Witsch, Köln 1994
- Leibesübungen, Gedichte, Verlag Kiepenheuer & Witsch, Köln 2000
- In Bewegung, Gedichte und Prosaminiaturen Verlag Hans Schiler, Berlin 2008
- Der Geruch von Glück, Erzählungen, Verlag Hans Schiler, Berlin 2011

== Awards ==
- Friedrich-Hölderlin-Förderpreis, 1993
- Adelbert von Chamisso Prize, 2001
