= Maria Anna Katharina Rutowska =

Maria Anna Katharina
- Countess Rutowska
- Born: 1706
- Died: 1746 (aged 39–40)
- Spouses: Count Michał Bieliński; Comte Claude Marie de Bellegarde et d'Entremont
- Issue: Frédérique Augusta Marie de Bellegarde; Moritz de Bellegarde
Names
- Maria Anna Katharina Rutowska
- House: Wettin
- Father: Frederick Augustus I, Elector of Saxony
- Mother: Fatima (Maria Anna von Spiegel)

Maria Anna Katharina Rutowska (1706–1746) was a Polish noblewoman. She was the illegitimate daughter of Augustus II the Strong, ruler of Saxony and Poland–Lithuania, and his mistress, the Turk Fatima or Fatime, later renamed Maria Aurora von Spiegel.

== Life ==
Katharina was the second child of the liaison between Augustus II and Fatima; her older brother, Frederick Augustus, was born four years before.

Shortly after the birth of Frederick Augustus, the King married Maria Anna to his chamberman Johann Georg (von) Spiegel, but she remained as his mistress. Katharina was born during this marriage and legally used the name Maria Anna Katharina von Spiegel during her first years of life.

In 1715, her stepfather Johann Georg of Spiegel died. Augustus II took the guardianship of his children, but only recognized and legitimized both in 1724 and they were granted the title of Count and Countess Rutowska.

The now Countess Rutowska was married off by her father on 1 October 1724 to the Polish nobleman Count Michał Bieliński. The marriage was an immediate failure and after eight unhappy years, in early 1732, they divorced.

In 1737, she re-married, this time, a Savoyard aristocrat in Saxon service, Count Claude Marie de Bellegarde et d'Entremont (1700–1755). From this marriage she has two children: one son, Mauritz de Bellegarde (1743–1792), general-lieutenant in service of Saxe, and one daughter, Frédérique Augusta Marie de Bellegarde, named after her maternal grandparents, who married François Sébastien de Chevron-Villette, called the Comte de Villette, on 27 April 1779. Their marriage was childless.

Contrary to what is written in several works, she did not die in 1746. From 1746 to 1752, she was in Turin with her husband the Count of Bellegarde, who was ambassador of Saxony.
