= Frederick Augustus Rutowsky =

Frederick Augustus
- Count Rutowsky
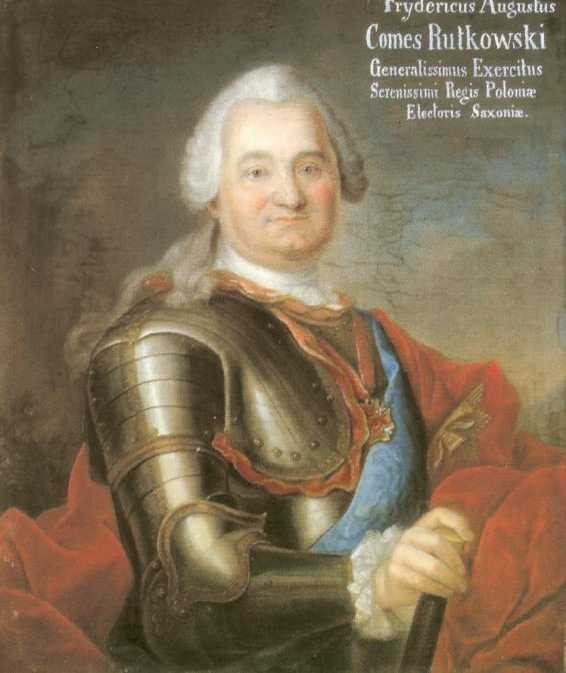
- Born: 19 June 1702; Warsaw/Dresden
- Died: 16 March 1764 (aged 61); Pillnitz
- Spouse: Princess Ludovika Amalie Lubomirska
- Issue: August Joseph, Count Rutowsky
- House: Wettin
- Father: Frederick Augustus I, Elector of Saxony
- Mother: Fatima (Maria Anna of Spiegel)

Frederick Augustus, Count Rutowsky (also written Rutowski) (Warsaw/Dresden [?], 19 June 1702 – Pillnitz, 16 March 1764), was a Saxon field marshal who commanded Saxon forces in the Siege of Pirna during the Seven Years' War.

== Life ==
=== Early years ===
He was an illegitimate son of August the Strong, King of Poland, Grand Duke of Lithuania and Elector of Saxony, and his mistress Fatima (or Fatime) who was of Turkish origin. His mother was captured during the Battle of Buda. She was baptized in Stockholm at the Tyska kyrka on November 7th the same year and was named after her godmother Maria Aurora von Königsmarck.

The child got the name of his father, but shortly after the birth Fatima was married at the instigation of Augustus to his chamberman Johann Georg of Spiegel. Frederick Augustus moved to the estates of the Spiegel Family, but his father cared about his education, which led him among other things to go to Paris, where he found his half-sister Anna Karolina (the later countess Orzelska) and brought her to Dresden.

Fatima, despite her marriage, remained a mistress of Augustus. In 1706, she gave birth to the King's second child, a daughter, called Maria Anna Katharina. However, soon Frederick Augustus and his sister became orphans: Johann Georg of Spiegel died in 1715 and their mother Fatima five years later.

Augustus the Strong took the guardianship of the children, but he only recognized and legitimized them both in 1724. Shortly after, he raised both, as his right of King of Poland, with the Polish title of Count Rutowski and Countess Rutowska. The coat of arms awarded to them shows a Saxon rhombus wreath as well as a Polish White Eagle.

On 8 October 1724 Frederick August, now Count Rutowski, obtained of his father the highest decoration of the Wettin lands, the Order of the White Eagle, which gave him the rank of an Oberst of the Saxon Army.

== Military career ==
After a journey to Munich and Venice, Rutowski arrived in February 1725 at the court of the King of Sardinia and Duke of Savoy, Victor Amadeus II in Turin, where he took command of the Piedmont regiment and was garrisoned in Alessandria. It is possible his enjoyment of this city prompted him to write his father, asking permission to enter in French services in order to remain in Turin. His father refused this request and demanded his return.

On 26 May 1727 he became a Major-General in the Saxon Army and shortly after he served under the Prussians; however, in 1729 he returned again to the Saxon Army. During the following years, in the War of Polish Succession, he participated in the campaigns in Poland and on the Rhine, becoming Lieutenant-General on 1 January 1736 and Commander of the Garde du Corps. As such he was in 1737 the leader of the Saxon Contingent in the War against the Turks in Hungary.

On 21 April 1738 he became General of the Cavalry, on 9 August 1740 Governor of Dresden and Commander of the Grenadier Guard, Obristhaus on 10 August and Landzeugmeister. On 10 January 1742 he was appointed Commander of a Dragoon's Regiment.

During the First Silesian War he commanded the Saxon troops in Bohemia and participated on the 26 November 1742 in the storming of Prague. Frederick Augustus commanded the troops which stayed behind in Saxony, and fought with these troops and the biggest part of the Saxon Army coming back from Bohemia the battle of Kesselsdorf near Dresden (15 December 1745), where they suffered a crucial defeat in the Second Silesian War against the Prince Leopold I of Anhalt-Dessau.

On 6 January 1746 he was ranked General en Chef, and on 11 January 1749, at last, he was appointed Field Marshal. During the next peace years, he did not succeed in spite of multiple efforts, to avert the cutbacks in the Saxon Army by the prime minister Brühl, which seriously reduced its effectiveness.

=== Siege of Pirna ===
At the sudden outbreak of the Seven Years' War, he concentrated the Saxon Army of only 18,100 men in a strong defensive position near Pirna. He withstood a siege of 6 weeks, but had to capitulate on 16 October 1756, and became a prisoner of King Frederick II of Prussia.

During the years of war Rutowsky stayed in Saxony and renounced all his military functions directly after the Treaty of Hubertusburg on 8 March 1763. He died one year later, aged sixty-one.

== Marriage and issue ==
On 4 January 1739 Frederick Augustus married the Princess Ludovika Amalie Lubomirska. Their only child, August Joseph, Count Rutowsky (b. 2 August 1741) died of smallpox in Brunswick, 17 January 1755.
