= Maria Aurora von Spiegel =

Ottoman Empire politician

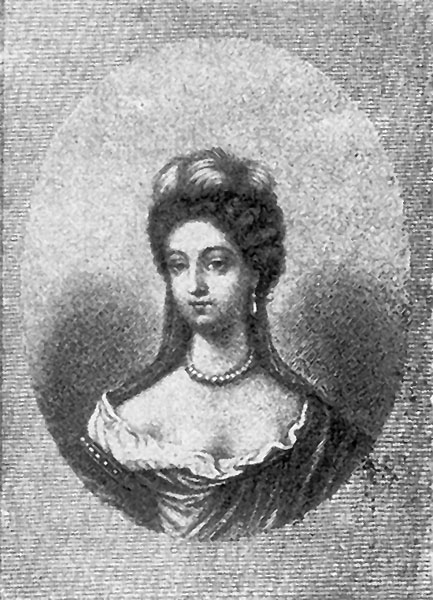
Fatima Kariman

Maria Aurora von Spiegel, born Fatima (born before 1686 – fl 1733), also referred to as Fatime, Fatima Kariman or Fatima von Kariman, was the Ottoman Turkish mistress of Augustus II the Strong of Poland and Lithuania. Fatima was one of the many Turkish captives during the Battle of Buda. She was brought to the royal courts of Europe, including Sweden, Polish-Lithuanian Commonwealth, and Saxony, and trained as a lady-in-waiting.

== Life ==
=== Early life ===
Maria Aurora was captured by the imperial army that took the slaves and property belonging to the Turks after the successful Imperial reconquest of Buda from the Ottoman Empire after the Siege of Buda (1686) during the Great Turkish war. A Swede in Austrian service, Baron Alexander Erskin was given four Turkish women as a part of his loot: Raziye (Roosia); Asiye (Eisia); Emine; and Fatma (Fatima). Fatima stated that she had been "married" to a "Muhammedan Priest" (referring to a mullah, a Muslim clergyman).

Baron Erskin returned to Sweden with Philip Christoph von Königsmarck, and gave Fatima and the other captives to Philip's sister, Countess Maria Aurora von Königsmarck. If not before, they would have been automatically free upon arrival within Swedish borders, since Sweden had abolished slavery in 1335. The four women were baptised in Stockholm on 7 November 1686 at the royal court. Crown Prince Charles and Aurora von Königsmarck stood as Fatima's godparents, and she was christened Maria Aurora after the countess.

She was taught etiquette and French and became a lady's companion to Aurora von Königsmarck.

=== Royal mistress ===
In 1691 she followed her mistress to Saxony and the Polish-Lithuanian Commonwealth, where Aurora von Königsmarck became the royal mistress of King Augustus. She was often present at the King's visits to Aurora von Königsmarck, and in 1701 she replaced Aurora as the royal mistress. Augustus married her in 1706 to Johann George Spiegel who died in 1715 shortly before arrest at the Festung Sonnenstein.

Augustus acknowledged his children with her, which he did not do with all of his mistresses, and seemed to have been in love with her. He often returned to her between his other relationships. She bore him a son and a daughter who each married into European nobility.

She was the mother by King Augustus of Count Frederick Augustus Rutowsky and Countess Katharina Rutowska (born in 1706), who married Major-General Count Claudius Maria von Bellegarde (born in Piedmont, died in France in 1755), an ambassador to the court of Turin.

=== Later life ===
She remained a central character within the royal court after her relationship with Augustus ended, and was good friends with the influential Przebendowska, a relation of the favourite Count Fleming. At the king's death in 1733, she was given an allowance of 8000 thaler in his will.

== In popular culture ==
The Porcelain Menagerie, a historical novel by Jillian Forsberg, depicts Maria Aurora von Spiegel (born Fatima) within the Dresden court of Augustus II the Strong, alongside Johann Joachim Kändler and the creation of the famous porcelain menagerie.
