= Angélique Debargues =

French ballerina and actress

Angelique Debargues
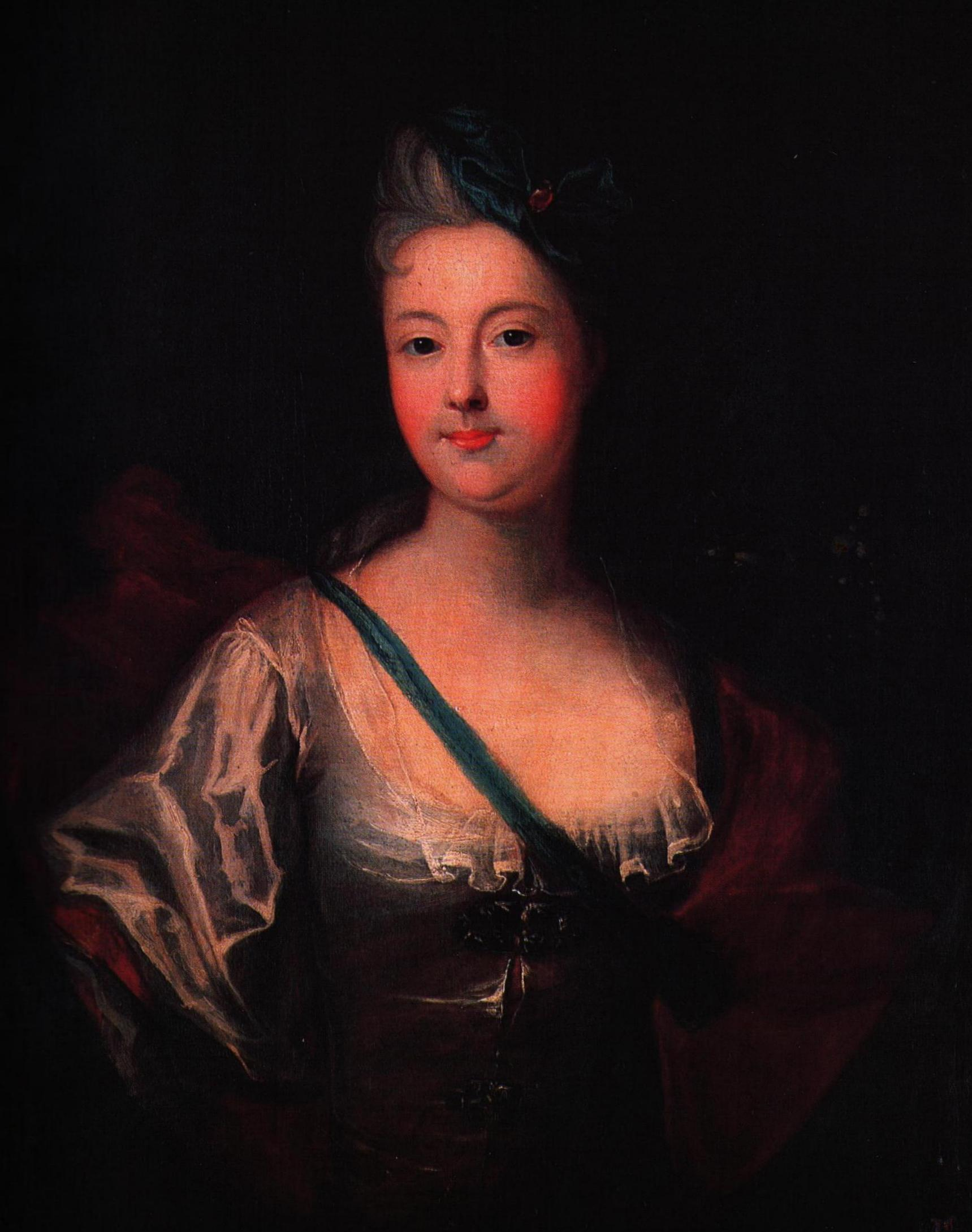
- Died: 1724
- Occupation: Ballerina
- Known for: Mistress of Augustus II the Strong
- Spouse: Charles Debargues

Angélique Debargues (died 1724), was a French ballerina. She is known as the mistress of Augustus II the Strong in the 1710s.

Debargues was a prominent ballerina and a star of the French company at the royal court in 1709-1724, during which she was described as the most noted ballerina in the French theater in Dresden, Electorate of Saxony.

== Biography ==
Angélique was married to the ballet master Charles Debargues. Initially, she worked as a dancer at the Opera in Brussels, Austrian Netherlands. In November 1708, the King of Poland and Elector of Saxony, August II the Strong, came to Brussels, traveling under an assumed name, Count de Torgau. The ruler persuaded both Debargues to come to Dresden and only there, according to Karl Ludwig von Pöllnitz's La Saxe Galante, revealed his true identity to the ballerina. On 24 June 1709, the king officially accepted both of them into his service. Angélique and her husband's salary amounted to 1,200 thalers per year, and with time it was increased to 2,000.

In Dresden, Angélique became a royal mistress, and according to one rumor, the ruler gave her a theatrical costume decorated with diamonds. On 30 April 1714, for unknown reasons, August II dismissed Angélique and her husband from service at his court, but on 1 July 1715, they were once again part of the royal dance group. In 1720, Angélique and Charles arrived in Warsaw, where they took part in a series of French performances.

The Debargues most likely inhabited the Royal Castle at that time. At the end of the year, however, they had to return to Dresden, where in the carnival of 1721 they performed in the Mirtil pastoral. In October 1721, Angélique's husband died in Dresden. After she was widowed, Debargues received an annual salary of 1,000 thalers. In 1724, she appeared at the court of Dresden for the last time. The son of Caspar, who was the wardrobe inspector at the Dresden theater in 1732–1744, was probably the son of Angélique's marriage to Charles Debargues.

Angélique Debargues was described as one of the most outstanding dancers in the royal group. Writer Johann Michael von Loen described her as "unmatched in the speed and dexterity of rotation." Ádám Mányoki's portrait of the prima ballerina is in the collection of the Palace on the Island in the Royal Łazienki Park in Warsaw. Another image of the dancer was included in the English version of Karl Ludwig von Pöllnitz's La Saxe Galante from 1929.
