= Augustus II the Strong =

King of Poland, Elector of Saxony and Grand Duke of Lithuania (1670–1733)

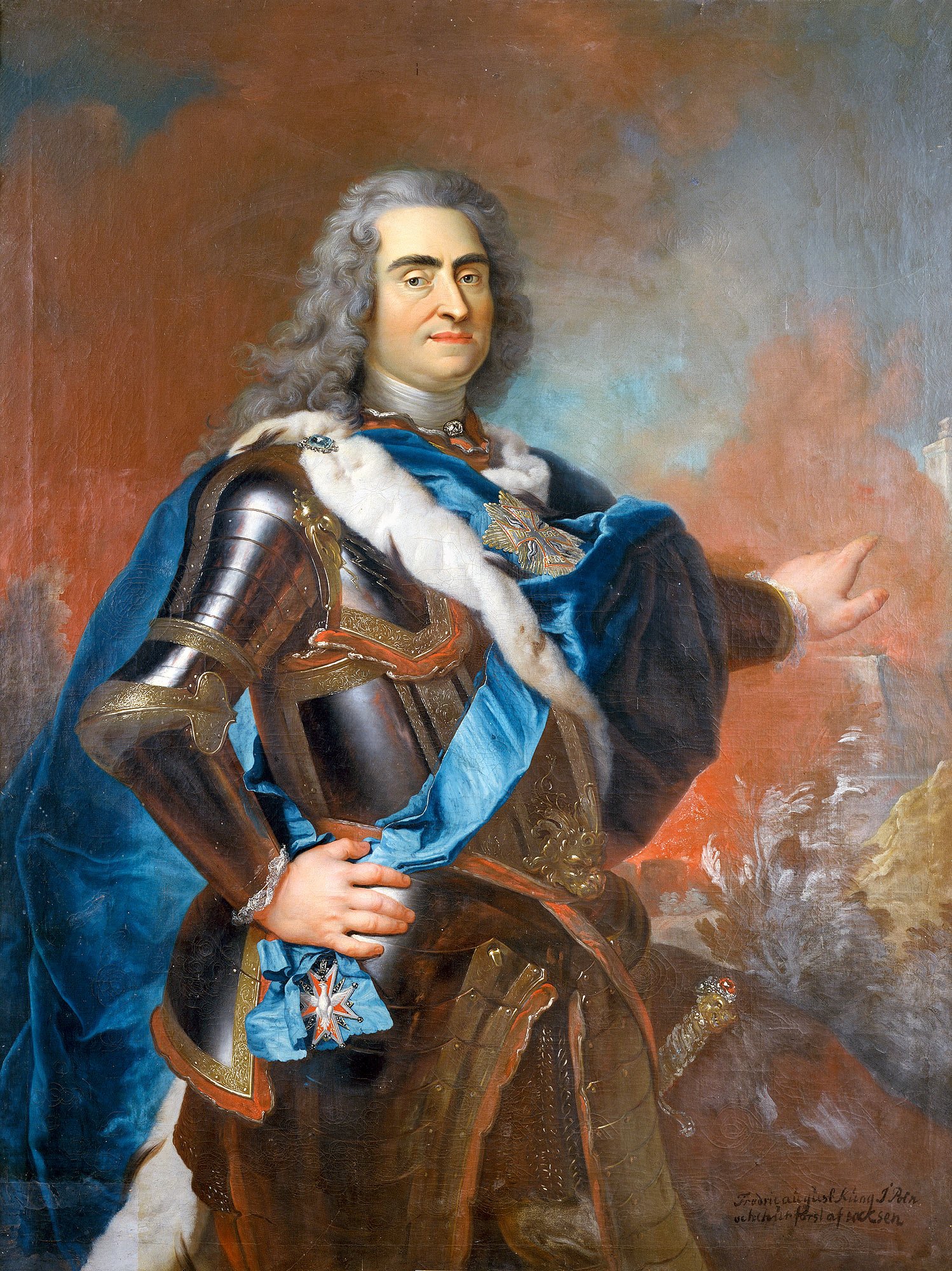
- Portrait of Augustus with the star of the Polish Order of the White Eagle, by Louis de Silvestre

Elector of Saxony
- Reign: 27 April 1694 – 1 February 1733
- Predecessor: John George IV
- Successor: Frederick Augustus II

King of Poland Grand Duke of Lithuania
- Reign: 15 September 1697 – 13 October 1706 (Note: Contested by Stanisław Leszczyński since 12 July 1704.)
- Coronation: 15 September 1697; Wawel Cathedral
- Predecessor: John III Sobieski
- Successor: Stanisław Leszczyński
- Reign: 9 October 1709 – 1 February 1733
- Predecessor: Stanisław Leszczyński
- Successor: Stanisław Leszczyński
- Born: 12 May 1670; Dresden, Electorate of Saxony, Holy Roman Empire
- Died: 1 February 1733 (aged 62); Warsaw, Poland, Polish–Lithuanian Commonwealth
- Burial: Dresden Cathedral, Dresden (heart); Wawel Cathedral, Kraków (body); Church of the Transfiguration, Warsaw (viscera)
- Spouse: Christiane Eberhardine of Brandenburg-Bayreuth (m. 1693; died 1727)
- Issue Detail: Augustus III of Poland; Illegitimate: Maurice de Saxe; Johann Georg, Chevalier de Saxe; Frederick Augustus Rutowsky; Maria Anna Katharina Rutowska; Anna Karolina Orzelska
- House: Wettin (Albertine line)
- Father: John George III, Elector of Saxony
- Mother: Princess Anna Sophie of Denmark
- Religion: Catholicism (from 1697); Lutheran (until 1697)
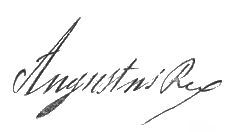
- Signature

Augustus II the Strong (Note: Polish: August II Mocny; German: August der Starke; Lithuanian: Augustas II; enumerated after Sigismund Augustus.) (12 May 1670 – 1 February 1733), was Elector of Saxony as Frederick Augustus I (German: Friedrich August I) from 1694 as well as King of Poland and Grand Duke of Lithuania from 1697 to 1706 and from 1709 until his death in 1733. He belonged to the Albertine branch of the House of Wettin.

Augustus' great physical strength earned him the nicknames "the Strong", "the Saxon Hercules" and "Iron-Hand". He liked to show that he lived up to his name by breaking horseshoes with his bare hands and engaging in fox tossing by holding the end of his sling with just one finger while two of the strongest men in his court held the other end. He is also notable for fathering a very large number of children, with contemporary sources claiming a total of between 360 and 380.

In order to be elected king of the Polish–Lithuanian Commonwealth, Augustus converted to Catholicism. As a Catholic, he received the Order of the Golden Fleece from the Holy Roman Emperor and established the Order of the White Eagle, Poland's highest distinction. As elector of Saxony, he is perhaps best remembered as a patron of the arts and architecture. He transformed the Saxon capital of Dresden into a major cultural centre, attracting artists from across Europe to his court. Augustus also amassed an impressive art collection and built lavish baroque palaces in Dresden and Warsaw. In 1711, he served as the Imperial vicar of the Holy Roman Empire.

His reign brought about many troubles to Poland. He led the Polish–Lithuanian Commonwealth in the Great Northern War, which allowed the Russian Empire to strengthen its influence in Europe, especially within Poland. His main pursuit was bolstering royal power in the Commonwealth, characterised by broad decentralisation in comparison with other European monarchies. In order to reduce the autonomy of the Commonwealth's subjects, he used foreign powers, leading to the destabilisation of the country. Augustus ruled Poland with a 3-year interruption between 1706 and 1709; in 1704, the Swedes installed nobleman Stanisław Leszczyński as king, who officially reigned from 1706 to 1709 and then after Augustus' death in 1733, which sparked the War of the Polish Succession.

Augustus' body was buried in Poland's royal Wawel Cathedral in Kraków, but his heart rests in the Dresden Cathedral. His only legitimate son, Augustus III of Poland, became king in 1733.

== Early life ==
Augustus was born in Dresden on 12 May 1670, the younger son of John George III, Elector of Saxony and Princess Anna Sophie of Denmark. As the second son, Augustus had no expectation of inheriting the electorate, since his older brother, John George IV, assumed the post after the death of their father on 12 September 1691. Augustus was well educated, and spent some years in travel and in fighting against France.

Augustus married Christiane Eberhardine of Brandenburg-Bayreuth in Bayreuth on 20 January 1693. They had a son, Augustus III of Poland (1696–1763), who succeeded his father as Elector of Saxony and King of Poland as Augustus III.

While in Venice during the carnival season, his older brother, the Elector John George IV, contracted smallpox from his mistress Magdalena Sibylla of Neidschutz. On 27 April 1694, Johann Georg died without legitimate issue and Augustus became elector of Saxony, as Friedrich Augustus I.

== On the Hungarian battlefield of the Great Turkish War ==
As a prince elector, as the commander-in-chief of the troops of the Holy Roman Empire fighting in Hungary, he participated in the liberation of Hungary from the Turks, but his participation in the operations was not fortunate. The Aulic War Council (Hofkriegsrat) chose him out of necessity in 1695, as the Nine Years' War that had broken out in the meantime forced him to wage a two-front war, so the best generals were commanded to the western front, and in the given situation received the most soldiers from Saxony (12,000 men).

His contemporaries in Hungary did not have a good opinion of him. According to the historian Mihály Cserei, who saw him up close in Transylvania, the young man with great physical strength was very fond of entertainment, drinking and playing cards, but he did not know much about military leadership: “At the table, he would fold the big, strong silver plate together like a piece of paper, he would squeeze the silver cup together so that the wine would come out of it, and he would even tear the big, strong horseshoes apart, being a terrible force. But even if he had as much intelligence as his strength, I would not see any princely virtue in him.”

He was given the task by the Hofkriegsrat to occupy Temesvár in cooperation with General Veterani’s Transylvanian troops after eliminating the mobile Turkish troops in the south. The experienced General Caprara was assigned to him as a mentor. However, everything turned out completely differently. Leaving Pétervárad, he and his troops got lost along the river Maros, while the Turkish army led by Mustafa II occupied the castle of Lippa. Veterani, who was approaching from Transylvania in the meantime, signaled to him that the Sultan's army, which had come between their units, could be destroyed, but Augustus headed towards the river Tisza. This is how it turned out that Veterani was forced to fight alone against the much-outnumbered Sultan's army at Lugos, believing that Augustus was nearby and would help him: "I have just learned that the Sultan is on my neck with all his strength, but Your Majesty's military movements will help in this, helping the cause ashore." The imperial troops defended successfully for a relatively long time, but in the unequal battle it was almost completely destroyed, and the general himself fell.

On 26 August 1696, Augustus clashed with the Sultan's army at Hetény near river Béga: the battle caused heavy losses to both sides (8,000 Turkish, 2,500-3,000 imperial losses, and Field Marshal Donat Heissler died of his wounds a few days after the battle), but it did not change the military situation, nor did Augustus's entire 2 year military activity on the Hungarian battlefield. Fortunately, Augustus resigned from the command in the same year.

== Conversion to Catholicism ==
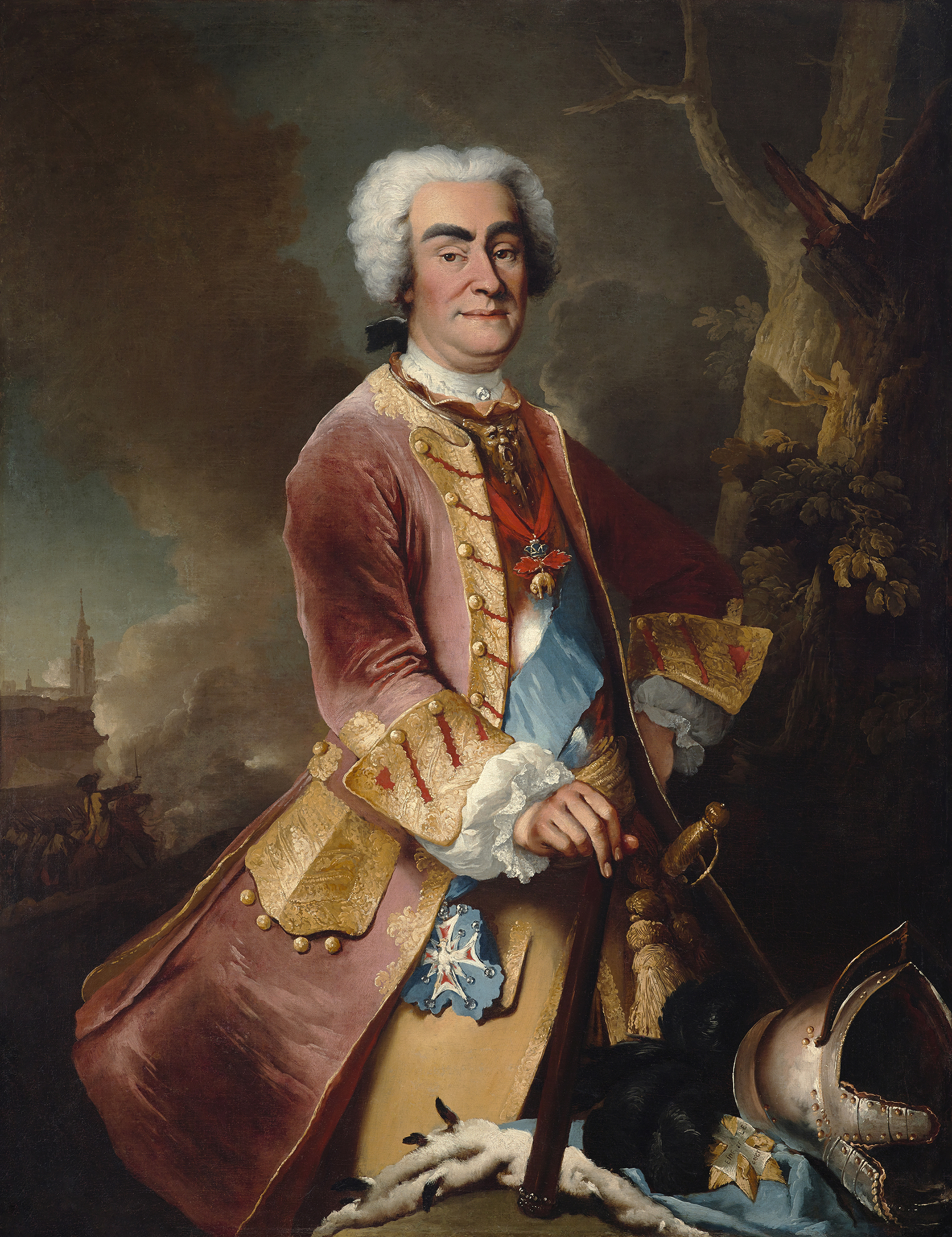
Augustus II by Marcello Bacciarelli

To be eligible for election to the throne of the Polish–Lithuanian Commonwealth in 1697, Augustus had to convert to Roman Catholicism. The Saxon electors had traditionally been called "champions of the Reformation". Christian August of Saxe-Zeitz baptised him and announced his conversion. Saxony had been a stronghold of German Protestantism and Augustus' conversion was therefore considered shocking in Protestant Europe. Although the prince-elector guaranteed Saxony's religious status quo, Augustus' conversion alienated many of his Protestant subjects. As a result of the enormous expenditure of money used to bribe the Polish nobility and clergy, Augustus' contemporaries derisively referred to the Saxon elector's royal ambitions as his "Polish adventure".

His church policy within the Holy Roman Empire followed orthodox Lutheranism and ran counter to his new-found religious and absolutist convictions. The Protestant princes of the empire and the two remaining Protestant electors (of Hanover and Prussia) were anxious to keep Saxony well-integrated in their camp. According to the Peace of Augsburg, Augustus theoretically had the right to re-introduce Roman Catholicism (see Cuius regio, eius religio), or at least grant full religious freedom to his fellow Catholics in Saxony, but this never happened. Saxony remained Lutheran and the few Roman Catholics residing in Saxony lacked any political or civil rights. In 1717, it became clear just how awkward the situation was: to realise his ambitious dynastic plans in Poland and Germany, it was necessary for Augustus' heirs to become Roman Catholic. After five years as a convert, his son — the future Augustus III — publicly avowed his Roman Catholicism. The Saxon Estates were outraged and revolted as it became clear that his conversion to Catholicism was not only a matter of form, but of substance as well.

Since the Peace of Westphalia, the elector of Saxony had been the director of the Protestant body in the Reichstag. To placate the other Protestant states in the Empire, Augustus nominally delegated the directorship of the Protestant body to Johann Adolf II, Duke of Saxe-Weissenfels. However, when the Elector's son also converted to Catholicism, the electorate faced a hereditary Catholic succession instead of a return to a Protestant Elector upon Augustus II's death. When the conversion became public in 1717, Brandenburg–Prussia and Hanover attempted to oust Saxony from the directorship and appoint themselves as joint directors, but they gave up the attempt in 1720. Saxony would retain the directorship of the Protestant body in the Reichstag until the dissolution of the Holy Roman Empire in 1806, despite the fact that all remaining Electors of Saxony were Catholic.

The wife of Augustus II, the Electress Christiane Eberhardine, refused to follow her husband's example and remained a staunch Protestant. She did not attend her husband's coronation in Poland and led a rather quiet life outside Dresden, gaining some popularity for her stubbornness.

== King of Poland for the first time ==
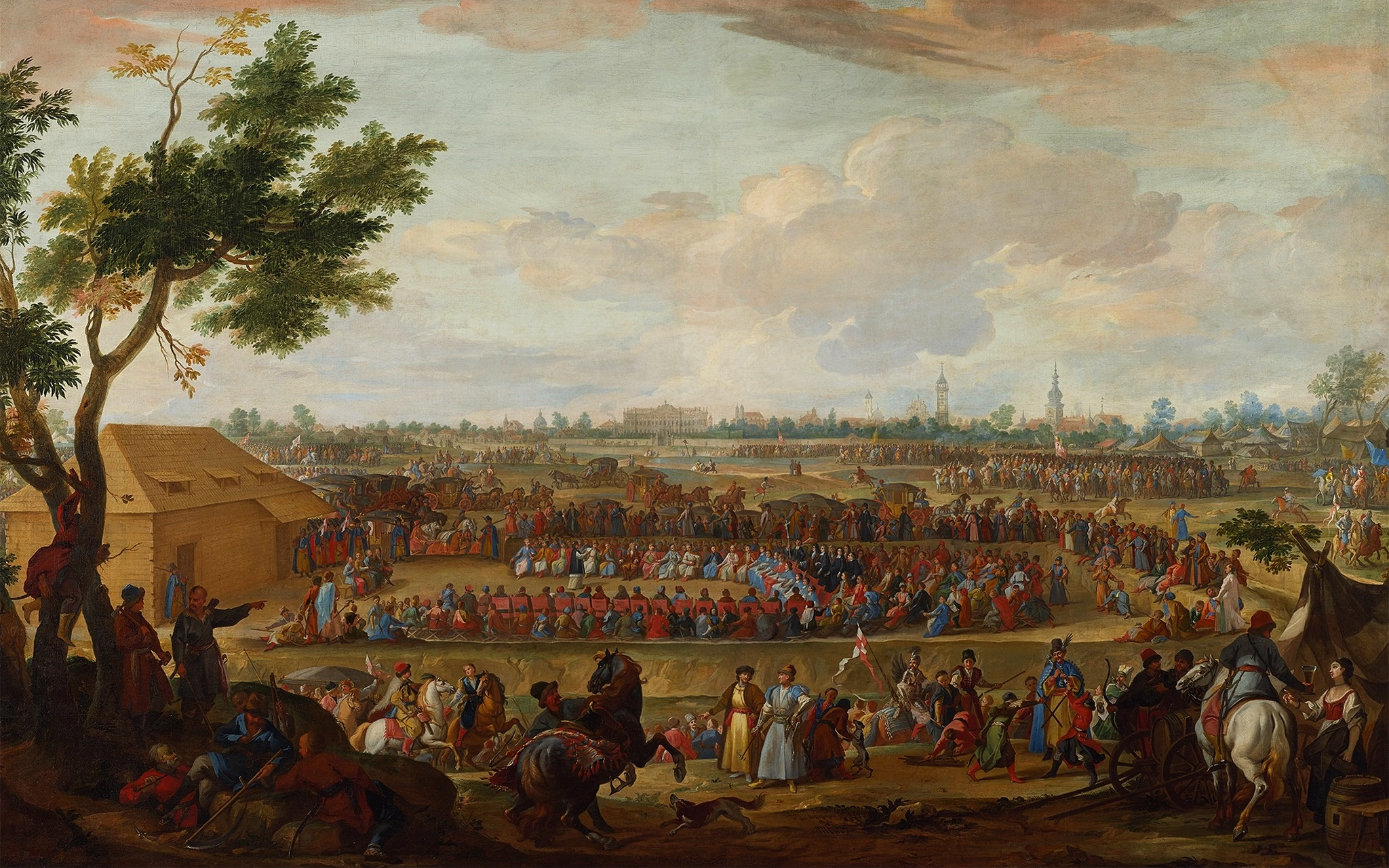
Election of Augustus II for King of Poland in Wola near Warsaw in 1697

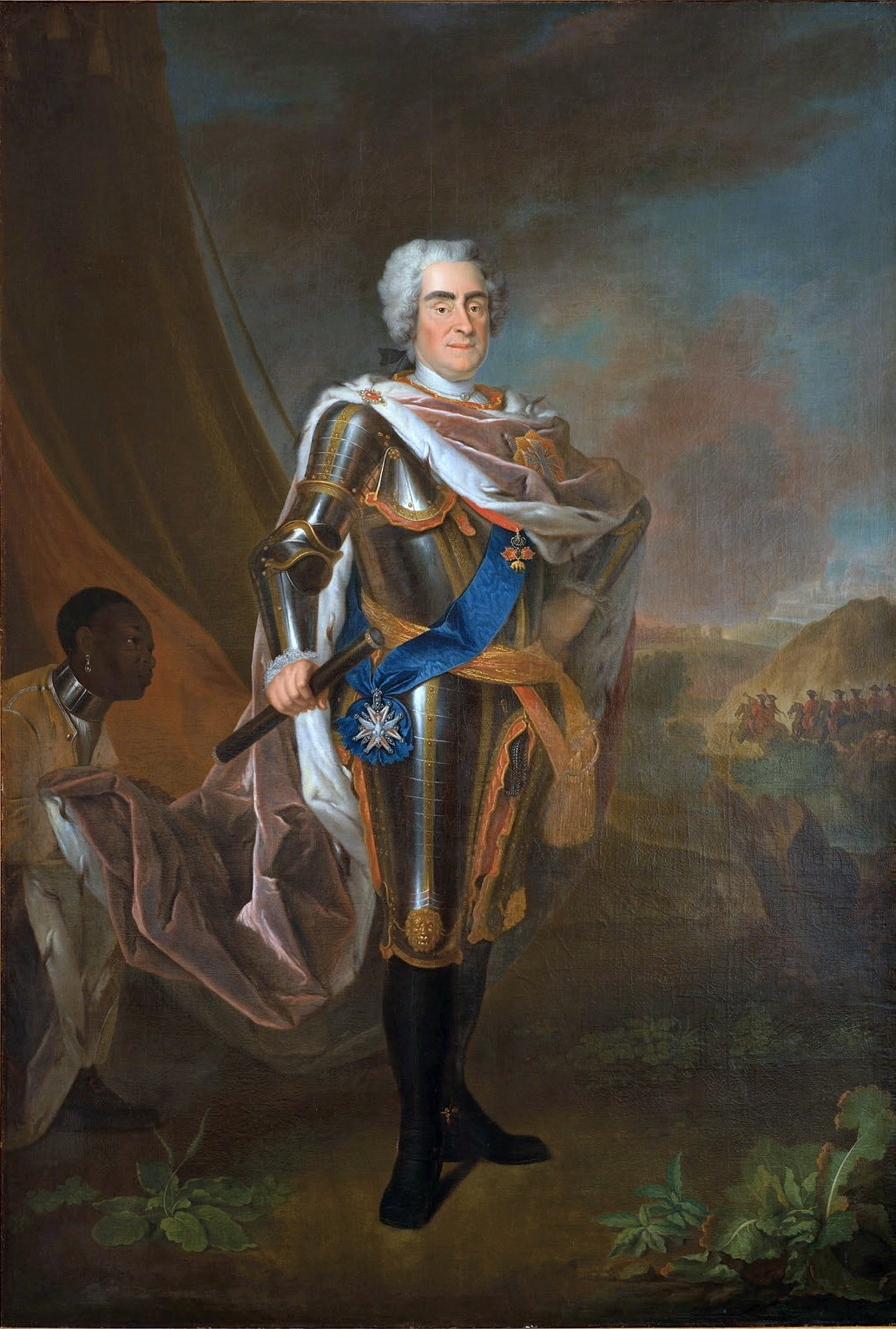
King Augustus II, by Louis de Silvestre

Following the death of Polish King John III Sobieski and having converted to Catholicism, Augustus won election as King of the Polish–Lithuanian Commonwealth in 1697 with the backing of Russia and Austria, which financed him through the banker Issachar Berend Lehmann. At the time, some questioned the legality of Augustus' elevation, since another candidate, François Louis, Prince of Conti, had received more votes. Each candidate, Conti and Augustus, was proclaimed as king by a different ecclesiastical authority: the Primate Michał Stefan Radziejowski proclaimed Conti and the bishop of Kujawy, Stanisław Dąmbski, proclaimed Augustus, with Jacob Heinrich von Flemming swearing to the pacta conventa as Augustus's proxy. However, Augustus hurried to the Commonwealth with a Saxon army, while Conti stayed in France for two months.

Although he had led the imperial troops against the Ottoman Empire in 1695 and 1696 without very much success, Augustus continued the war of the Holy League against Turkey, and during a campaign against the Ottomans, his Polish army defeated a Tatar expedition in the Battle of Podhajce in 1698. Unfortunately, on 22 September, a conflict between Polish and Saxon troops was narrowly avoided, causing the campaign to end. Victory at Podhajce had the political impact of forcing the Ottoman Empire to return Podolia and Kamieniec Podolski in Treaty of Karlowitz in 1699. An ambitious ruler, Augustus hoped to make the Polish throne hereditary within his family, and to use his resources as elector of Saxony to impose some order on the chaotic Polish–Lithuanian Commonwealth. He was, however, soon distracted from his internal reform projects by the possibility of external conquest. He formed an alliance with Frederick IV of Denmark and Peter I of Russia to strip the young King Charles XII of Sweden (Augustus' cousin) of his possessions. Poland's reward for participation in the Great Northern War was to have been Swedish Livonia. Charles proved an able military commander, however, quickly forcing the Danes out of the war and then driving back the Russians at Narva in 1700, thereby allowing him to focus on the struggle with Augustus. However, this war ultimately proved as disastrous for Sweden as for Poland.

Charles defeated Augustus' army at Riga in July 1701, forcing the Polish-Saxon army to withdraw from Livonia, and followed this up with an invasion of Poland. He captured Warsaw on 14 May 1702, defeated the Polish-Saxon army again at the Battle of Kliszów (July 1702), and took Kraków. He defeated another of Augustus' armies under the command of Generalfeldmarschall Adam Heinrich von Steinau at the Battle of Pułtusk in spring 1703, and besieged and captured Toruń.

By this time, Augustus was certainly ready for peace, but Charles felt that he would be more secure if he could establish someone with whom he had more influence on the Polish throne. In 1704, the Swedes installed Stanisław Leszczyński and tied the commonwealth to Sweden, which compelled Augustus to initiate military operations in Poland alongside Russia (an alliance was concluded in Narva in summer 1704). The resulting civil war in Poland (1704–1706) and the Grodno campaign (1705–1706) did not go well for Augustus. Following the Battle of Fraustadt, on 1 September 1706, Charles invaded Saxony, forcing Augustus to yield the Polish throne to Leszczyński by the Treaty of Altranstädt (October 1706).

Meanwhile, Russia's Tsar Peter had reformed his army, and he dealt a crippling defeat to the Swedes at the Battle of Poltava (1709). This spelt the end of the Swedish Empire and the rise of the Russian Empire.

== King of Poland for the second time ==
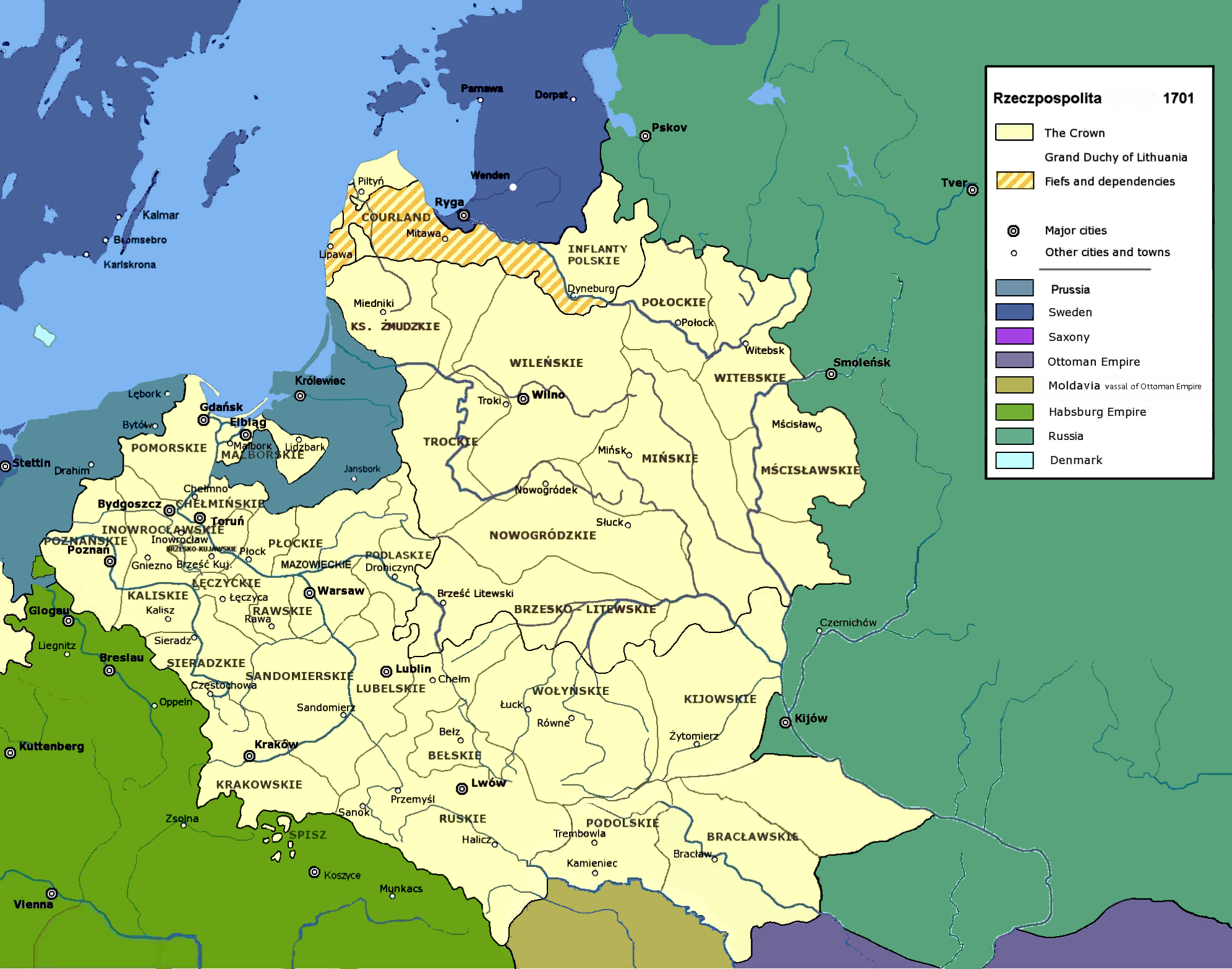
Polish–Lithuanian Commonwealth in 1701

The weakened Polish–Lithuanian Commonwealth soon came to be regarded as almost a protectorate of Russia. In 1709, Augustus II returned to the Polish throne under Russian auspices. Once again, he attempted to establish an absolute monarchy in the Polish–Lithuanian Commonwealth, but was faced with opposition from the nobility (szlachta, see Tarnogród Confederation). He was handicapped by the mutual jealousy of the Saxons and the Poles, and a struggle broke out in Poland which was only ended when the king promised to limit the number of his army in that country to 18,000 men. Peter the Great seized on the opportunity to pose as mediator, threatened the Commonwealth militarily, and in 1717 forced Augustus and the nobility to sign an accommodation favorable to Russian interests, at the Silent Sejm (Sejm Niemy).

For the remainder of his reign, in an uneasy relationship, Augustus was more or less dependent on Russia (and to a lesser extent, on Austria) to maintain his Polish throne. He gave up his dynastic ambitions and concentrated instead on attempts to strengthen the Commonwealth. Faced with both internal and foreign opposition, however, he achieved little. In 1729, he established the Grand Musketeers Company in Dresden, one of the oldest Polish officers' schools, which in 1730 was relocated to Warsaw.

Augustus died at Warsaw in 1733. Although he had failed to make the Polish throne hereditary in his house, his eldest son, Frederick Augustus II of Saxony, succeeded him to the Polish throne as Augustus III of Poland, although he had to be installed by the Imperial Russian Army during the War of the Polish Succession.

== Legacy ==
=== Augustus II and the arts ===
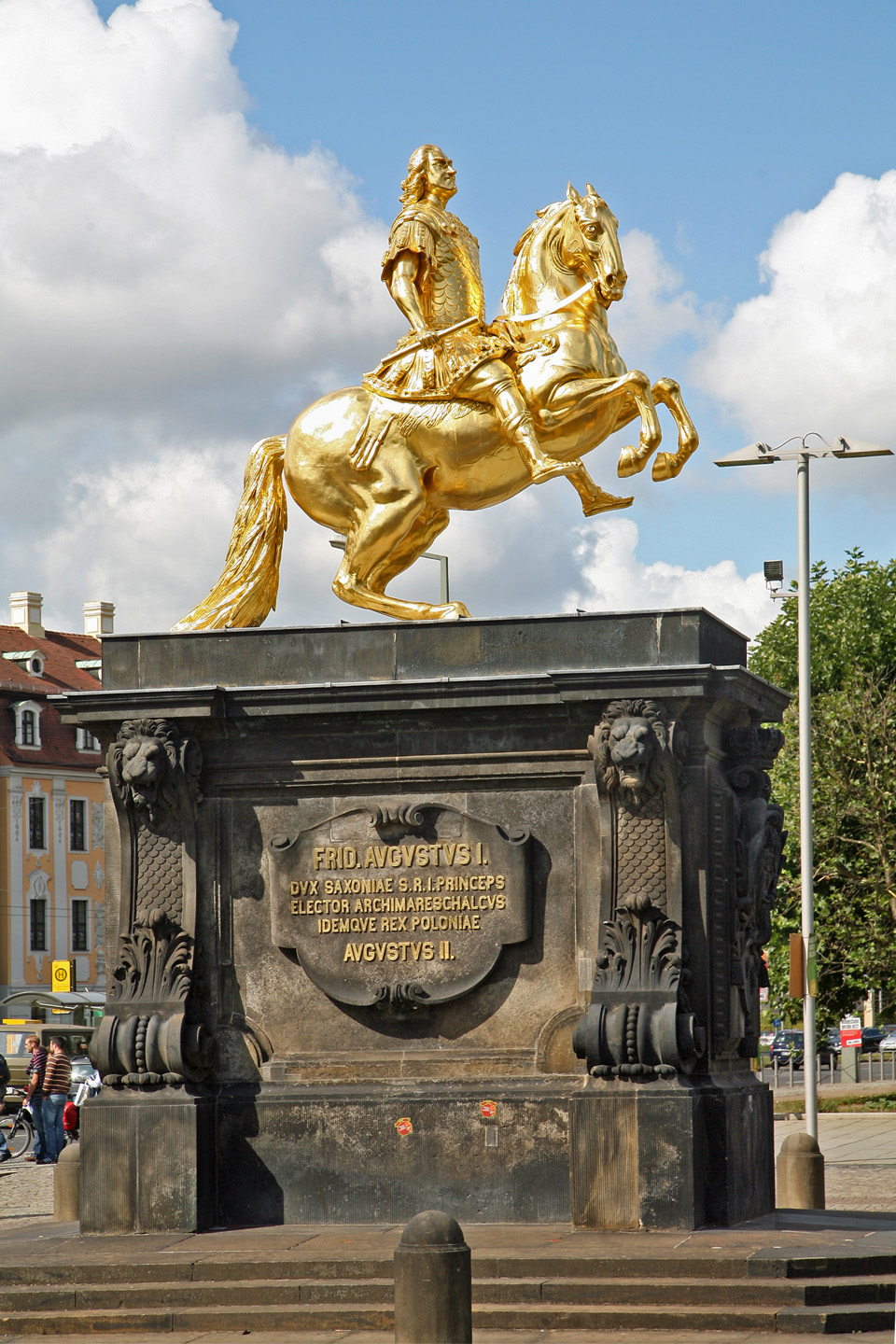
Equestrian statue of Augustus II the Strong in Dresden

Augustus is perhaps best remembered as a patron of the arts and architecture. He had beautiful palaces built in Dresden, a city that became renowned for extraordinary cultural brilliance. He introduced the first public museums, such as the Green Vault in 1723, and started a systematic collection of paintings that are now on display in the Gemäldegalerie Alte Meister.

From 1687 to 1689, Augustus toured France and Italy. The court in Versailles impressed him deeply. In accordance with the spirit of the baroque age, Augustus invested in the representative splendour of Dresden Castle, a major residence, to advertise his wealth and power.

With strict building regulations, major urban development plans, and a certain feeling for art, the king began to transform Dresden into a renowned cultural centre with one of Germany's finest art collections, though most of the city's famous sights and landmarks were completed during the reign of his son Augustus III. The most famous building started under Augustus II the Strong was the Zwinger. Also known are Pillnitz Castle, his summer residence, Moritzburg Castle and Hubertusburg Castle, his hunting lodges. He greatly expanded the Saxon Palace in Warsaw with the adjacent Saxon Garden, which became the city's oldest public park and one of the first publicly accessible parks in the world. Following the devastation of the Great Northern War, he also had the Royal Castle, Warsaw restored and enlarged. He also expanded the Wilanów Palace.

He granted composer Johann Adolph Hasse the title of the Royal-Polish and Electoral-Saxon Kapellmeister in 1731.

A man of pleasure, the king sponsored lavish court balls, Venetian-style balli in maschera, and luxurious court gatherings, games, and garden festivities. His court acquired a reputation for extravagance throughout Europe. He held a famous animal-tossing contest in Dresden at which 647 foxes, 533 hares, 34 badgers and 21 wildcats were tossed and killed. Augustus himself participated, reportedly demonstrating his strength by holding the end of his sling by just one finger, with two of the strongest men in his court on the other end.

From 1 to 26 June 1730, he held the Zeithain Encampment after reorganising and reequipping his army. The Prussian king Frederick William I was present, as well as 48 invited European princes with their military officers and envoys of the European powers. It was not only the largest troop show in Europe but also one of the most gigantic baroque festivals of its time, showcasing the high level of Saxon art and culture.

=== Gallery ===
Royal Monogram

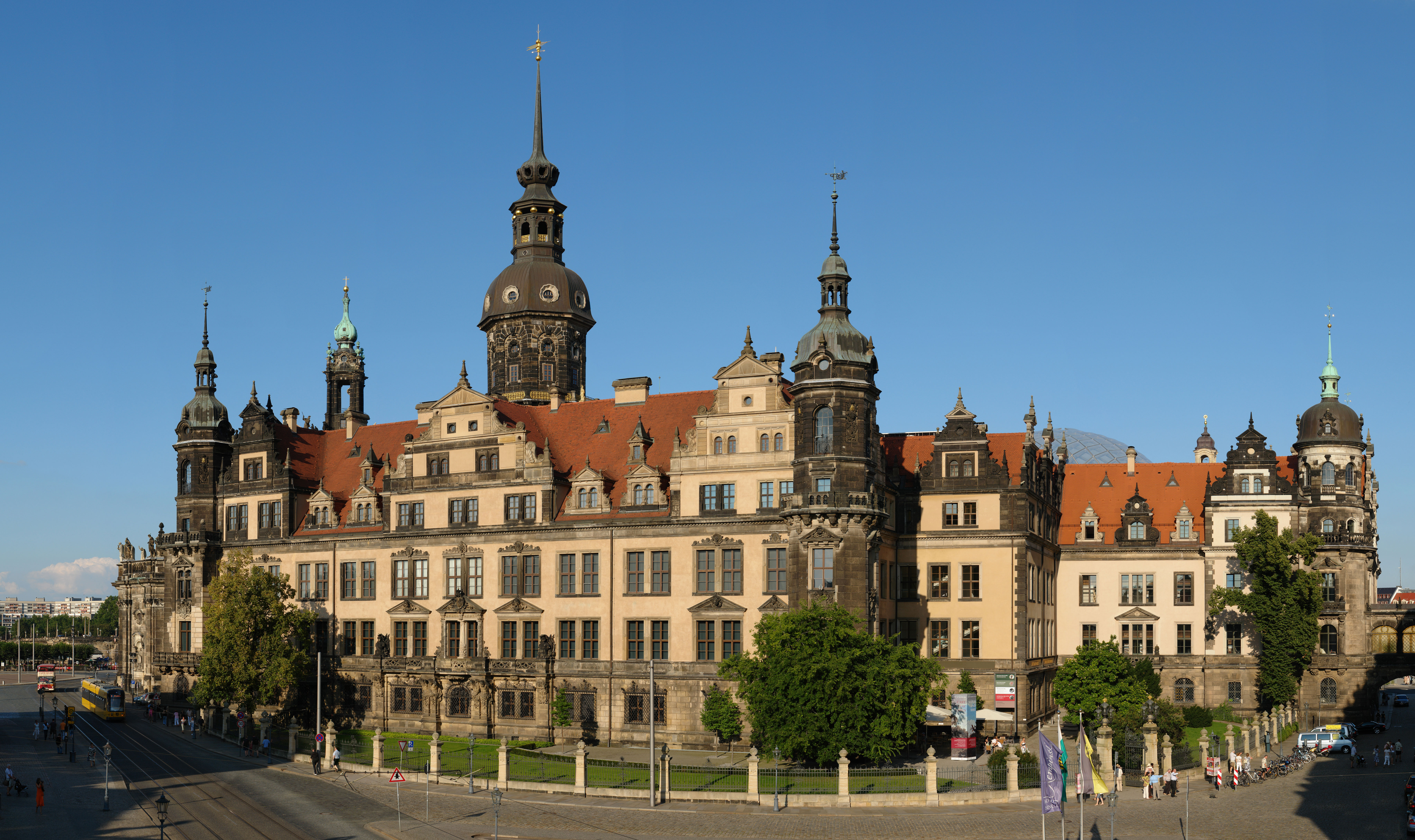
Dresden Castle

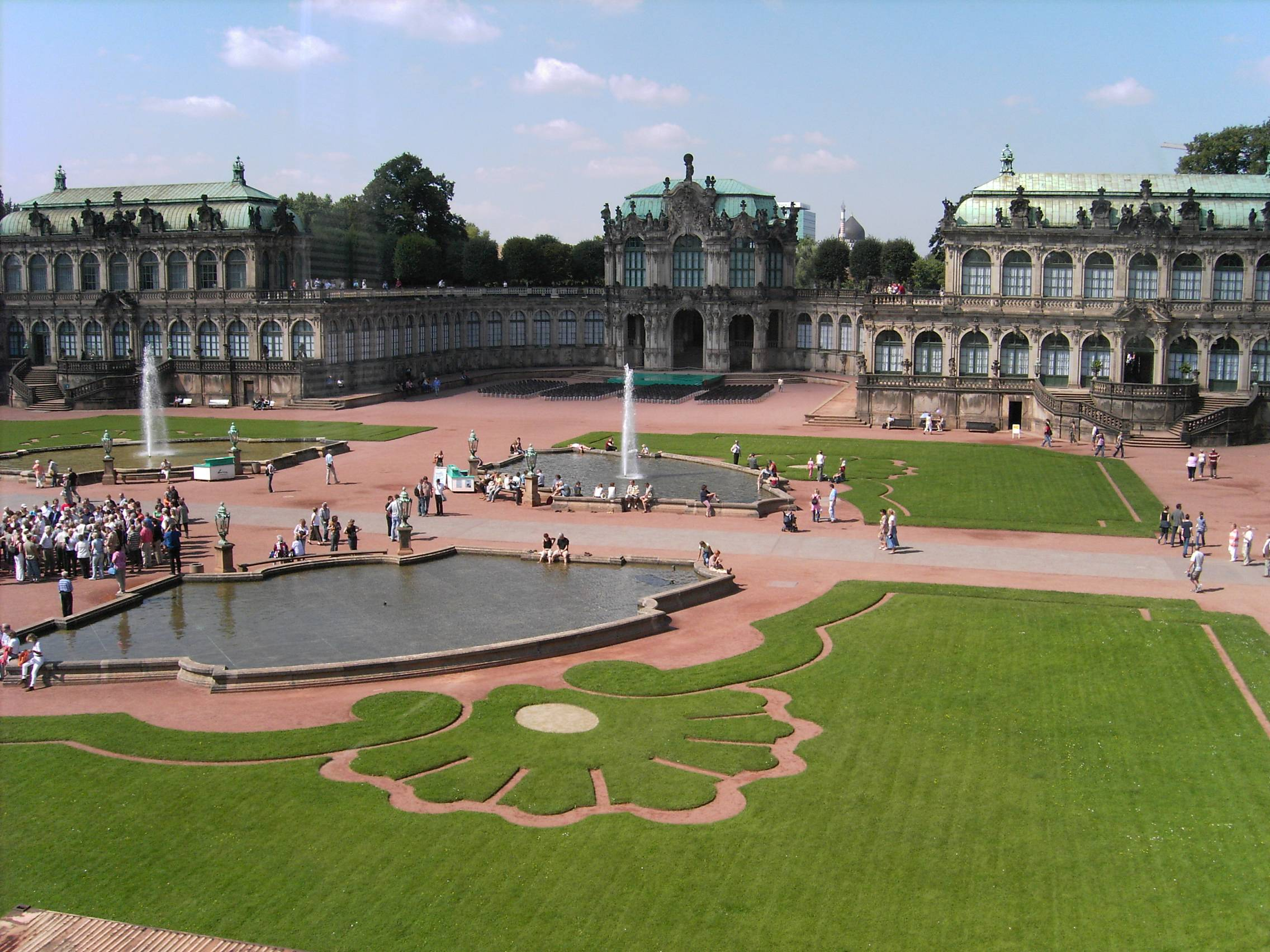
Zwinger, Dresden

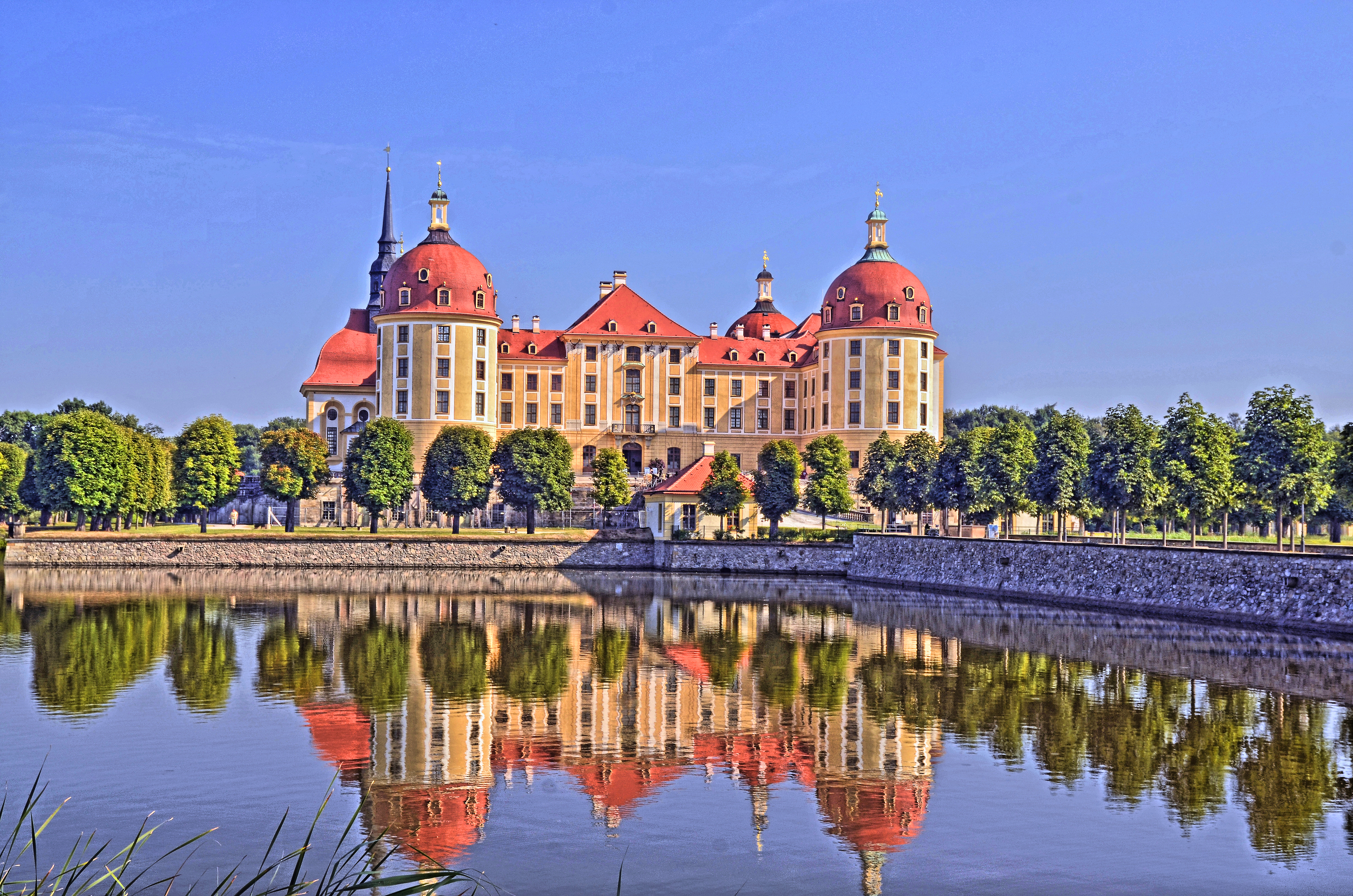
Moritzburg Castle

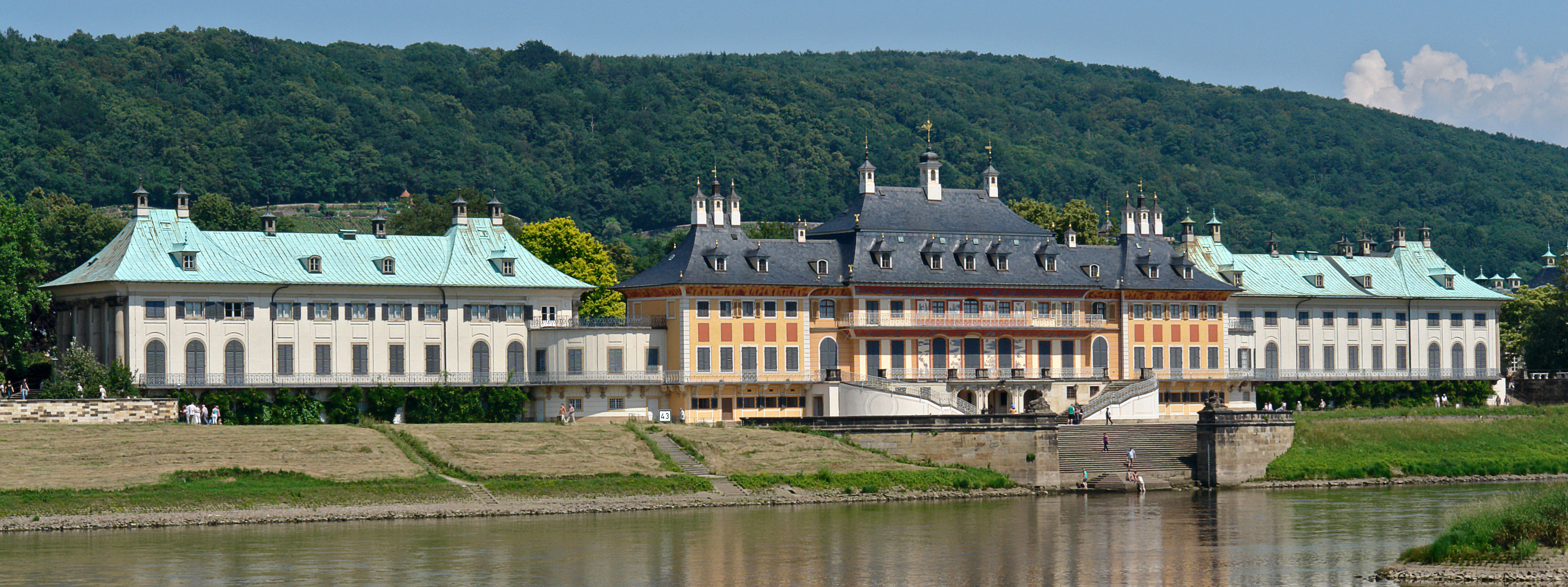
Pillnitz Castle

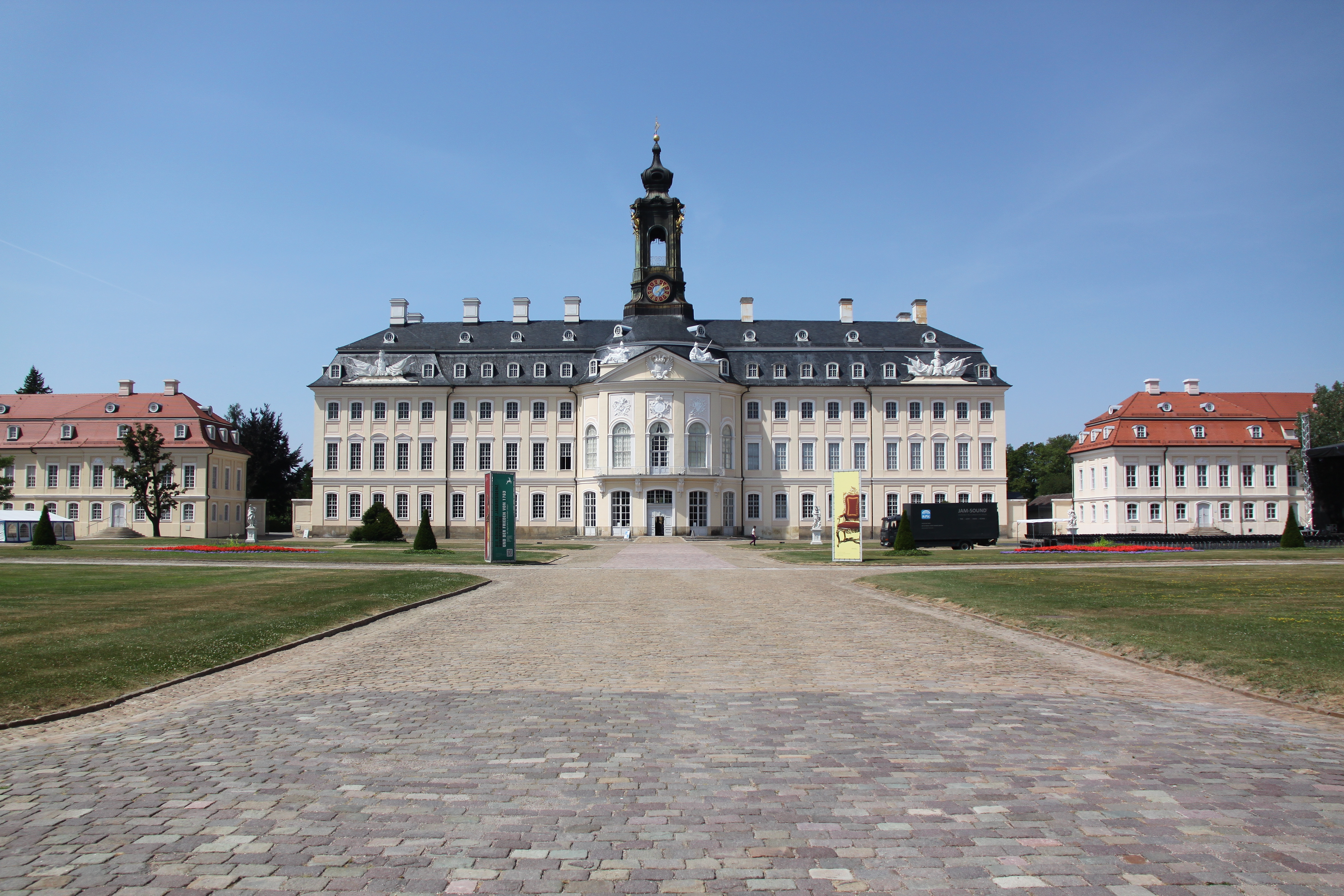
Hubertusburg Castle

=== Meissen porcelain ===
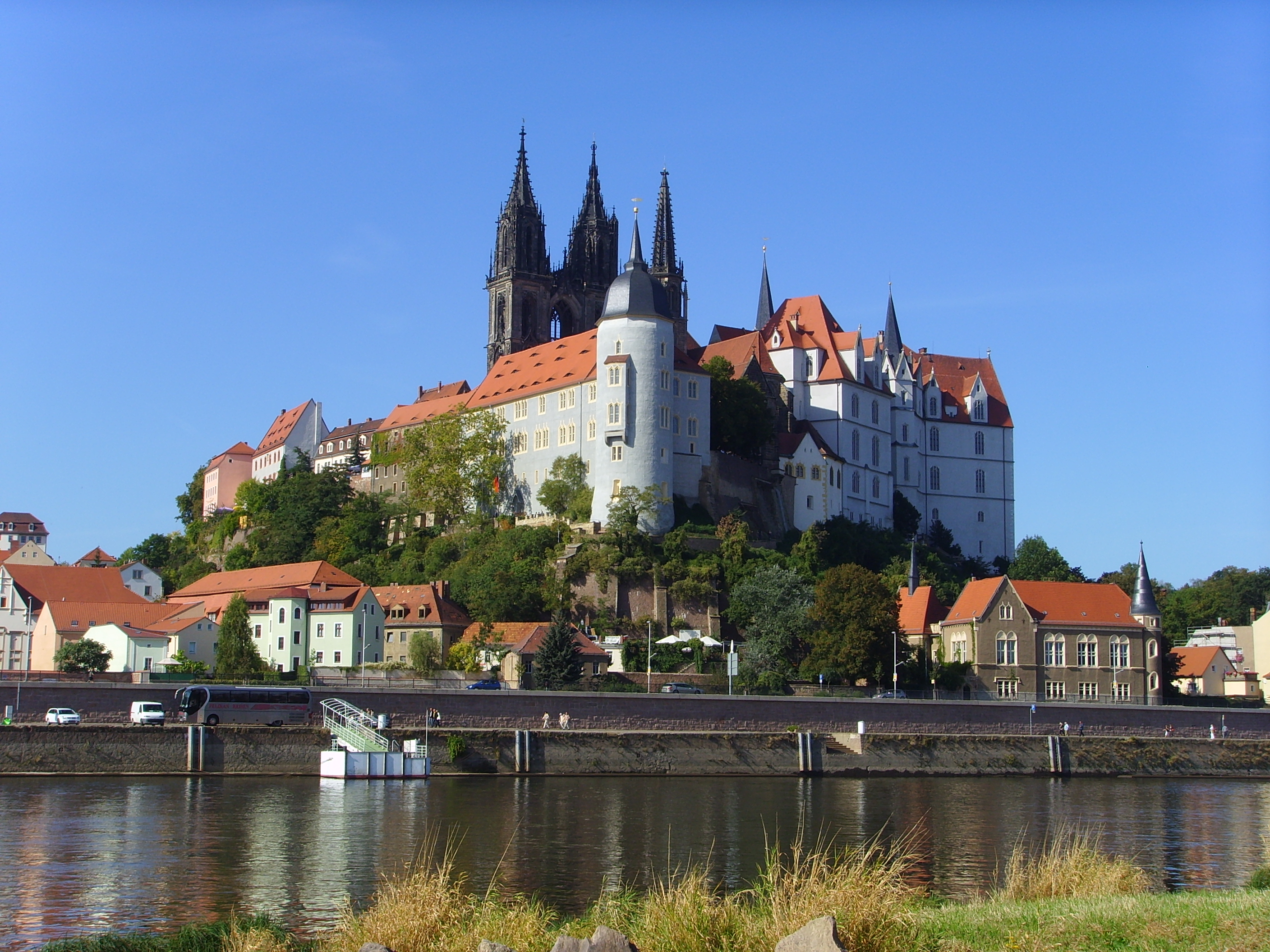
The Late Gothic Albrechtsburg castle in Meissen under Augustus II became the Royal-Polish and Electoral-Saxon Porcelain Manufacture.

Augustus II successfully sponsored efforts to discover the secret of manufacturing porcelain. In 1701, he rescued the young alchemist Johann Friedrich Böttger, who had fled from the court of King Frederick I of Prussia, who had expected that he would produce gold for him as he had boasted he could.

Augustus imprisoned Böttger and tried to force him to reveal the secret of manufacturing gold. Böttger's transition from alchemist to potter was orchestrated as an attempt to avoid the impossible demands of the king. Being an alchemist by profession rather than a potter gave Böttger an advantage. He realised that the current approaches, which involved mixing fine white substances like crushed egg shells into clay, would not work. Rather, his approach was to attempt to bake clay at higher temperatures than had ever before been attained in European kilns. That approach yielded the breakthrough that had eluded European potters for a century. By the king's decree, the Royal-Polish and Electoral-Saxon Porcelain Manufactory was established in Meissen in 1709. The manufacture of fine porcelain continues at the Meissen porcelain factory.

=== Order of the White Eagle ===
In November 1705 in Tykocin, Augustus founded the Order of the White Eagle, Poland's first and preeminent order of chivalry. In 1723, he bought the Großsedlitz estate near Dresden, and after expanding the palace and garden complex, in 1727 he organised there the first ever festivities of the Order of the White Eagle.

=== Other ===
Augustus II was called "the Strong" for his bear-like physical strength and for his numerous offspring (only one of them was his legitimate child and heir). The most famous of the king's children born out of wedlock was Maurice de Saxe, a brilliant strategist who attained the highest military ranks in the Kingdom of France. In the War of the Polish Succession, he remained loyal to his employer Louis XV, who was married to the daughter of Augustus's rival Stanisław Leszczyński. Augustus' granddaughter, Maria Josepha of Saxony, later became Dauphine of France through her marriage to the Dauphin Louis, and the mother of three Kings of France (Louis XVI, Louis XVIII and Charles X).

Augustus was 1.76 meters (5 ft 9 in) tall, above average height for that time, but despite his extraordinary physical strength, he did not look big. In his final years, he suffered from diabetes mellitus and became obese, at his death weighing some 110 kilograms (240 lb). Augustus II's body was interred in the Wawel Cathedral in Kraków — all but his heart, which rests at the Dresden Cathedral.

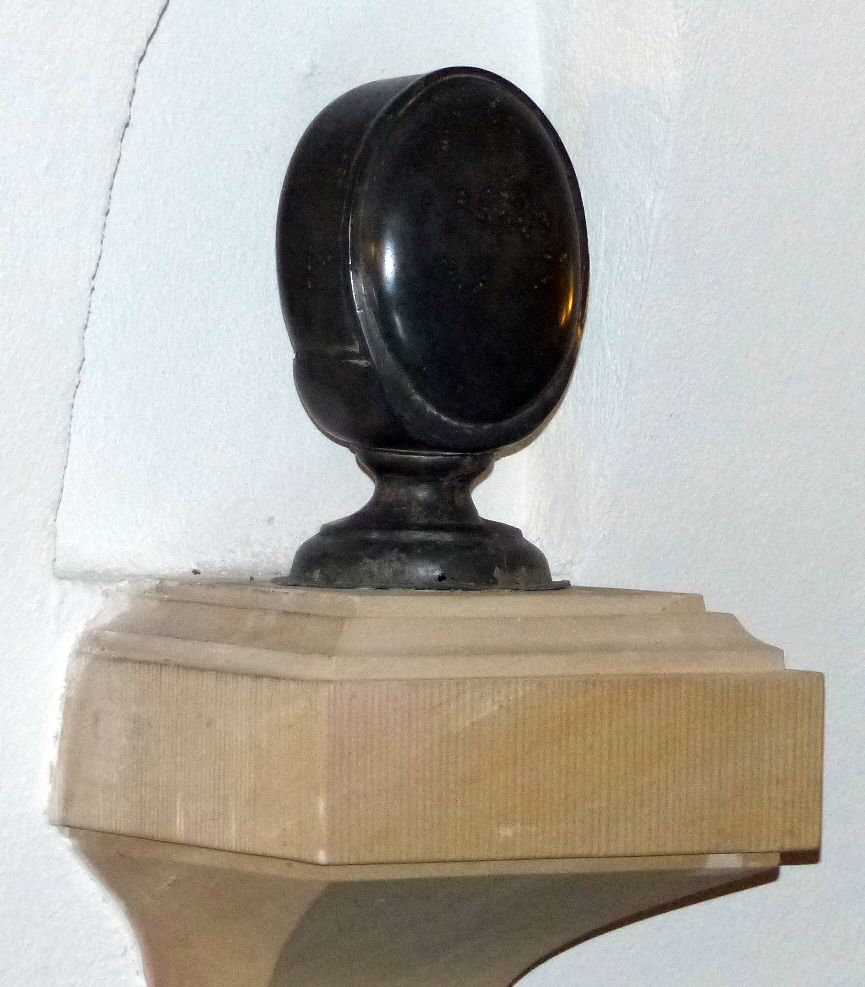
Capsule containing the heart of Augustus II in the Dresden Cathedral.

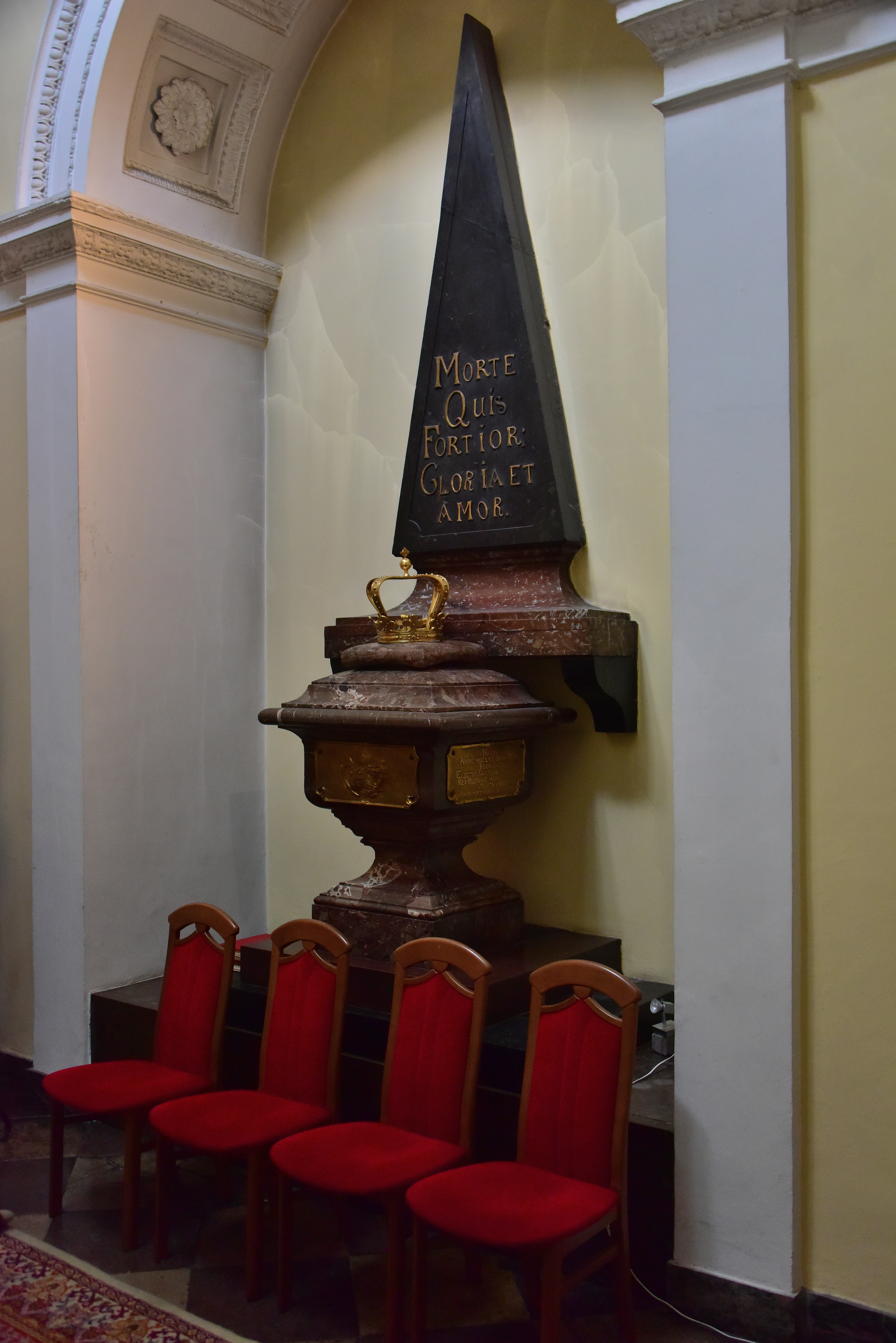
Urn containing the viscera of Augustus II in the Church of the Transfiguration, Warsaw.

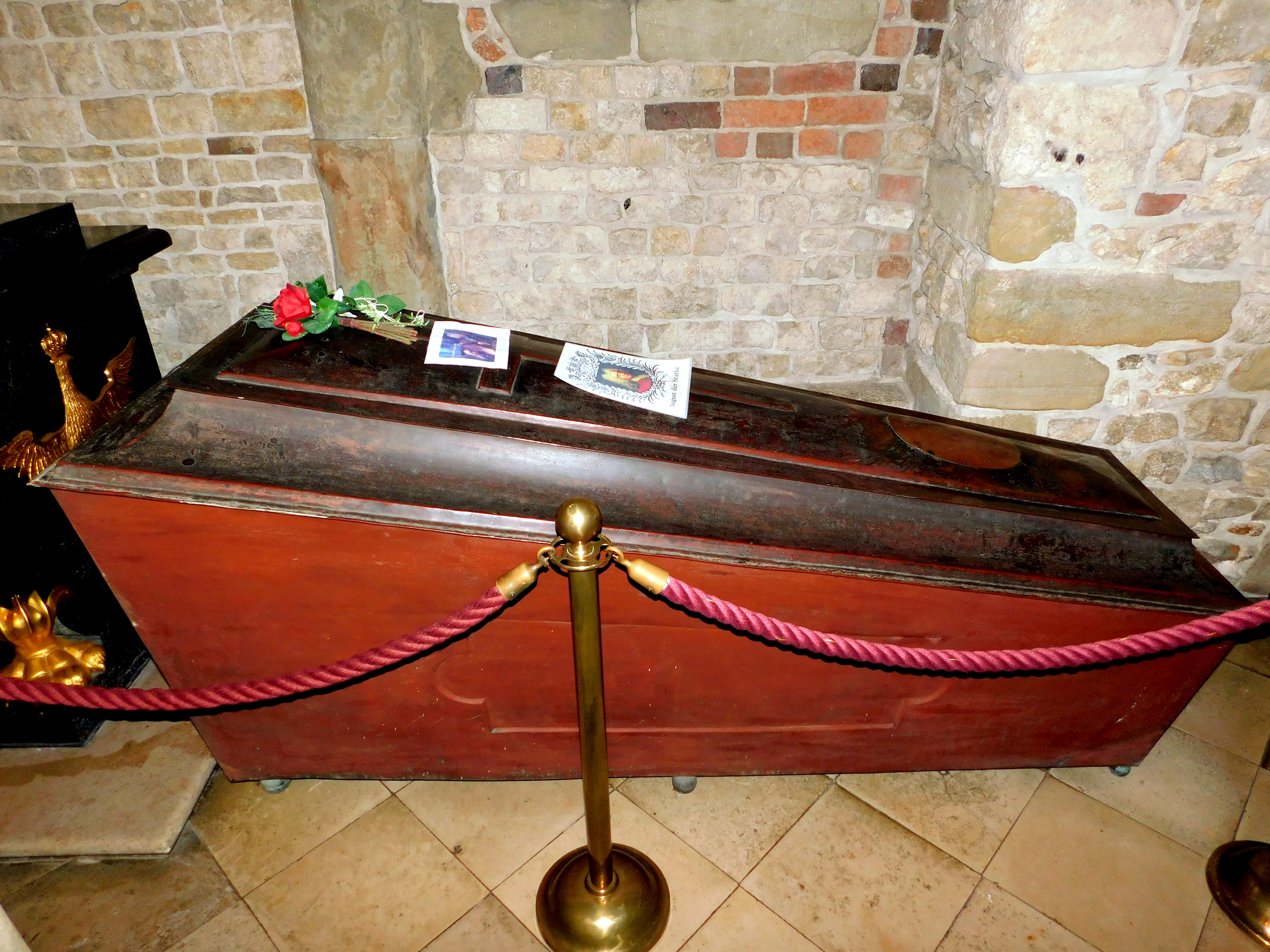
Sarcophagus of Augustus II in Wawel Cathedral, temporarily placed in the St. Leonard's Crypt.

== In media ==
=== Film ===
In 1936, Augustus was the subject of a Polish-German film Augustus the Strong directed by Paul Wegener. Augustus was portrayed by the actor Michael Bohnen.

=== TV series ===
In 2010, Augustus was featured in the ZDF documentary Die Deutschen season 2, episode 6 August der Starke und die Liebe (Augustus the Strong and Love).

== Illegitimate issue ==
The Electress Christiane, who remained Protestant and refused to move to Poland with her husband, preferred to spend her time in the mansion in Pretzsch on the Elbe, in Saxony, where she died. Their marriage produced the only legitimate son (and successor) of Augustus: Frederick Augustus II, Elector of Saxony and King of Poland (1696–1763).

Augustus II, a voracious womanizer, spent most of his time with a series of mistresses:

- 1694–1696 with Countess Maria Aurora von Königsmarck;
- 1696–1699 with Countess Anna Aloysia Maximiliane von Lamberg;
- 1698–1704 with Ursula Katharina of Altenbockum, later Princess of Teschen;
- 1701–1706 with Maria Aurora von Spiegel, later married von Spiegel, a woman of Turkish origin captured as a toddler named Fatima at the Siege of Buda (1686) and brought up in Sweden as the goddaughter of Maria Aurora von Königsmarck;
- 1704–1713 with Anna Constantia von Brockdorff, later Countess of Cosel;
- 1706–1707 with Henriette Rénard;
- 1708 with Angélique Debargues, French ballerina and actress;
- 1713–1719 with Maria Magdalena of Bielinski, by her first marriage Countess of Dönhoff and by the second Princess Lubomirska;
- 1720–1721 with Erdmuthe Sophie of Dieskau, by marriage of Loß;
- 1721–1722 with Baroness Kristiane of Osterhausen, by marriage of Stanisławski.

Some contemporary sources, including Wilhelmine of Bayreuth, claimed that Augustus had as many as 365 or 382 children. The number cannot be verified and most likely is greatly exaggerated. The number might not refer to the king's children but to the nights that he spent with his mistresses. Augustus officially recognised only a tiny fraction of that number as his bastards (the mothers of these "chosen ones", with the possible exception of Fatima and Henriette Rénard, were all aristocratic ladies) and it is quite possible that the actual number was not much higher:

=== With Maria Aurora von Königsmarck ===
1. Maurice de Saxe (28 October 1696, Goslar – 30 November 1750, Château de Chambord), Count of Saxony.

=== With Ursula Katharina of Altenbockum ===
1. Johann Georg (21 August 1704 – 25 February 1774), Chevalier de Saxe, later Governor of Dresden.

=== With Maria Aurora von Spiegel (originally Fatima) ===
1. Frederick Augustus (19 June 1702, Warsaw/Dresden [?] – 16 March 1764, Pillnitz), Count Rutowsky;
2. Maria Anna Katharina Rutowska (1706–1746), Countess Rutowska; married firstly in January 1728 to Michał, Count Bieliński, divorced in early 1732; secondly, in February 1732, to Claude Marie Noyel, Comte du Bellegarde et d'Entremont.

=== With Anna Constantia von Brockdorff ===
1. Augusta Anna Constantia (24 February 1708 – 3 February 1728), Countess of Cosel; married on 3 June 1725 to Heinrich Friedrich, Count of Friesen;
2. Fredericka Alexandrine (27 October 1709 – 16 December 1784), Countess of Cosel; married on 18 February 1730 to Jan Kanty, Count Moszyński;
3. Frederick Augustus (27 August 1712 – 15 October 1770), Count of Cosel; married on 1 June 1749 to Countess Friederike Christiane of Holtzendorff. They had four children. The two sons, Gustav Ernst and Segismund, died unmarried. One of the two daughters, Constantia Alexandrina, married Johann Heinrich, Lehnsgraf Knuth. The other, named Charlotte, first married Count Rudolf of Bünau and then married Charles de Riviere.

=== With Henriette Rénard ===
1. Anna Orzelska (26 November 1707 – 27 September 1769, Avignon), Countess Orzelska; married on 10 August 1730 to Karl Ludwig Frederick of Schleswig-Holstein-Sonderburg-Beck. They divorced in 1733.

== Royal titles ==
- In Latin: Augustus Secundus, Dei Gratia rex Poloniae, magnus dux Lithuaniae, Russie, Prussiae, Masoviae, Samogitiae, Livoniae, Kijoviae, Volhyniae, Podoliae, Podlachiae, Smolensciae, Severiae, Czerniechoviaeque, necnon haereditarius dux Saxoniae et princeps elector etc.
- English translation: Augustus II, by the grace of God, King of Poland, Grand Duke of Lithuania, Ruthenia, Prussia, Masovia, Samogitia, Livonia, Kiev, Volhynia, Podolia, Podlachia, Smolensk, Severia and Chernihiv, and Hereditary Duke and Elector of Saxony, etc.

== Ancestry ==
Ancestors of Augustus II the Strong

8. John George I, Elector of Saxony; (1585–1656)
4. John George II, Elector of Saxony; (1613–1680)
9. Magdalene Sibylle of Prussia; (1586–1659)
2. John George III, Elector of Saxony; (1647–1691)
10. Christian, Margrave of Brandenburg-Bayreuth; (1581–1655)
5. Magdalene Sibylle of Brandenburg-Bayreuth; (1612–1687)
11. Marie, Margravine of Brandenburg-Bayreuth; (1579–1649)
1. Augustus II the Strong
12. King Christian IV of Denmark–Norway; (1577–1648)
6. King Frederik III of Denmark–Norway; (1609–1670)
13. Anne Catherine of Brandenburg; (1575–1612)
3. Princess Anna Sophie of Denmark; (1647–1717)
14. George, Duke of Brunswick-Lüneburg; (1582–1641)
7. Sophie Amalie of Brunswick-Lüneburg; (1628–1685)
15. Anne Eleonore of Hesse-Darmstadt; (1601–1659)

== Portraits by ==
- Rosalba Carriera
- Louis de Silvestre

== See also ==
- History of Saxony
- History of Poland (1569–1795)
- Rulers of Saxony
- List of Lithuanian rulers
- Dresden Castle – Residence of Augustus II the Strong

== Bibliography ==
- Groß, Reiner (2007). Die Wettiner. Stuttgart: Kohlhammer Verlag.
- Whaley, Joachim (2012). Germany and the Holy Roman Empire, II: From the Peace of Westphalia to the Dissolution of the Reich 1648–1806. Vol. 2. New York: Oxford University Press.
- Wilson, Peter H. (2016). Heart of Europe: A History of the Holy Roman Empire. Cambridge: Harvard University Press.

Augustus II of Poland (Frederick Augustus I of Saxony) House of Wettin Born: 12 May 1670 Died: 1 February 1733
Regnal titles
Vacant Title last held by John III Sobieski	King of Poland; Grand Duke of Lithuania; 1697 – 1706	Succeeded by Stanisław Leszczyński
Preceded by Stanisław Leszczyński	King of Poland; Grand Duke of Lithuania; 1709 – 1733	Succeeded by Stanisław Leszczyński
Preceded by John George IV	Elector of Saxony; 1694 – 1733	Succeeded by Frederick Augustus II
