= List of British Turks =

The following is a list of British Turks, including people of full or partial ethnic Turkish origin with British citizenship.

The majority of notable British Turks come from the large Turkish Cypriot community, followed by ethnic Turks who originate from Turkey. In addition, there are notable British Turks who descend from other post-Ottoman modern nation-states which still have significant ethnic Turkish minorities. For example, from the Balkans, Silvena Rowe has a paternal Turkish Bulgarian background Moustafa Palazli has a Turkish Western Thracian background from Greece. From North Africa, Kasim Kutay has a paternal Turkish Egyptian background. Meanwhile, Egyptian-born Dodi Fayed was maternally of Turkish Saudi origin. From the Levant, Farah Zeynep Abdullah, Nemir Kirdar and Rena Kirdar have a Turkish Iraqi background; Rana Kabbani has a Turkish Syrian background; and Skandar Keynes and Soumaya Keynes have a maternal Turkish Lebanese background.

In addition, there are notable naturalised British citizens of Turkish origin who descend from the modern Turkish diaspora (i.e. from countries which were never part of the former Ottoman Empire). The majority are "Euro-Turks" who descend from Western Europe (e.g. Elif Shafak have a Turkish French background; Atif Bashir and Semra Eren-Nijhar have a Turkish German background). Some British Turks have also come from the diaspora in North America (e.g. Erdem Moralıoğlu has a Turkish Canadian background).

Many notable British Turks have dual nationality, including British nationality and the country which they descend from (e.g. Cypriot, TRNC, Turkish, Bulgarian, Iraqi, etc.). Some British Turks have also moved to other parts of the modern Turkish diaspora where they have acquired another citizenship. This is most notable among the British-Turkish Cypriot diaspora; for example, in addition to their British citizenship, Hal Ozsan also has American citizenship; Mutlu Çerkez also has Australian citizenship; and Alkan Chaglar and ice hockey player Erol Kahraman both also have Canadian citizenship.

== Academia ==
- Mete Atatüre (born 1975), Professor of Physics at University of Cambridge
- Süleyman Başak (born c. 1964), Professor of Finance at the London Business School (Turkish Cypriot origin)
- Mehmet Ismet Başaran (born August 1953), chemical engineer and philatelist
- Müge Çevik, clinical lecturer in Infectious Diseases and Medical Virology at the University of St Andrews
- Mustafa Djamgoz (born 1952), Professor of Cancer Biology at Imperial College London and Chairman of the College of Medicine’s Science Council (Turkish Cypriot origin)
- Semra Eren-Nijhar (born 1967), sociologist (Turkish German origin)
- Zakaria Erzinçlioğlu (1951–2002), forensic entomologist (Turkish Hungarian origin)
- Ten Feizi, FMedSci FRS (born in 1937), Professor and Director of the Glycosciences Laboratory at Imperial College London (Turkish Cypriot origin)
- Velia Abdel-Huda (1916–2012), art historian and socialite; the first Muslim woman to study at the University of Oxford
- Firat Güder, bioengineer, scientist, innovator and Professor of Intelligent Interfaces at Imperial College London
- Yaprak Gürsoy (born 1978), Professor of European Politics and the Chair of Contemporary Turkish Studies at the London School of Economics
- Rana Kabbani (born 1958), cultural historian, writer and broadcaster (Turkish Syrian origin)
- Deniz Kandiyoti (born 1944), Emeritus Professor of Development Studies at the SOAS University of London
- Peter Levi (1931–2000), poet, archaeologist, Jesuit priest, travel writer, biographer, academic and ccritic; Professor of Poetry at the University of Oxford (1984–1989)
- Ziya Meral, lecturer in International Studies and Diplomacy at the SOAS University of London
- Frederick Akbar Mahomed (1849–1884), British physician
- Gulnur Muradoglu (born 1961), Professor of Behavioural Finance at Queen Mary University of London
- Mustafa F. Özbilgin (born 1970), Professor of Human Resource Management at Brunel University
- Esra Özyürek Professor of Abrahamic Religions and Shared Values at the Faculty of Divinity, University of Cambridge
- Zehra Sayers (born 1953), structural biologist
- Simon Schama (born 1945), historian and television presenter; Professor of History and Art History at Columbia University
- Mete Sozen (1930–2018), developed the first earthquake shaking simulators
- Ibrahim Sirkeci (born 1972), Director of International Business School, Manchester, United Kingdom
- Ayşe Zarakol (born 1977), Professor of International Relations at the University of Cambridge
- Erkan Oterkus (born 1979), Turkish-British mechanical engineer

== Arts and literature ==
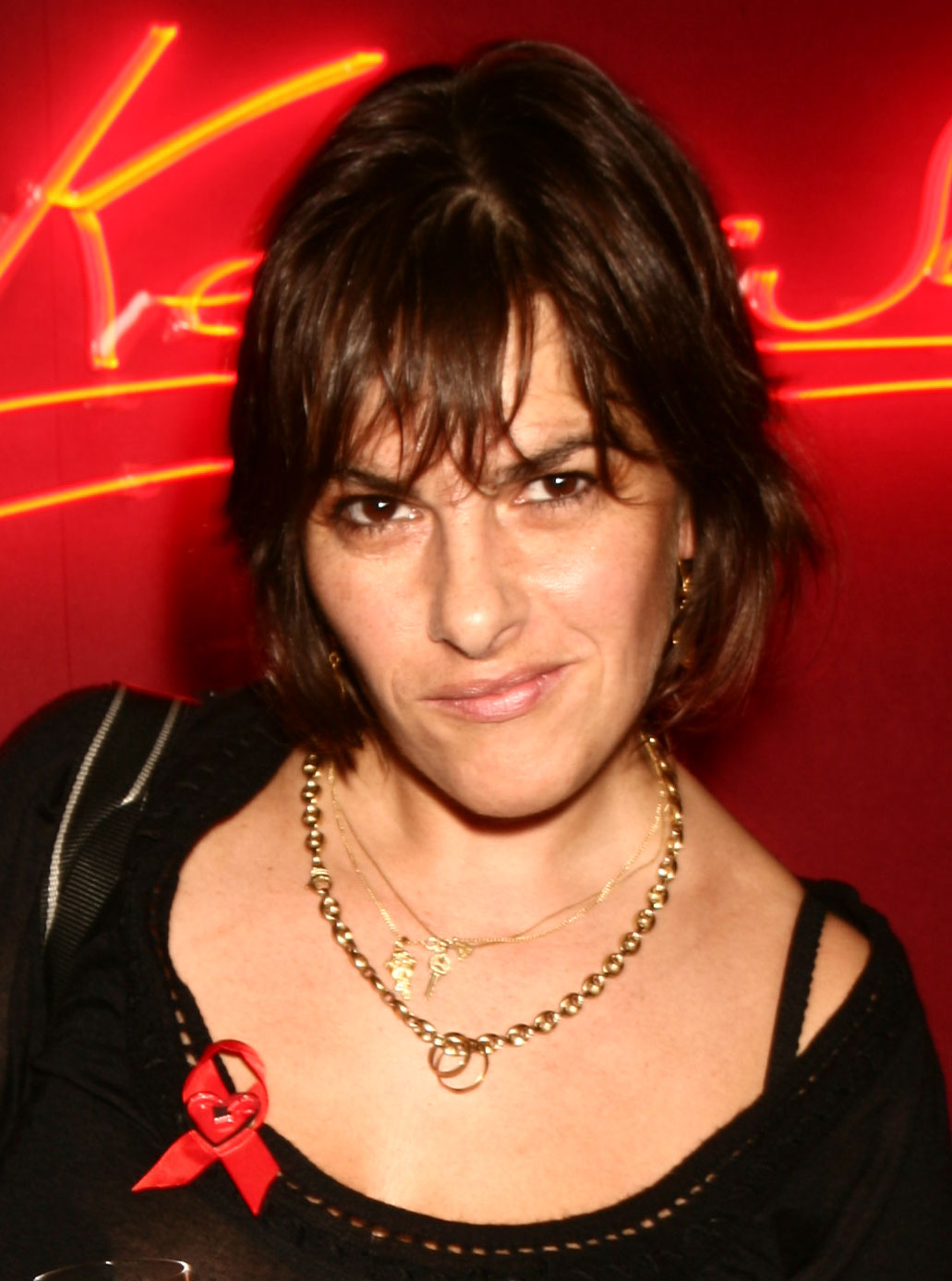
Tracey Emin

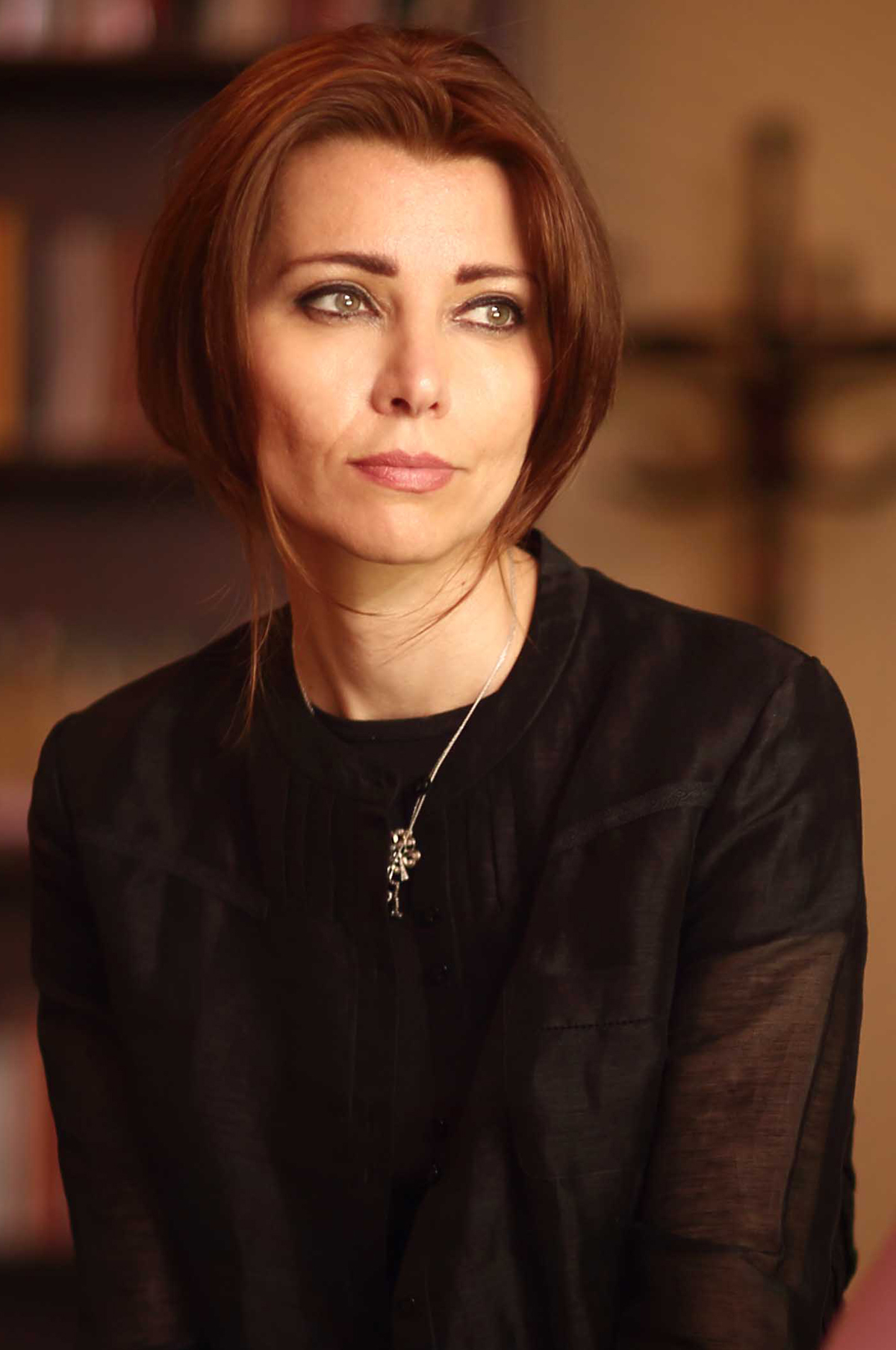
Elif Shafak

- Memo Akten (born 1975), artist
- Kutluğ Ataman (born 1961), artist and film director
- Ali Kemal Bey (1867–1922), Ottoman journalist; Minister of the Interior of the Ottoman Empire
- Alkan Chaglar (born 1981), journalist (Turkish Cypriot origin)
- Mutlu Çerkez (1964–2005), artist (Turkish Cypriot origin)
- Tice Cin (1995), writer, editor and multidisciplinary artist
- Tracey Emin (born 1963), artist (Turkish Cypriot father)
- Mehmet Ergen, theatre director and founder of Arcola Theatre
- Moris Farhi (1935–2019), Turkish author; vice-president of International PEN (2001-2019)
- Fiore de Henriquez (1921–2004), Italian-born sculptor (Turkish and Russian mother; Spanish father; naturalised British citizen)
- Mustafa Hulusi (born in 1971), artist (Turkish Cypriot origin)
- Ümit Hussein, literary translator and interpreter (Turkish Cypriot origin)
- Yaşar İsmailoğlu (born 1945), poet (Turkish Cypriot origin)
- Rachel Johnson (1965), journalist, television presenter, and author (Turkish great-grandfather)
- Fatoş Üstek (born 1980), is a London-based independent Turkish curator and writer
- Bengi Unsal, director of Institute of Contemporary Arts
- Soumaya Keynes (born 1989), trade and globalization editor at The Economist magazine (Turkish Lebanese mother)
- Rena Kirdar (born 1969), writer (Turkish Iraqi origin)
- Ela Lee (born 1995), author and former lawyer
- Arif Ozakca (born 1979), artist (Turkish Cypriot origin)
- Elif Shafak (born 1971), novelist (Turkish French origin; naturalised British citizen)
- Diana Souhami (born 1940), biographer
- Ceylan Yeğinsu (born 1986), journalist and currently a staff reporter for The New York Times
- Robert Paul Weston (born 1975), children's author (British-Turkish father)

== Business ==
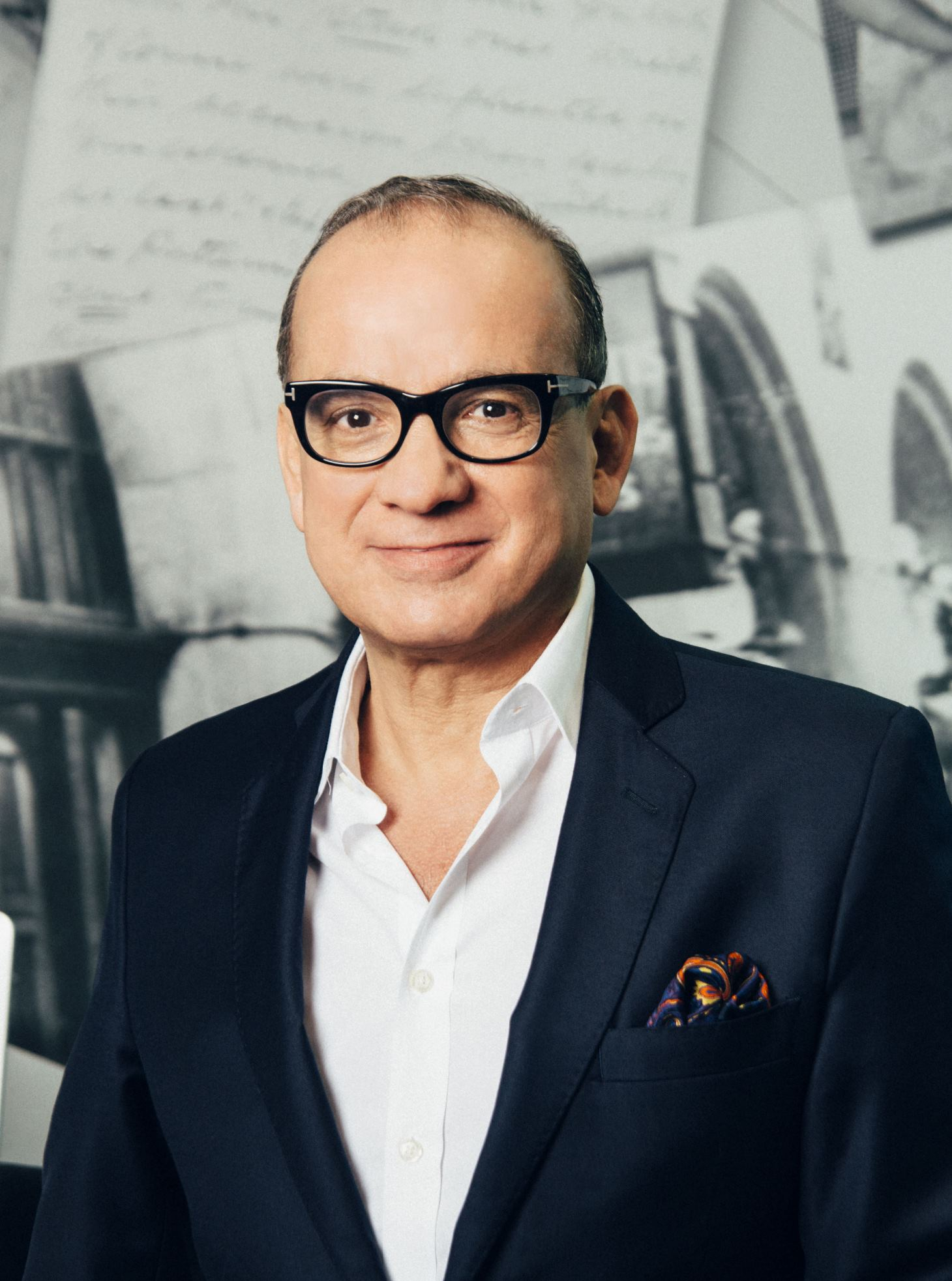
Touker Suleyman

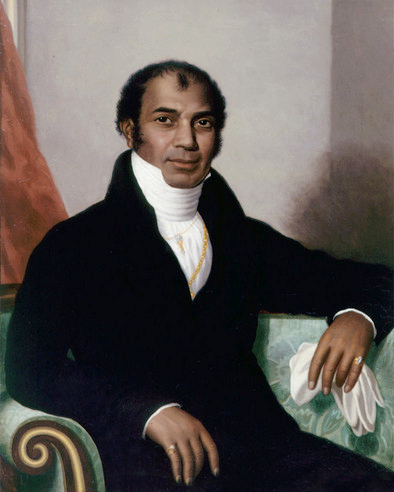
Dean Mahomed

- Efe Cakarel, entrepreneur, founder and CEO of MUBI
- Halit Cıngıllıoglu (born 1954), industrialist
- Mehmet Dalman (1958), investment banker and chairman of Welsh football club Cardiff City (Turkish Cypriot origin)
- Mev Dinc (born May 1957), video game designer
- Tufan Erginbilgiç, CEO of Rolls-Royce Holdings
- Ali Guryel, founder of Bromcom (Turkish Cypriot origin)
- Hattie Hasan, MBE, CEO of the Stopcocks Women Plumbers (Turkish Cypriot parents)
- Aga Khan V (born 1971), 50th Imam of the Nizari Isma'ilis; chairman of the Aga Khan Development Network
- Nemir Kirdar (1936–2020), billionaire; founder of Investcorp (Turkish-Iraqi origin)
- Kasim Kutay (born 1965), CEO of Novo Holdings A/S (Turkish Egyptian father)
- Ömer Koç (born 1962), Turkish businessman and he lives in London
- Dean Mahomed (1759–1851), raveller, soldier, surgeon, entrepreneur (Arab and Afshar Turk origin)
- Khaled Mardam-Bey, software developer and creator of mIRC (Turkish Syrian origin)
- Asil Nadir (1941–2025), businessman (Turkish Cypriot origin)
- Shaha Riza (born 1953), World Bank staffer (Turkish Libyan father)
- Touker Suleyman (born 1953), fashion retail entrepreneur and a "dragon" on Dragon's Den (Turkish Cypriot origin)
- Erkut Sogut (born 1980), sports agent
- Lev Tanju, founder of Palace Skateboards (Turkish father)
- Selcuk Yorgancioglu (born 1967), Turkish-British financier

== Cinema and television ==
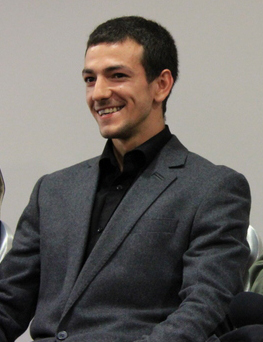
Josef Altin

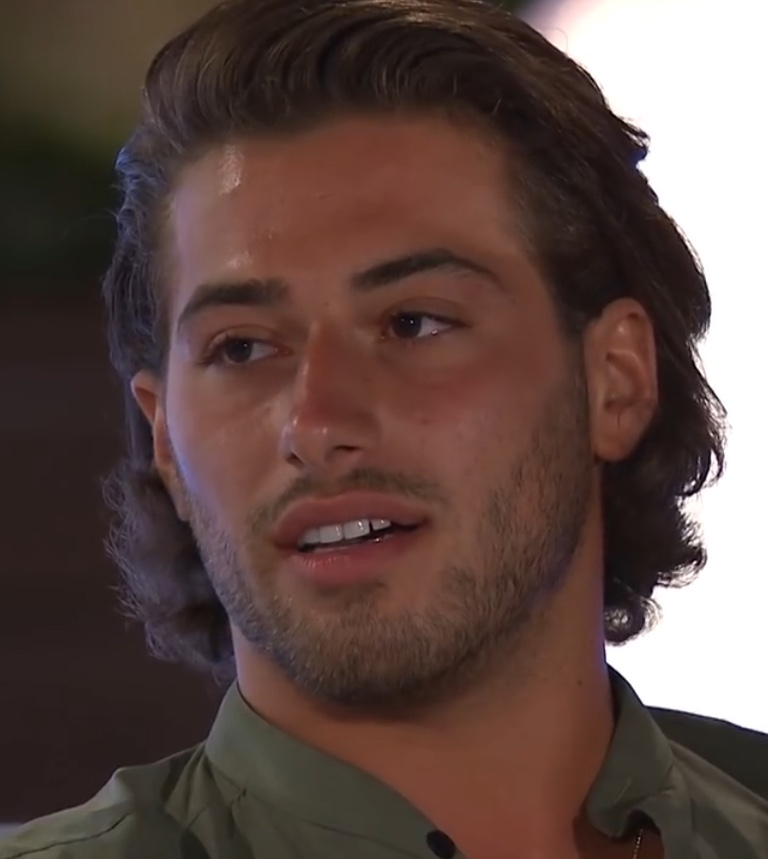
Kem Cetinay

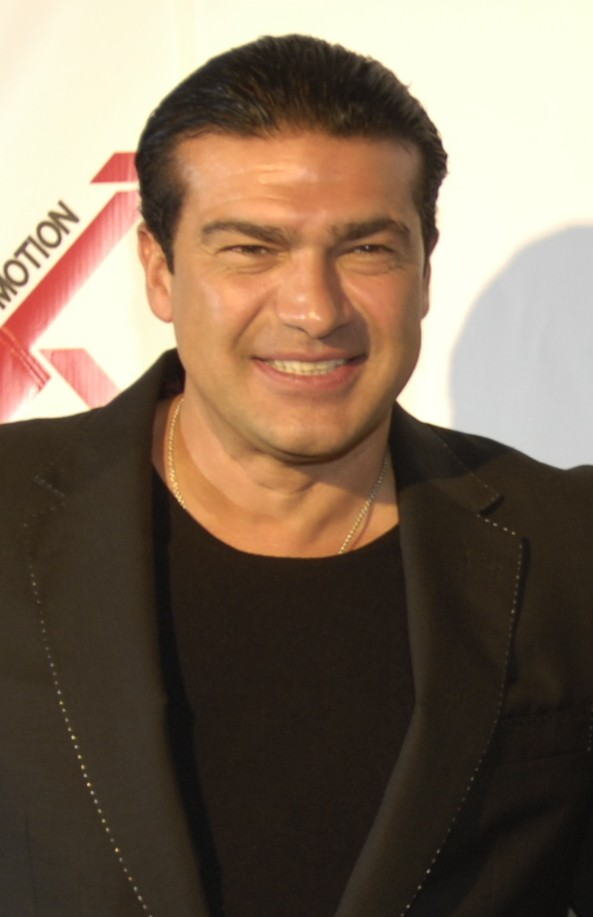
Tamer Hassan

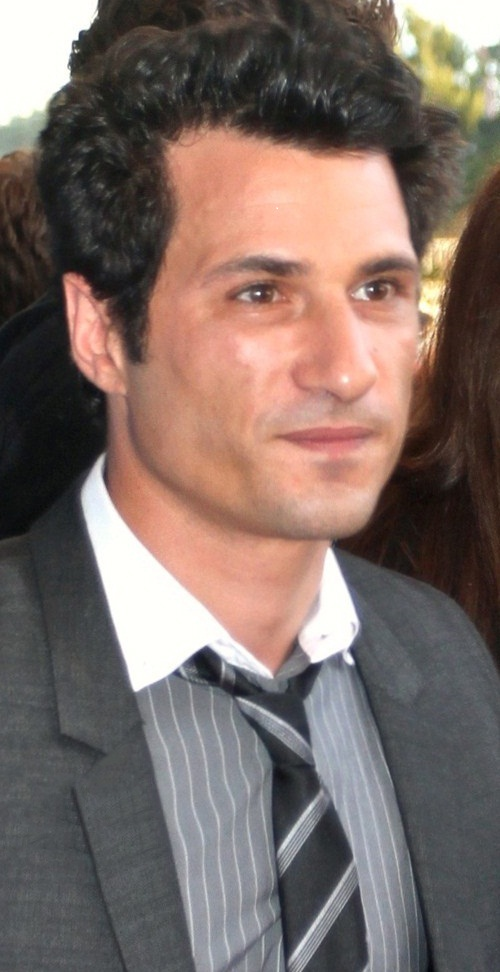
Hal Ozsan

- Farah Zeynep Abdullah (born 1989), actress (Turkish Iraqi father and Turkish/Macedonian/Bosnian mother)
- Nej Adamson (born 1958), actor (Turkish Cypriot origin)
- Yashar Adem (1940–2014), actor
- Yasemin Allen (born 1989), actor
- Josef Altin (born 1983), actor
- Philip Arditti (born 1979), actor and writer
- Lily-Rose Aslandogdu (born 2003), actress
- Sertan Baykara, broadcast journalist and presenter (Turkish German origin)
- Feri Cansel (1944–1983), actress (Turkish Cypriot origin)
- Zümrüt Cansel (born 1963), actress (Turkish Cypriot origin)
- Ekin-Su Cülcüloğlu (born 1994), actress, model and TV personality
- Kem Cetinay (born 1995), TV personality and rapper (Turkish Cypriot origin)
- Aslı Enver (born 1984), actress (Turkish Cypriot father and Turkish mother)
- Bilge Ebiri (born 1973), film critic and filmmaker
- Ela-May Demircan (born 2006), actress
- Dodi Fayed (1955–1997), film producer and partner of Diana, Princess of Wales (Egyptian-born to Samira Khashoggi who was of Turkish Saudi origin)
- Mem Ferda (born 1963), actor (Turkish Cypriot origin)
- Ayda Field (born 1979), American-born actress, panelist on Loose Women and The X Factor (Turkish father)
- Akin Gazi, actor (Turkish Cypriot origin)
- Sienna Guillory (born 1975), actress (Cuban-Turkish origin)
- Tamer Hassan (born 1968), actor (Turkish Cypriot origin)
- Belle Hassan, Season 5 of Love Island (Turkish Cypriot father)
- Aykut Hilmi, actor (Turkish Cypriot origin)
- Selin Hizli (born 1989), actress
- Metin Hüseyin (born 1959), film director (Turkish Cypriot origin)
- Yıldız Kenter (1928–2019), actress (Turkish father)
- Skandar Keynes (born 1991), actor (Turkish Lebanese origin)
- Emma Kingston (born 1991), stage actress
- Buket Kömür (born 1998), actress
- Jodhi May (born 1975), actress
- Erim Metto (born 1966), film director (Turkish Cypriot origin)
- Mem Morrison, actor (Turkish Cypriot origin)
- Erkan Mustafa (born 1970), actor (Turkish Cypriot origin)
- Tam Mutu (1978), actor
- Serkan Nihat (born 1983), Turkish–British filmmaker based in London
- Cosh Omar, actor and playwright (Turkish Cypriot origin)
- Hal Ozsan (born 1976), Hollywood actor (Turkish Cypriot origin)
- Moustafa Palazli, actor (Turkish Western Thracian origin)
- Tolga Safer (born 1982), actor (Turkish Cypriot origin)
- Meliz Serman, stage actress (Turkish Cypriot origin)
- Kemal Shahin, Big Brother contestant (Turkish Cypriot origin)
- Anna Silk (born 1974), actress (Canadian-born to a British-Turkish Cypriot mother)
- Ilkay Silk, CC (born 1948), actress, playwright, producer, and educator (Turkish Cypriot origin)
- Ayşe Tezel (born 1980), actress (Turkish father)
- Aden Theobald, Big Brother contestant (Turkish Cypriot mother)
- Özgür Uyanık, director
- Sezer Yurtseven, Big Brother contestant (Turkish Cypriot origin)
- Anatol Yusef (born 1978), actor (Turkish Cypriot origin)
- Razane Jammal (born 1987), British-Lebanese actress

== Fashion ==
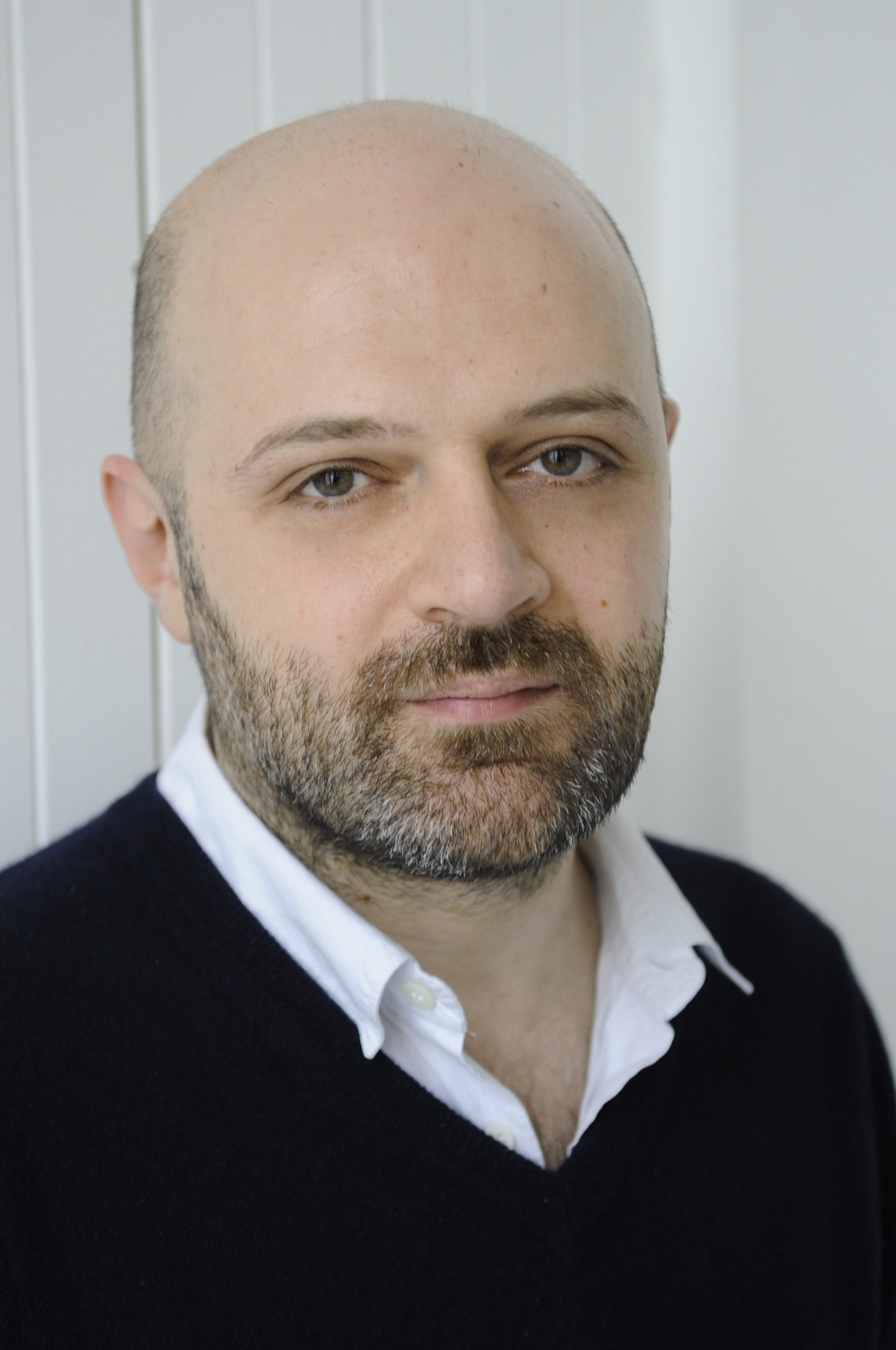
Hussein Chalayan

- Bora Aksu, fashion designer
- Mert Alas, fashion photographer
- Mustafa Aslanturk, fashion designer (Turkish Cypriot origin)
- Hussein Chalayan, MBE (born 1970), fashion designer (Turkish Cypriot origin)
- Dilara Fındıkoğlu (born 1990), fashion designer
- Nasir Mazhar, fashion designer (Turkish Cypriot origin)
- Erdem Moralioğlu (born 1977), fashion designer (Canadian-born to a Turkish father)
- Funda Önal (born 1981), model
- Rifat Ozbek (born 1953), fashion designer

== Food ==
- Leyla Kazim (born 1985), writer and media personality
- Selin Kiazim, chef and winner of the Great British Menu (Turkish Cypriot origin)
- Hüseyin Özer (born 1949), celebrity chef
- Silvena Rowe (born 1964), celebrity chef and food writer (Turkish Bulgarian father)
- Atilla Iskifoglu (born 1988), master mixologist
- Priscilla Mary Işın (born 1951), food historian

== House of Osman ==
- Prince Azmet Jah (born 1960), current head of the House of Asaf Jah and the titular 9th Nizam of Hyderabad and Berar; professional photographer (son of Ottoman Princess Esra)
- Dürrüşehvar Sultan (1914–2006), Princess of Berar and Imperial Princess of the Ottoman Empire
- Naz Osmanoglu (born 1985), comedian and member of the Imperial House of Osman
- Şehzade Osman Selaheddin Osmanoğlu (born 1940), son of the Şehzade Ali Vasib, 41st head of the Imperial House of Osman and Mukbile Sultan
  - Ayşe Gülnev Sultan Osmanoğlu (born 1971), author and historian
    - Sultanzade Max Ali Sutton (born 2000)
    - Sultanzade Cosmo Tarik Sutton (born 2001)
    - Sultanzade Lysander Gengiz Sutton (born 2003)
    - Tatyana Aliye Hanımsultan Sutton (born 2005)
    - Sultanzade Ferdinand Ziya Sutton (born 2006)
  - Şehzade Orhan Murad Osmanoğlu (born 1972)
    - Şehzade Turan Cem Osmanoğlu (born 2004)
    - Şehzade Tamer Nihad Osmanoğlu (born 2006)
  - Şehzade Nihad Reşad Osmanoğlu (1978–1978)

== Law ==
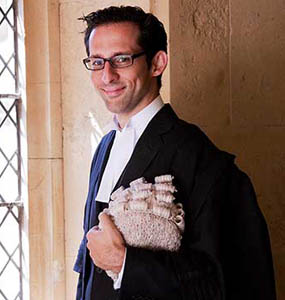
- Can Yeğinsu
  Gönül Başaran Erönen (born 1953), judge in the TRNC Supreme Court (Turkish Cypriot origin)
- Can Yeğinsu (born 1980), barrister and international lawyer

== Music ==
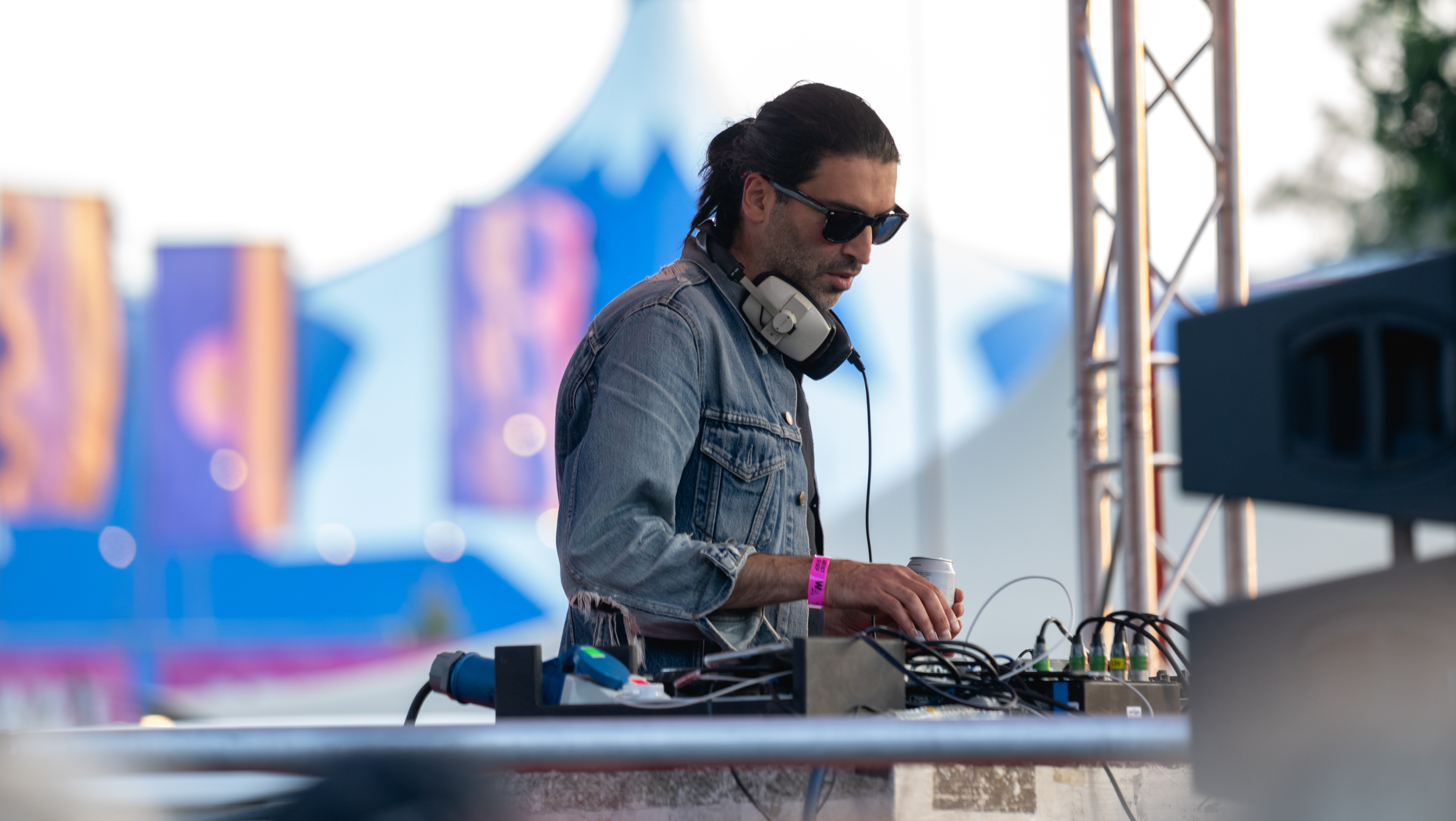
Erol Alkan

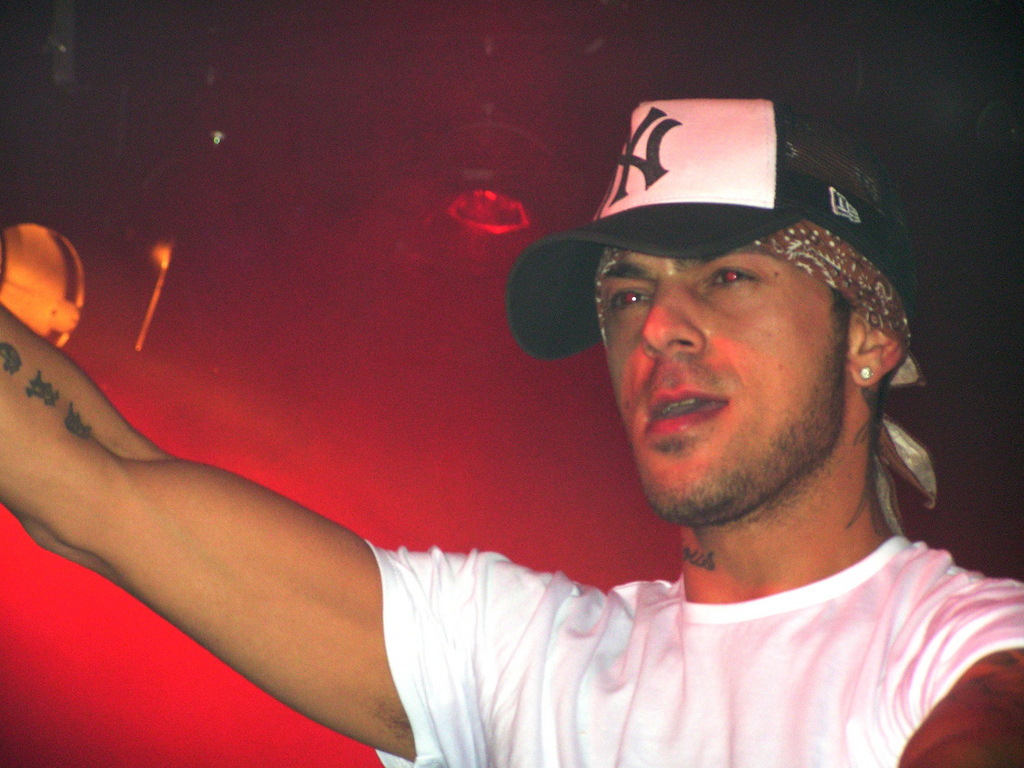
Abs Breen

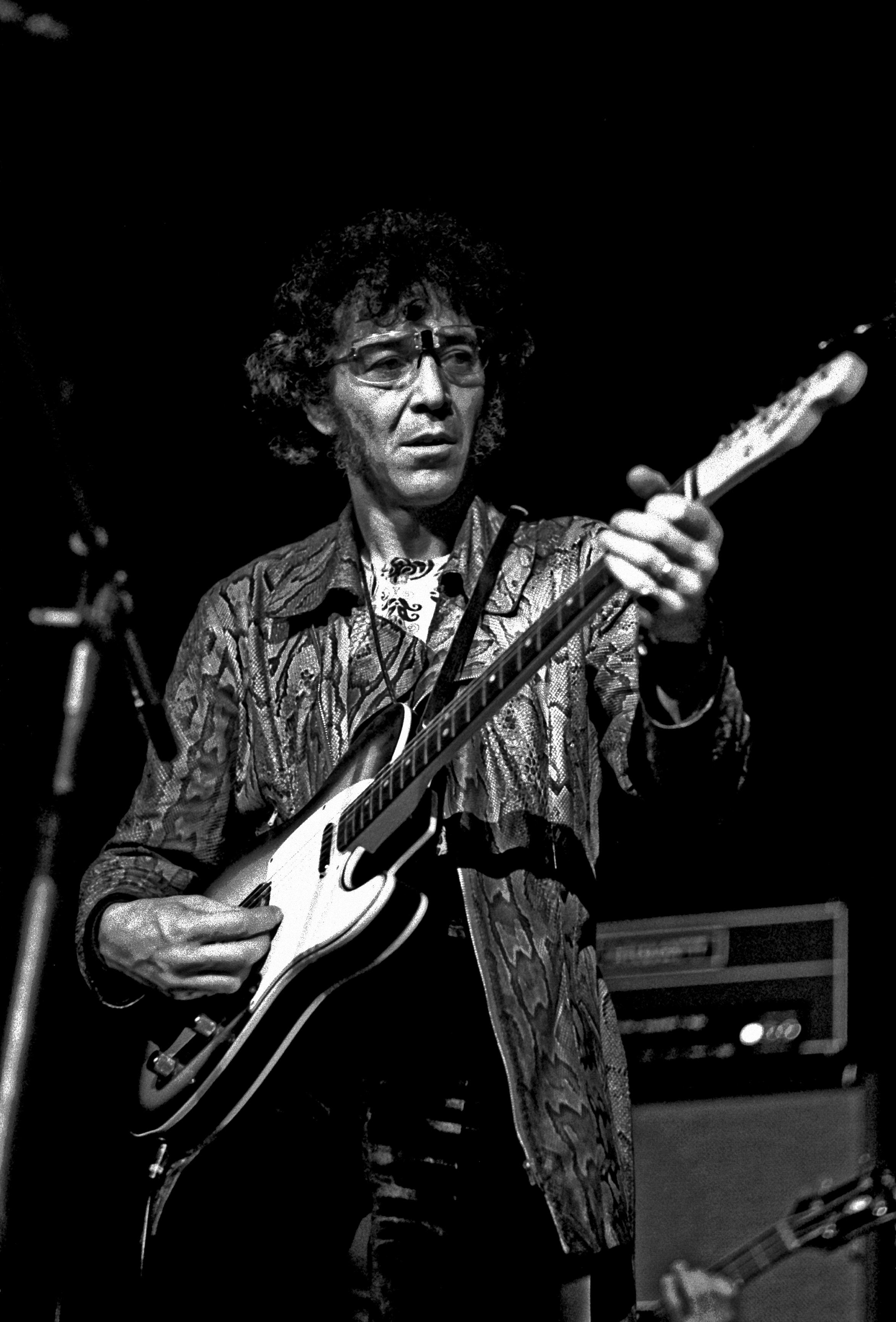
Alexis Korner

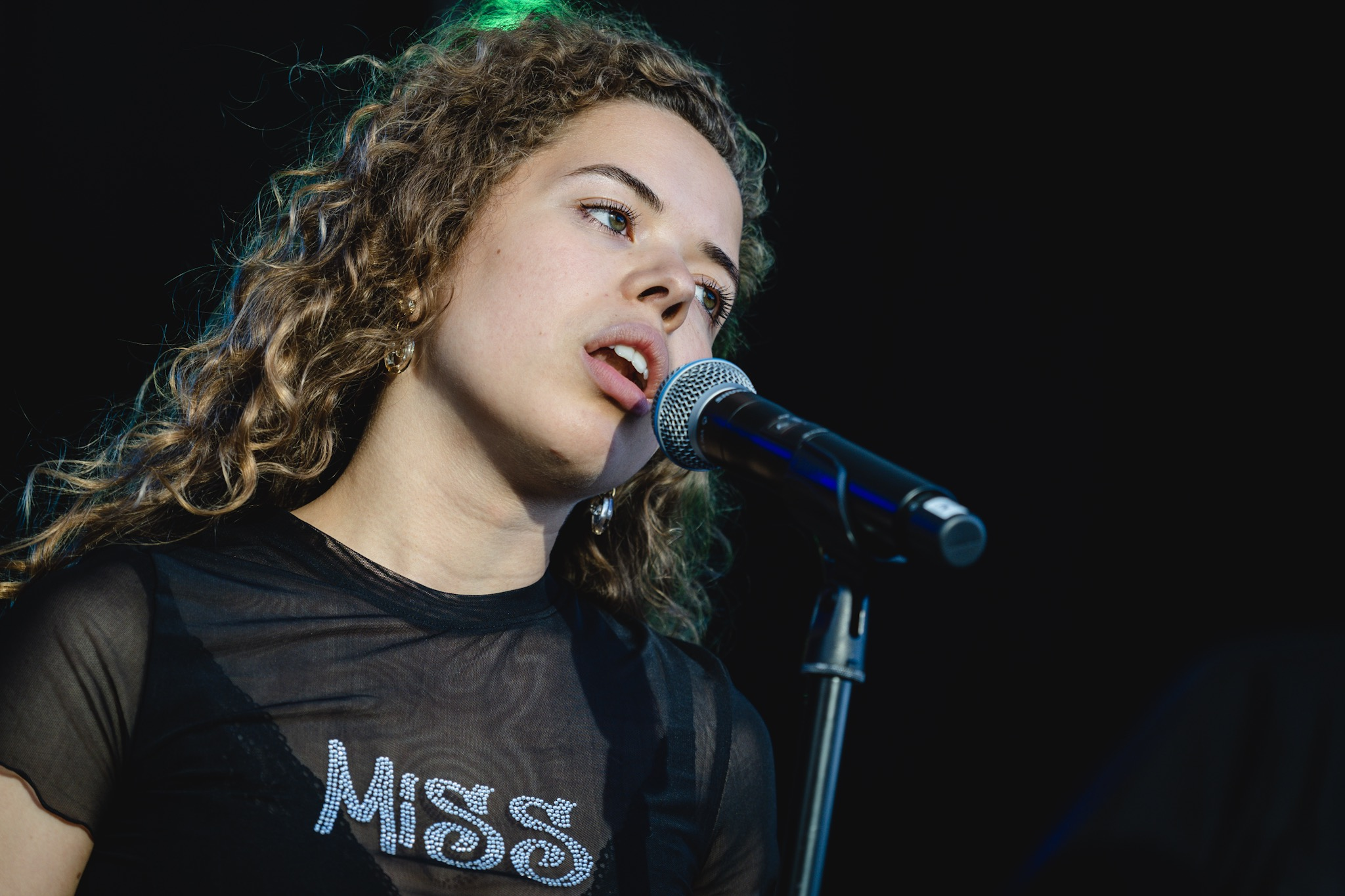
Nilüfer Yanya

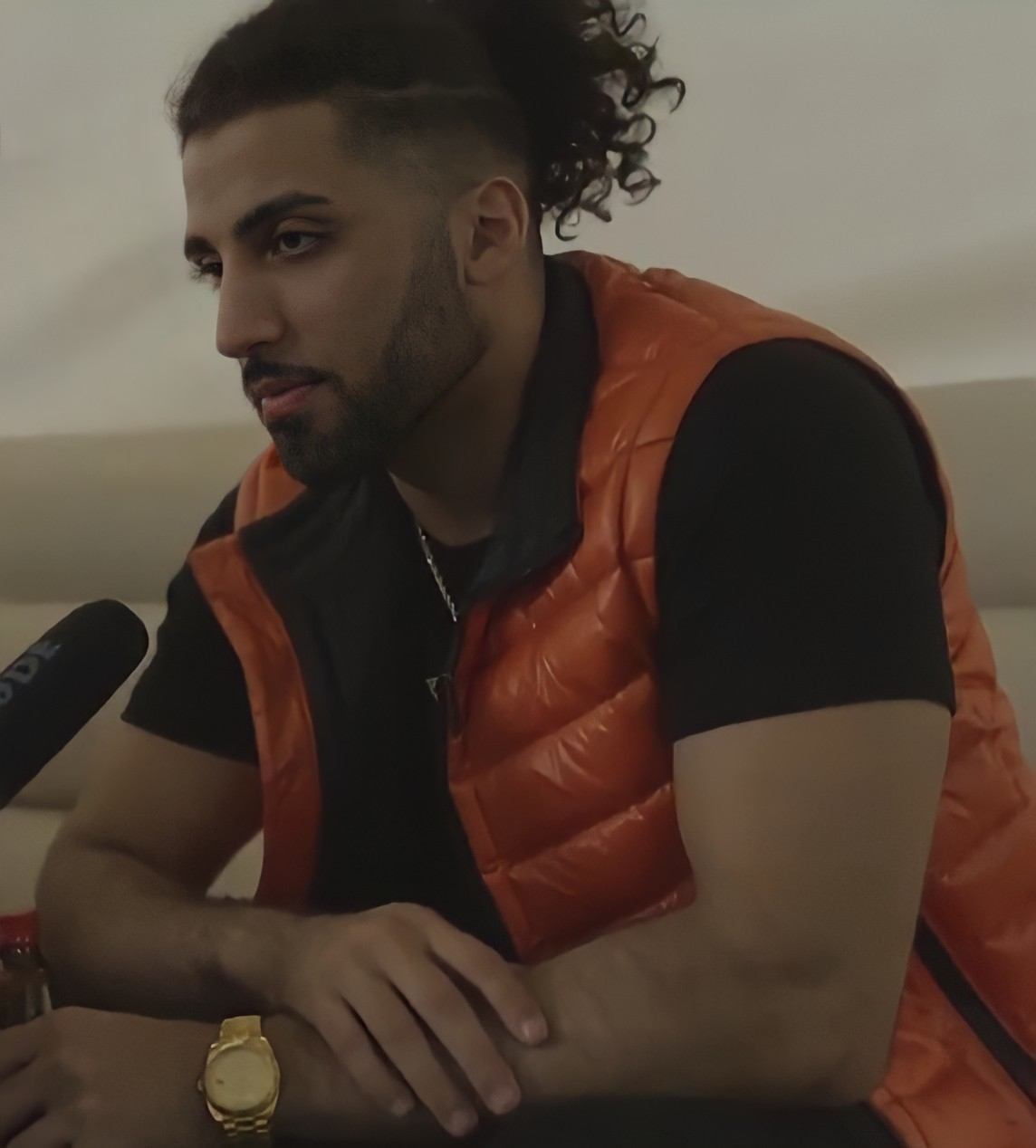
B Young

- Emre Aracı (born 1968), music historian, conductor, and composer
- Erol Alkan (born 1974), DJ and producer (Turkish Cypriot origin)
- Peri Aziz, singer and former member of Babutsa (Turkish Cypriot origin)
- Abs Breen (born 1979), singer and former member of the former boy band Five (Turkish father)
- Mine Dogantan-Dack, concert pianist, musicologist and music theorist; Performance Teaching Associate at the University of Cambridge
- Salih Can Gevrek, pianist
- Yusuf Güney (born 1984), singer
- Adam Harison, singer-songwriter; appeared on Little Mix The Search; and pitch invader during the 2020 UEFA European Football Championship final match (Turkish Cypriot origin)
- Atila Huseyin, jazz singer (Turkish Cypriot origin)
- Adem Ilhan (born 1977), musician
- Inji (born 2001), singer and songwriter
- Jax Jones (born 1987), DJ, songwriter, record producer and remixer (Turkish father)
- Selin Macieira-Boşgelmez member of Lambrini Girls an English punk rock group
- Işın Karaca (born 1973), singer (Turkish Cypriot mother and Turkish father)
- Tolga Kashif (born 1962), music conductor (Turkish Cypriot origin)
- Eylem Kızıl, singer (Turkish Cypriot origin)
- Alexis Korner (1928–1984), blues musician and radio broadcaster (Turkish/Greek/Austrian mother)
- Lara Melda (born 1993), concert pianist
- Gülsin Onay (1954), concert pianist
- Murat Onay, rapper and singer-songwriter
- Lara Ömeroğlu (born 1993), pianist
- Ayla Peksoylu, singer and songwriter (Turkish Cypriot origin)
- Tony Perry, Wembley Stadium DJ; introduced the song Sweet Caroline as England's unofficial anthem during the 2020 UEFA European Football Championship (Turkish Cypriot origin)
- Ziynet Sali (born 1975), singer (Turkish Cypriot origin)
- Sinan Savaskan (born 1954), composer
- Ali Sönmez (born in 1962), lead singer of Babutsa (Turkish Cypriot origin)
- Tash, singer (Turkish Cypriot origin)
- Emre Turkmen, member of Years & Years, an English electropop band formed in London
- Hakan Tuna, rock musician; member of the band Natural Life (Turkish Cypriot origin)
- Soner Türsoy (born in 1965), member of Babutsa(Turkish Cypriot origin)
- Nilüfer Yanya (born 1995), singer-songwriter, composer and musician (Turkish father)
- B Young (born 1995), rapper and singer-songwriter (Turkish Cypriot origin)

== Religion ==
- Ramadan Güney (1932–2006), businessman and politician; founder of the Shacklewell Lane Mosque, the first Turkish mosque in the UK; and former owner of the UK's largest cemetery Brookwood Cemetery (Turkish Cypriot origin)

== Politics ==
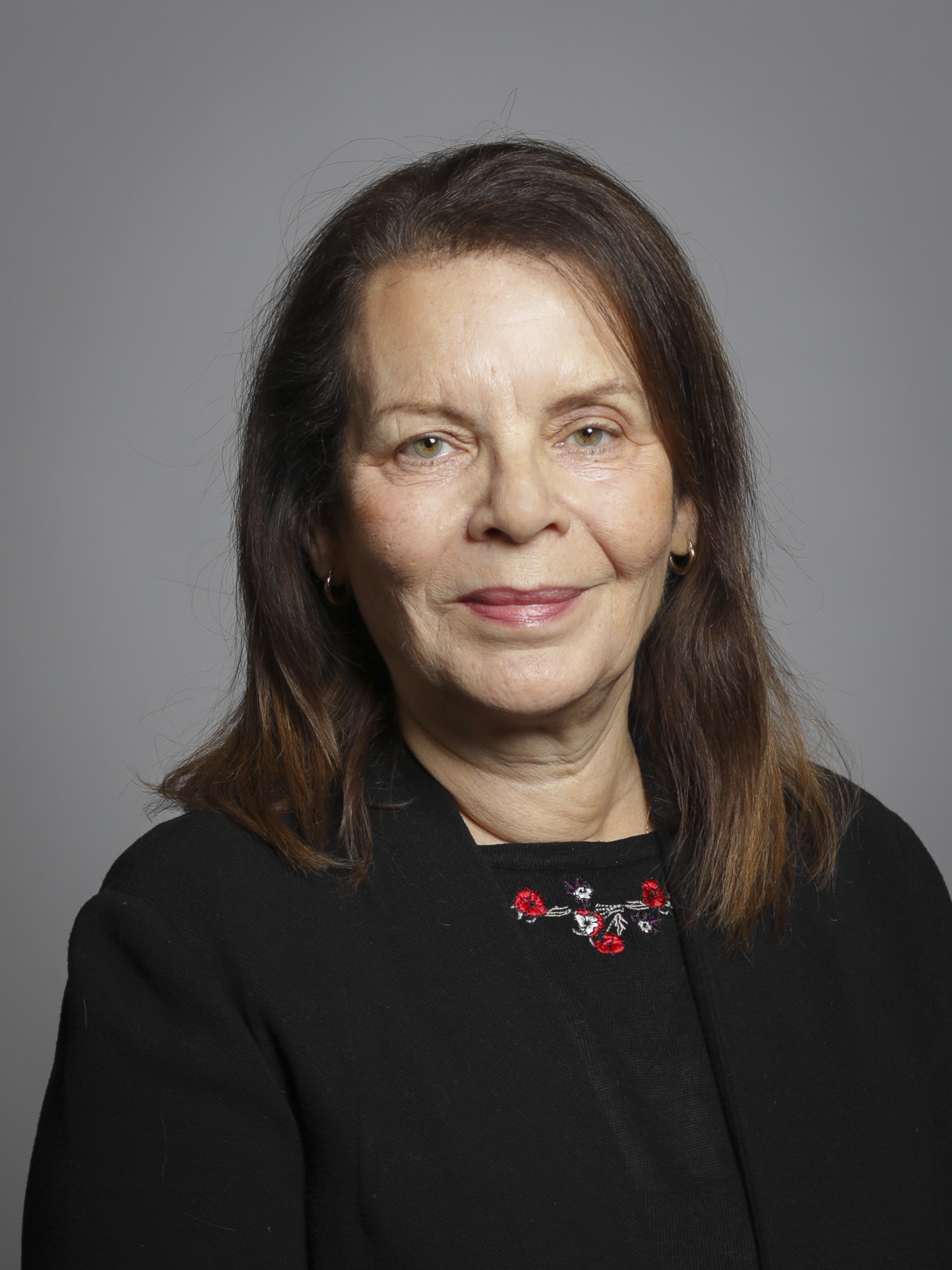
Meral Hussein-Ece

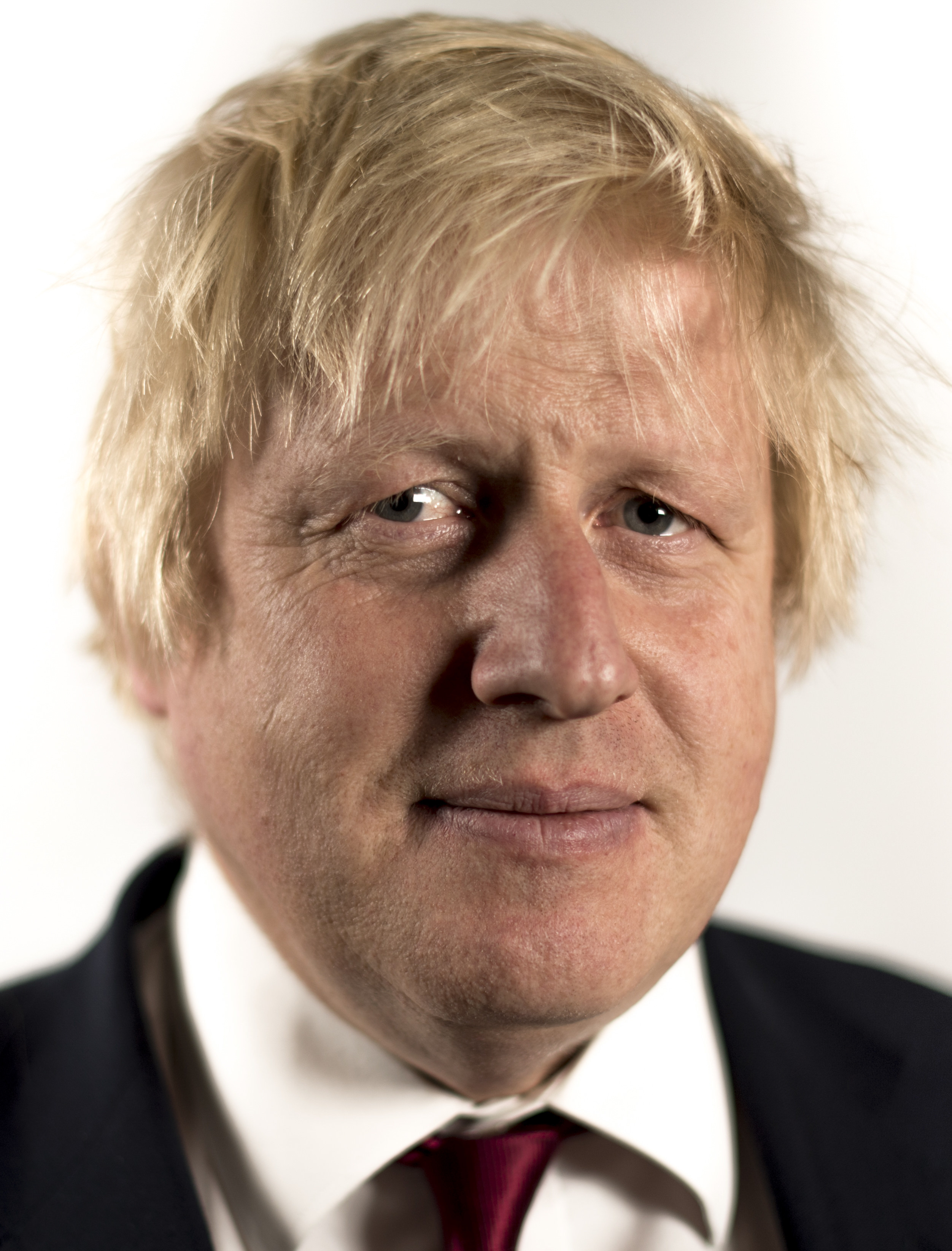
Boris Johnson

- Peray Ahmet, leader of Haringey London Borough Council (Turkish Cypriot origin)
- Tim Aker (born 1985), Member of the European Parliament in 2014-19 (Turkish father)
- Nesil Caliskan (born 1988), Labour MP; Comptroller of the Household; Enfield London Borough Council's first female leader (Turkish Cypriot origin)
- Mete Coban, MBE, Labour Councillor for Stoke Newington; founder of My Life My Say (Turkish Cypriot origin)
- Meral Hussein-Ece, Baroness Hussein-Ece (born 1955), Liberal Democrats member of the House of Lords (Turkish Cypriot origin)
- Emma Edhem (born 1966), Alderman in the City of London Corporation (Turkish Cypriot origin)
- Richard Hickmet (1947–2024), Conservative MP in 1983-87 (Turkish Cypriot origin)
- Boris Johnson (born 1964), former Prime Minister of the United Kingdom (Turkish great-grandfather)
- Jo Johnson (born 1971), politician; former Minister of State for Universities, Science, Research and Innovation; former Minister for London (Turkish great-grandfather)
- Stanley Johnson (born 1940), Member of the European Parliament in 1979-84 (Turkish grandfather)
- Alp Mehmet MVO (born 1948), British Ambassador to Iceland in 2004 (Turkish Cypriot origin)
- Özdil Nami (born 1967), Minister of Foreign Affairs of Northern Cyprus (Turkish Cypriot origin)
- Sabri Ozaydin, Mayor of Enfield
- Kenan Poleo, British Consul General and Trade Commissioner for Eastern Europe and Central Asia (Turkish Cypriot origin)

== Sports ==
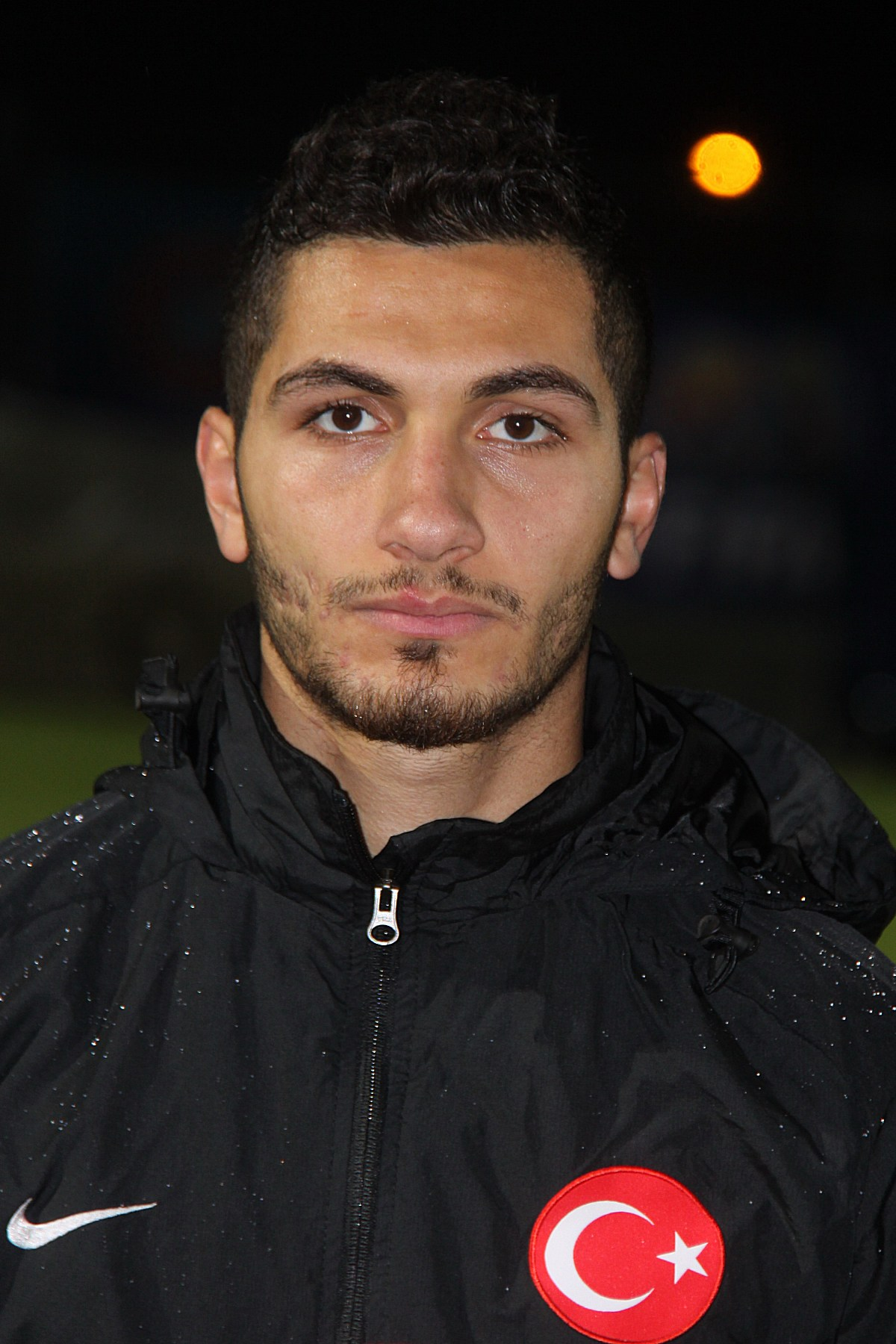
Kamil Çörekçi

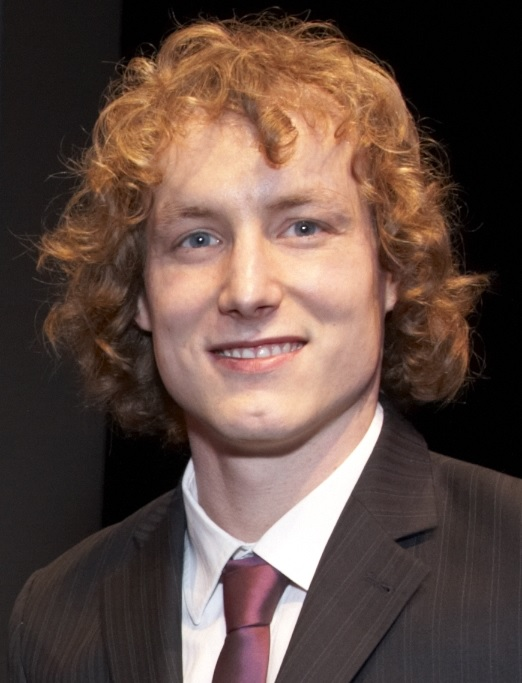
Dervis Konuralp

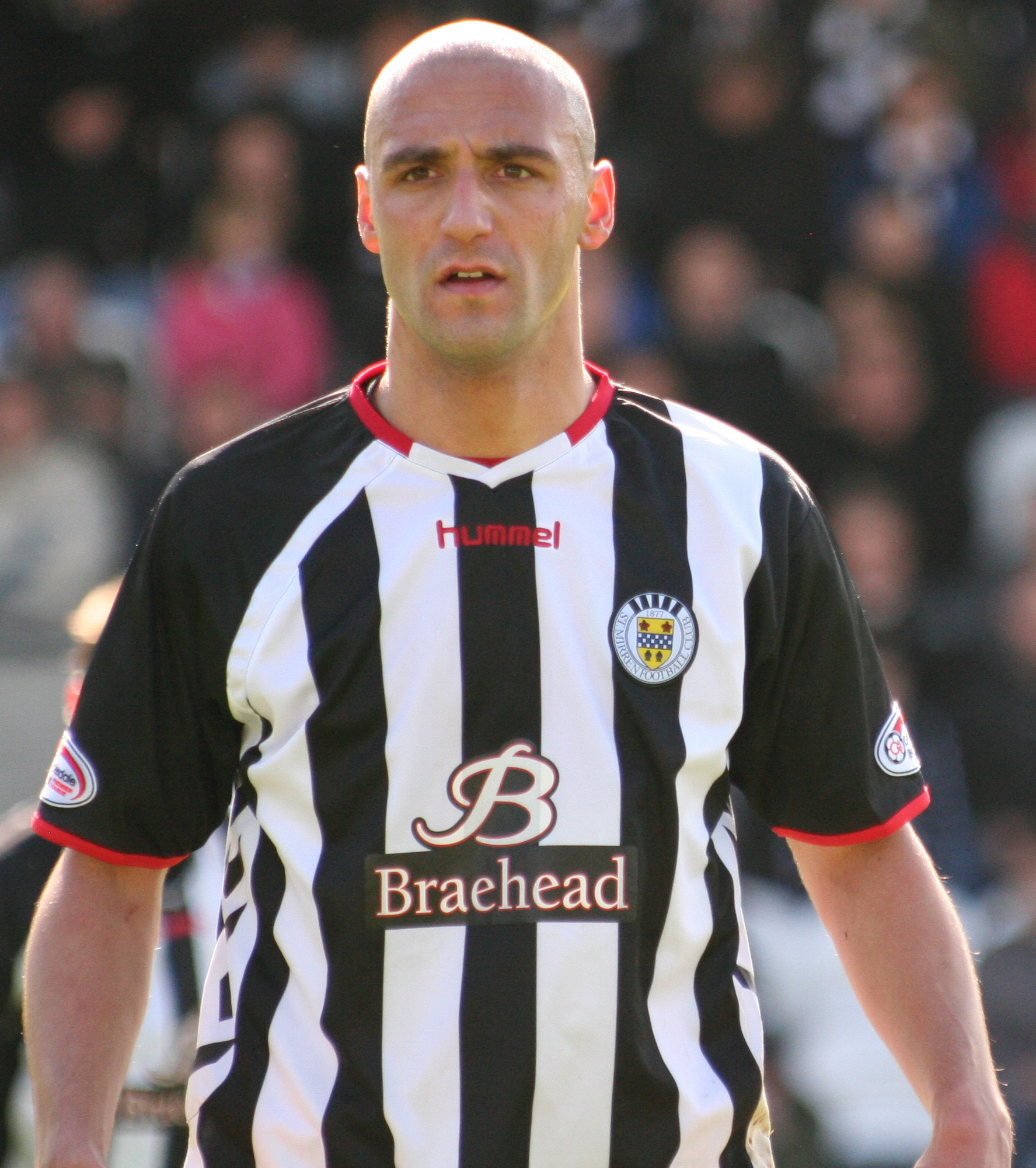
Billy Mehmet

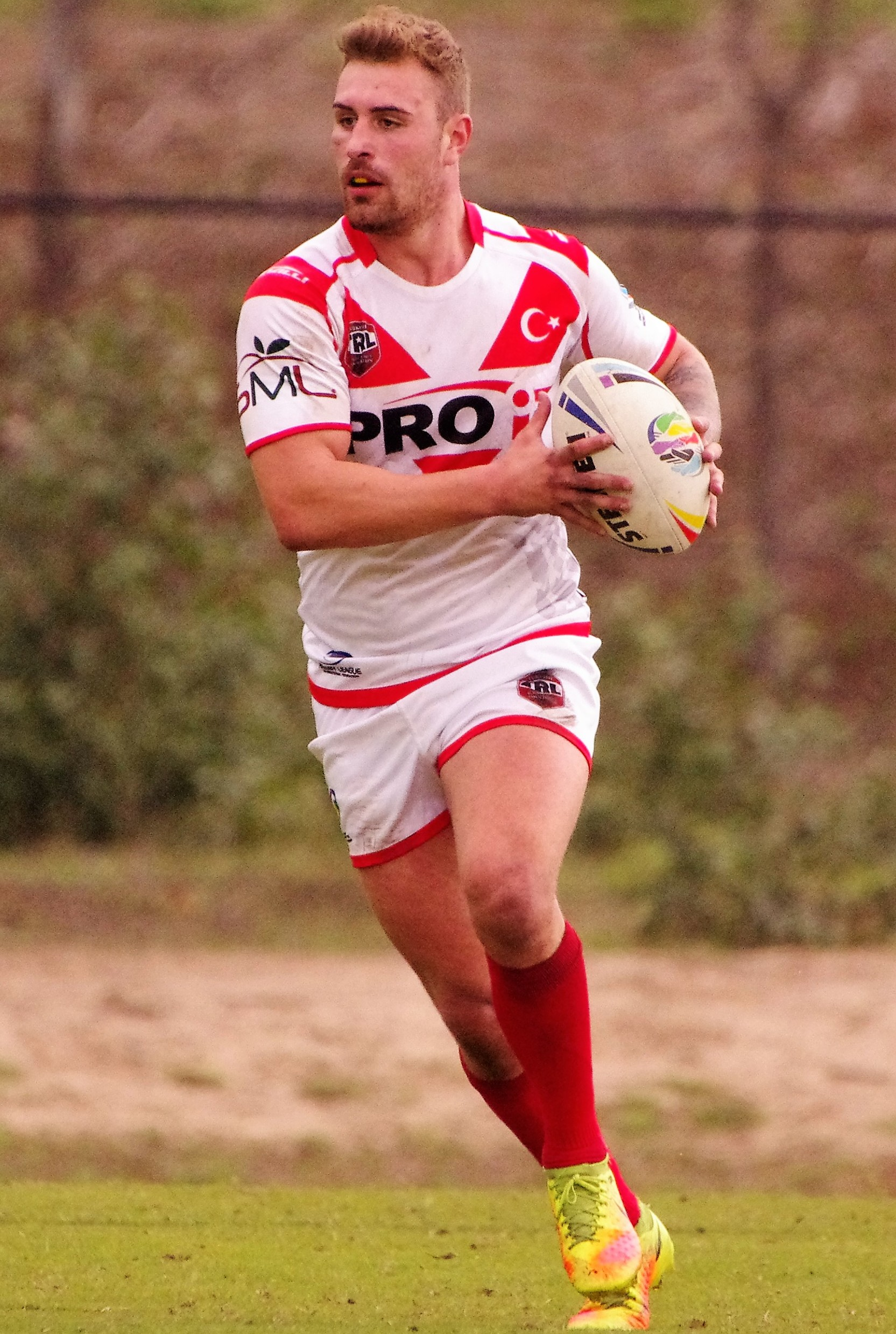
Jansin Turgut

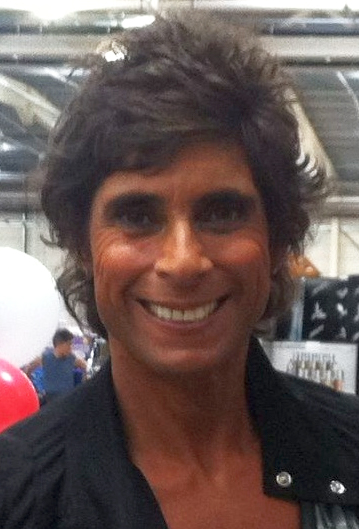
Fatima Whitbread

- Matthew Metin Ahmet (born 1988), Shaolin Kung Fu
- Yusuf Aydin (born 2000), rugby player (Turkish father)
- Daniel Barlaser (born 1997), football player (Turkish father)
- Atif Bashir (born 1985), football player (Turkish German mother)
- Neşet Bellikli (born 1998), football player
- Adam Booth (born 1969), boxing trainer and manager of David Haye (Turkish Cypriot father)
- Rhian Brewster (born 2000), football player (Turkish Cypriot mother)
- Dennis Cirkin (born 2002), football player
- Hakan Duyan Burton, football player
- Andrew Chandler (born 1953), professional golfer
- Kamil Ahmet Çörekçi (born 1992), football player (Turkish Cypriot origin)
- Umit Eminoglu (born 1994), football player
- Hasan Er, Deaflympics football player
- Hüseyin Er (1985–2021), Deaflympics football player
- Murat Erdoğan (born 1976), football player (Turkish Cypriot origin)
- Mel Filis (born 2002), football player
- Taylan Harris (born 2005), football player
- Hakan Hayrettin (born 1970), football player (Turkish Cypriot origin)
- Hale Hüseyin, football player and captain of the England U-18 Women's National Team (Turkish Cypriot origin)
- Halle Houssein (born 2004), football player
- Mustafa Hussein, football player (Turkish Cypriot origin)
- Kemal Izzet (born 1980), coach and former football player (Turkish Cypriot origin)
- Muzzy Izzet (born 1974), football player (Turkish Cypriot origin)
- Erol Kahraman, ice hockey player (Turkish Cypriot parents)
- Jem Karacan (born 1989), football player (Turkish Cypriot origin)
- Sonay Kartal (born 2001), professional tennis player
- Colin Kazim-Richards (born 1986), football player (Turkish Cypriot mother)
- Kaan Kevser-Junior, football player
- Eren Kinali (born 2000), football player
- Dervis Konuralp (born 1980), Paralympic swimmer (Turkish Cypriot father)
- Billy Mehmet (born 1984), football player (Turkish Cypriot origin)
- Dave Mehmet (1960–2024), football player (Turkish Cypriot origin)
- Deniz Mehmet (born 1992), football player (Turkish Cypriot origin)
- Yusuf Mersin (born 1994), football player
- Sam Mussabini (1867–1927), athletics coach (Italian-Turkish parents)
- Tarkan Mustafa (born 1973), football player (Turkish Cypriot origin)
- Erhun Oztumer (born 1991), football player (Turkish Cypriot origin)
- Ahmet Patterson, boxer (Turkish Cypriot father)
- Omer Riza (born 1979), football player (Turkish Cypriot origin)
- Danis Salman (born 1960), football player (Turkish Cypriot origin)
- Jason Tahincioglu (born 1983), racecar driver
- Mumtaz Tahincioglu (born 1952), President of the Turkish Motorsports Federation
- Aryan Tajbakhsh (born 1990), football player (Turkish Iranian origin)
- Emre Tezgel (born 2005), football player
- Mustafa Tiryaki (born 1987), football player
- Acelya Toprak (born 1998), youngest winner at the European Judo Championships (Turkish Cypriot origin)
- Tamer Tuna (born 1991), football player (Turkish Cypriot father)
- Jansin Turgut (born 1996), rugby player (Turkish father)
- Fatima Whitbread (born 1961), javelin thrower (Turkish Cypriot origin)
- Lev Yalcin (born 1985), football player (Turkish father)
- Halil Zorba (born 1988), weightlifter (Turkish Cypriot origin)

== Victims of crime ==
- Patrick Azimkar, British soldier killed during the Massereene Barracks shooting in 2009 (Turkish Cypriot father)
- Aysha Frade, victim killed during the 2017 Westminster attack (Turkish Cypriot father)
- Martyn Hett, victim killed during the 2017 Manchester Arena bombing (Turkish mother)
- Necati Zontul, tortured in detention in Greece because of his sexual orientation

== Miscellaneous ==
- Arifs, criminal gang (Turkish Cypriot origin)
- Ferhan Azman, Turkish-born architect
- George Blake (1922–2020), Secret Intelligence Service (MI6) spy and double agent for Soviet Union
- Beyhan Murphy (born 1958), dancer and wife of musician Peter Murphy

== See also ==
- British Turks
- Turkish community of London
- Lists of British people
