= List of British people of Cypriot descent =

This is a list of notable British Cypriots.

== Greek Cypriots ==
- Christos "Chris" Achilléos, painter and illustrator
- Theo Adams, performance artist
- Karima Adebibe, actress and model
- Andreas "Andrew" Adonis, Labour peer, politician, academic and journalist
- James Alexandrou, actor and television presenter
- Anthony Anaxagorou, writer and poet
- Peter Andre, singer-songwriter, businessman, presenter and television personality
- Lisa Andreas, singer
- Dean Atta, poet
- Antigoni Buxton, singer-songwriter
- Tonia Buxton, television presenter and restauranteur
- Christian and Nick Candy, property developers
- Jake and Dinos Chapman, artists
- Bambos Charalambous, Labour politician
- Anastasios Christodoulou, foundation secretary of the Open University
- Charlie Christodoulou, soldier and mercenary
- Stephen Constantine, football manager
- Tula "Tulisa" Contostavlos, singer-songwriter
- Antony Costa, singer-songwriter and actor
- Peter Costa, professional poker player
- Memnos Costi, television presenter and football player
- Dappy, real name Costadinos Contostavlos, rapper
- Charidimos "Harry" Demetriou, professional poker player
- Jamie Demetriou, actor and comedian, brother of Natasia
- Jason Demetriou, football player
- Mickey Demetriou, football player
- Natasia Demetriou, actress and comedian, sister of Jamie
- Artemas Diamandis, singer
- Chris Dicomidis, rugby union player
- Sapphire Elia, actress, model and singer
- Barry Evangeli, music producer
- Costas Georgiou, soldier and mercenary
- George Georgiou, photographer and photojournalist
- Michael Georgiou, snooker player
- Cat Stevens, also known as Yusuf Islam, real name Steven Georgiou, singer-songwriter and education philanthropist
- Jasmine Harman, television presenter
- Demis Hassabis, artificial intelligence researcher, neuroscientist, computer game designer, and gamer
- D. G. Hessayon, gardener and writer
- Sarah Ioannides, conductor
- Mick Karn, real name Andonis Michaelides, musician and songwriter
- Simon Kassianides, actor, film director, producer and screenwriter
- Anthony Kleanthous, football chairman
- Jason Koumas, football player
- Harry Kyprianou, football player
- Andi Kyriacou, rugby union player
- Dimitri Leonidas, actor
- Stephanie Leonidas, actress
- Georgina Leonidas, actress
- Leonidas Leonidou, independent researcher and author
- Kristian Leontiou, rock singer
- Jack Monroe, poverty campaigner
- George Michael, real name Georgios Panayiotou, singer-songwriter and record producer
- Alex Michaelides, author and screenwriter
- Nick Mohammed, actor and comedian
- Robert Newman, comedian
- Daniel Neofetou, writer and theorist
- Andrew Nicolaides, surgeon and medical expert
- Kypros Nicolaides, medical expert
- Alexis Nicolas, football player
- Nicky Nicolau, football player
- Antonis Nikolaidis, Commonwealth shooter
- Costa Panayi, computer game programmer
- James Panayi, football player
- Irena Papadopoulos, nursing researcher
- Linda Papadopoulos, psychologist and author
- Panayiotis "Peter" Paphides, journalist and broadcast
- Theo Paphitis, entrepreneur and broadcaster
- Michael Paraskos, novelist and art critic
- Andy Paul, born Andreas Pavlou, musician and singer-songwriter
- Stelios "Stel" Pavlou, author and screenwriter
- Mike Pilavachi, charismatic Christian evangelist and author
- Peter Polycarpou, actor
- Jack Roles, football player
- Giannis Sampson, football player
- Sarbel, real name Sarbel Michael, singer
- Sir Reo Stakis, hotel magnate
- Alex Stavrinou, football player
- Chris Toumazou, electronic engineer
- Andros Townsend, football player
- Chris Tsangarides, record producer, sound engineer, and mixer
- Tom Williams, footballer (Cypriot mother)
- Nico Yennaris, football player
- Haris Zambarloukos, cinematographer

== Turkish Cypriots ==
- Nej Adamson, actor
- Alev Adil, writer, artist and academic
- Peray Ahmet, leader of Haringey London Borough Council
- Aydin Mehmet Ali, author and peace campaigner
- Erol Alkan, DJ and producer
- Mustafa Aslanturk, fashion designer
- Patrick Azimkar, British soldier killed during the Massereene Barracks shooting in 2009
- Peri Aziz, singer and former member of Babutsa
- Raşit Bağzıbağlı, fashion designer
- Süleyman Başak, Professor of Finance at the London Business School
- Adam Booth, boxing trainer and manager of David Haye
- Rhian Brewster, football player
- Nesil Caliskan, Enfield London Borough Council's first female leader
- Feri Cansel, actress
- Zümrüt Cansel, actress
- Kem Cetinay, TV personality and rapper
- Alkan Chaglar, journalist
- Hussein Chalayan, fashion designer
- Tice Cin, writer, editor, and multidisciplinary artist
- Mete Coban, Labour Councillor for Stoke Newington; founder of My Life My Say
- Mutlu Çerkez, artist
- Kamil Ahmet Çörekçi, football player
- Mehmet Dalman, investment banker and chairman of Welsh football club Cardiff City
- Mustafa Djamgoz, Professor of Cancer Biology at Imperial College London and Chairman of the College of Medicine’s Science Council
- Baroness Meral Ece, Liberal Democrats member of the House of Lords
- Emma Edhem, councilwoman of the City of London Corporation
- Tracey Emin, artist
- Aslı Enver, actress
- Sümer Erek, artist
- Gönül Başaran Erönen, judge in the TRNC Supreme Court
- Ten Feizi, FMedSci FRS, Professor and Director of the Glycosciences Laboratory at Imperial College London
- Mem Ferda, actor
- Aysha Frade, victim killed during the 2017 Westminster attack
- Ali Guryel, founder of Bromcom
- Ramadan Güney, founder of the first Turkish mosque in the UK (Shacklewell Lane Mosque); and owner of the UK's largest cemetery Brookwood Cemetery
- Adam Harison, singer-songwriter; appeared on Little Mix The Search; and pitch invader during the 2020 UEFA European Football Championship final match
- Hattie Hasan, MBE, CEO of the Stopcocks Women Plumbers
- Tamer Hassan, actor
- Belle Hassan, Season 5 of Love Island
- Hakan Hayrettin, football player
- Richard Hickmet, Conservative MP in 1983-87
- Aykut Hilmi, actor
- Sibel Hodge, writer
- Mustafa Hulusi, artist
- Atila Huseyin, jazz singer
- Hale Hüseyin, football player and captain of the England U-18 Women's National Team
- Metin Hüseyin, film director
- Mustafa Hussein, football player
- Yaşar İsmailoğlu, poet
- Kemal Izzet, football player
- Muzzy Izzet, football player
- Erol Kahraman, ice hockey player
- Işın Karaca, singer
- Jem Karacan, football player
- Tolga Kashif, music conductor
- Leyla Kazim, food and travel photographer
- Colin Kazim-Richards, football player
- Eylem Kızıl, singer
- Fatma Kiamil, co-founder of JJ Food Service; listed in the Sunday Times Rich List 2020
- Mustafa Kiamil, co-founder of JJ Food Service; listed in the Sunday Times Rich List 2020
- Selin Kiazim, chef and winner of the Great British Menu
- Dervis Konuralp, Paralympic swimmer
- Nasir Mazhar, fashion designer
- Alp Mehmet MVO, British Ambassador to Iceland in 2004
- Billy Mehmet, football player
- Dave Mehmet, football player
- Deniz Mehmet, football player
- Erim Metto, film director
- Mem Morrison, actor
- Erkan Mustafa, actor
- Tarkan Mustafa, football player
- Asil Nadir, businessman
- Özdil Nami, Minister of Foreign Affairs of Northern Cyprus
- Cosh Omar, actor
- Arif Ozakca, artist
- Hal Ozsan, Hollywood actor
- Erhun Oztumer, football player
- Ahmet Patterson, boxer
- Tony Perry, Wembley Stadium DJ; introduced the song Sweet Caroline as England’s unofficial anthem during the 2020 UEFA European Football Championship
- Kenan Poleo, British Consul General and Trade Commissioner for Eastern Europe and Central Asia
- Omer Riza, football player
- Tolga Safer, actor
- Danis Salman, football player
- Meliz Serman, stage actress
- Kemal Shahin, Big Brother contestant
- Ziynet Sali, singer
- Anna Silk, actress
- Ilkay Silk, CC, actress, playwright, producer, and educator
- Ali Sönmez, lead singer of Babutsa
- Touker Suleyman, fashion retail entrepreneur and a "dragon" on Dragon's Den
- Tash, singer
- Aden Theobald, Big Brother contestant
- Hakan Tuna, rock musician; member of the band Natural Life
- Soner Türsoy, member of Babutsa
- Fatima Whitbread, javelin thrower
- B Young, rapper and singer-songwriter
- Zeren Wilson, food and wine specialist and columnist
- Sezer Yurtseven, Big Brother contestant
- Anatol Yusef, actor
- Halil Zorba, weightlifter

== See also ==
- List of Cypriots
- List of Turkish Cypriots
- British Cypriots
- Greek Cypriot diaspora
- Turkish Cypriot diaspora
