= Cyprus–United Kingdom relations =

- Cyprus: United Kingdom

Foreign relations between Cyprus and the United Kingdom are considered generally positive. Cyprus gained its independence from the United Kingdom in 1960, after 82 years of British control; the two countries now enjoy warm relations, though the continuing British sovereignty of Akrotiri and Dhekelia in Cyprus continues to divide Cypriots. The countries are both members of the United Nations and Commonwealth of Nations.

The United Kingdom has a High Commission in Nicosia and Cyprus has a High Commission in London. Irfan Siddiq is the current British High Commissioner to Cyprus, whilst Andreas Kakouris is the current Cypriot High Commissioner to the UK.

According to the results of a 2024 YouGov poll, 98% of British people who were asked about Cyprus had heard of it; 69% of these viewed Cyprus positively, while 26% remained neutral and the remaining 3% had a negative view.

== History ==
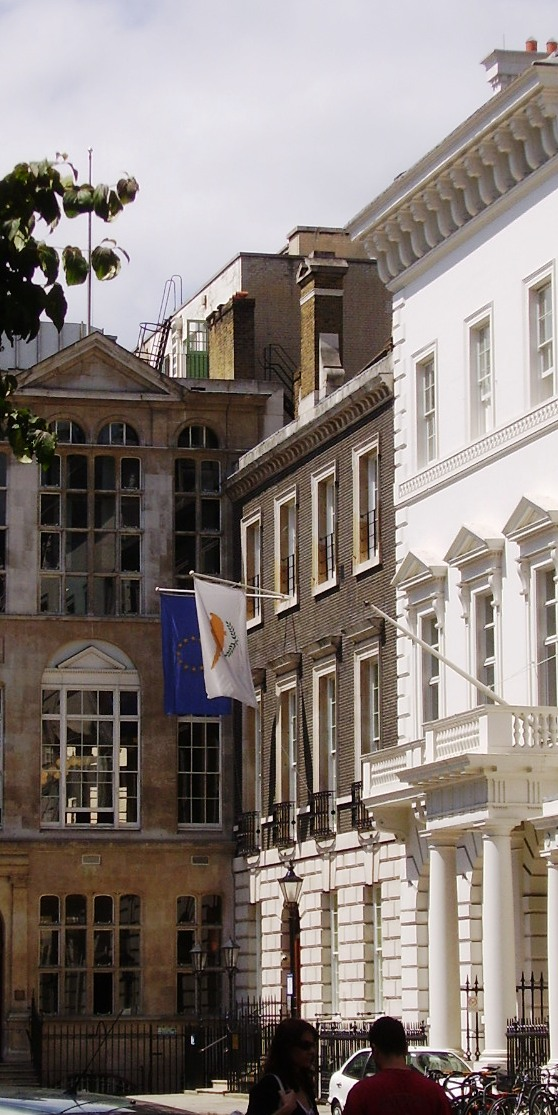
High Commission of Cyprus in London

Under Prime Minister Benjamin Disraeli and Foreign Minister Lord Salisbury, Britain used its diplomatic prowess to obtain Cyprus from the Ottoman Empire in 1878. Britain promised to use Cyprus as a base to protect the Ottoman Empire from Russia, according to the secret Cyprus Convention agreement. Instead of using the Army, the British set up a semi-military group called the Cyprus Military Police. Disraeli, leader of the Conservative party, was promoting British imperialism and expanding the British Empire. William Ewart Gladstone, leader of the opposition Liberal party, vehemently opposed the takeover as immoral, but he did not return the island.

The island served Britain as a key military base protecting the Suez Canal and especially the sea route to British India, which was then Britain's most important overseas possession. In 1906, a new harbour at Famagusta was completed, increasing the importance of Cyprus as a strategic naval outpost protecting the approaches to the Suez Canal. In 1914 in the First World War the Ottoman Empire and Britain went to war. On 5 November 1914 Britain annexed Cyprus, bringing an end to the convention.

Cyprus gained its independence from the United Kingdom in 1960, after 82 years of British control. The UK was also a signatory to a treaty with Greece and Turkey concerning the independence of Cyprus, the Treaty of Guarantee, which maintains that Britain is a "guarantor power" of the island's independence.

For four years after Cypriot independence, the UK Government supported the Republic of Cyprus financially, under the 1960 Exchange of Notes on Financial Assistance to the Republic of Cyprus. Among other items, that Exchange of Notes provided for payment of a total of £12,000,000 "by way of grant" (and not related to the bases), starting with £4,000,000 in 1961 and tapering down to £1,500,000 in March 1965, with provision for the UK Government to review the situation for each subsequent five-year period, in consultation with the Republic government, and "determine the amount of financial aid to be provided". After the intercommunal conflict of 1963–64 it stopped, claiming there was no guarantee that both communities would benefit equally from that money. The Cypriot government is still claiming money for the years from 1964 to now although to date has taken no international legal action to test the validity of its claim. Estimates for the claimed debt range from several hundred thousand to over €1,000,000,000..

In December 2024, Britain agreed to share intelligence with Cyprus to help prevent Russia from evading sanctions, following talks between Prime Minister Keir Starmer and President Nikos Christodoulides. This was the first visit by a UK prime minister to Cyprus in 53 years. The agreement involved British sanctions offices sharing information with Cyprus' Ministry of Finance to disrupt illicit financial flows and strengthen sanctions enforcement. The new unit in Cyprus will focus on tracking funds linked to sanctions evasion.

== Modern relations ==
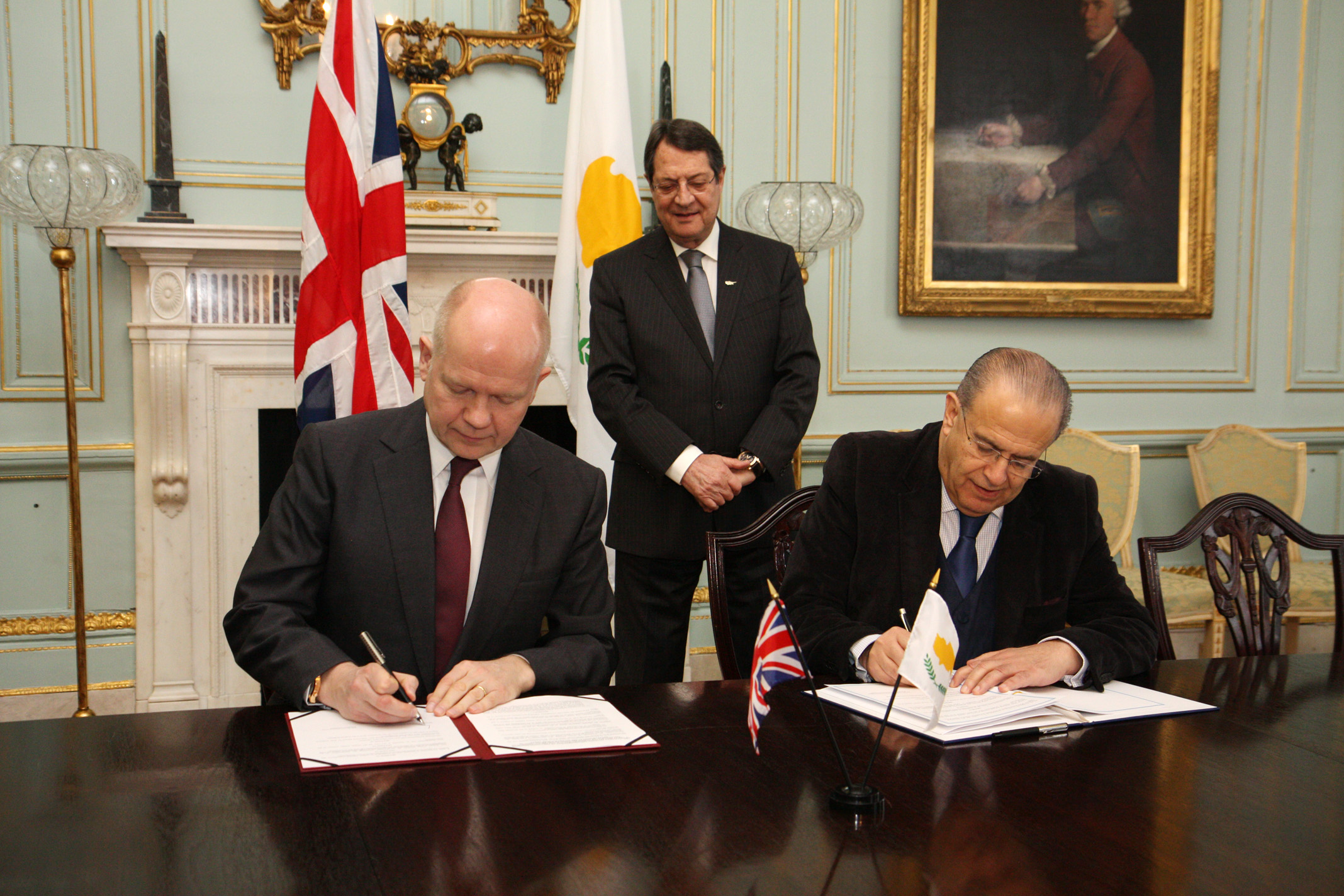
Arrangement on non-military development in the SBAs signed by British Foreign Secretary William Hague and Cypriot Foreign Minister Ioannis Kasoulidis in London, January 2014

The two countries share membership of the Commonwealth of Nations. At the moment, according to a 2011 estimate by Yiannis Papadakis, there are an estimated 270,000 Greek-Cypriots living in the UK. Furthermore, a 2011 report by the Home Affairs Committee states that there are 300,000 Turkish-Cypriots living in the UK. There are at least 50,000 Brits who reside in Cyprus, with most having their property in Paphos district. Current relations between Cyprus and the United Kingdom are considered excellent with high levels of cooperation on energy, diplomacy and education. On 16 January 2014 President of Cyprus Nicos Anastasiades and British Prime Minister David Cameron reaffirmed the strong bonds of friendship and partnership between Cyprus and the UK, during a meeting at 10 Downing Street.

=== Akrotiri and Dhekelia ===
The continuing British sovereignty of the Akrotiri and Dhekelia Sovereign Base Areas has continued to divide Cypriots. Several Cypriot villages remain enclaved in the areas, and there have been numerous arrests of anti-British demonstrators over the past few years. These activists assert that the UK should not continue to hold territory in an EU state.

In January 2014, an agreement signed by Cypriot Foreign Minister Ioannis Kasoulides and Foreign Secretary William Hague, in the presence of President Nicos Anastasiades, was made to lift the restrictions in developing properties within the British bases areas. The right of the owners to develop their land concerns 15 local administrative units, which make up 78% of the total area of the bases. The agreement lifted all restrictions about eligibility and the development of properties within the British Bases so that all regulations applied in the Republic of Cyprus will be valid within the Bases areas, as regards purchasing and developing properties by European or third country nationals.

Following the 2 March 2026 drone attack on Akrotiri air base during the 2026 Iran war, and its dissatisfaction from the British response, Cyprus stated it will consider changing the current agreement. On 3 March, Britain said it was sending to Cyprus the destroyer HMS Dragon and helicopters with counter-drone tech. On 5 March 2026, Britain stated its defence secretary, John Healey, will visit Cyprus after the fallout between the two countries. Though the UK initially rejected any negotiations regarding the change to the status quo of the bases, in October 2026, the first Structured Dialogue took place between the Republic of Cyprus and the United Kingdom regarding the operations of the bases, being confirmed by both the UK High Commission in Nicosia and the Cyprus Ministry of Foreign Affairs.

== Economic relations ==
From 1 June 1973 until 1 May 2004, trade between Cyprus and the UK was governed by the Cyprus–European Communities Association Agreement, and then the Cyprus–European Union Association Agreement, while the United Kingdom was a member of the European Economic Community and the European Union. Upon Cyprus's accession to the European Union, trade between Cyprus and the UK was governed through the European single market.

Following the withdrawal of the United Kingdom from the European Union, the EU and the UK signed a free trade agreement on 31 December 2020, due to the UK leaving the European single market; the EU–UK Trade and Cooperation Agreement entered into force on 1 January 2021. Trade value between the European Union and the United Kingdom was worth £823,100 million in 2023.

== Legal system relations ==
Cyprus has a unique legal system, which is a blend of British common law and Greek-Cypriot civil law. As a former British colony, many of its laws are influenced by British legislation, making it more familiar to those from the UK and other common law jurisdictions.

== Diplomacy ==
Cyprus

- London (High Commission)

United Kingdom

- Nicosia (High Commission)

== See also ==
- Foreign relations of Cyprus
- Foreign relations of the United Kingdom
- United Kingdom–European Union relations
- List of British people of Cypriot descent
