= Erkan Oterkus =

Turkish mechanical engineer and academic

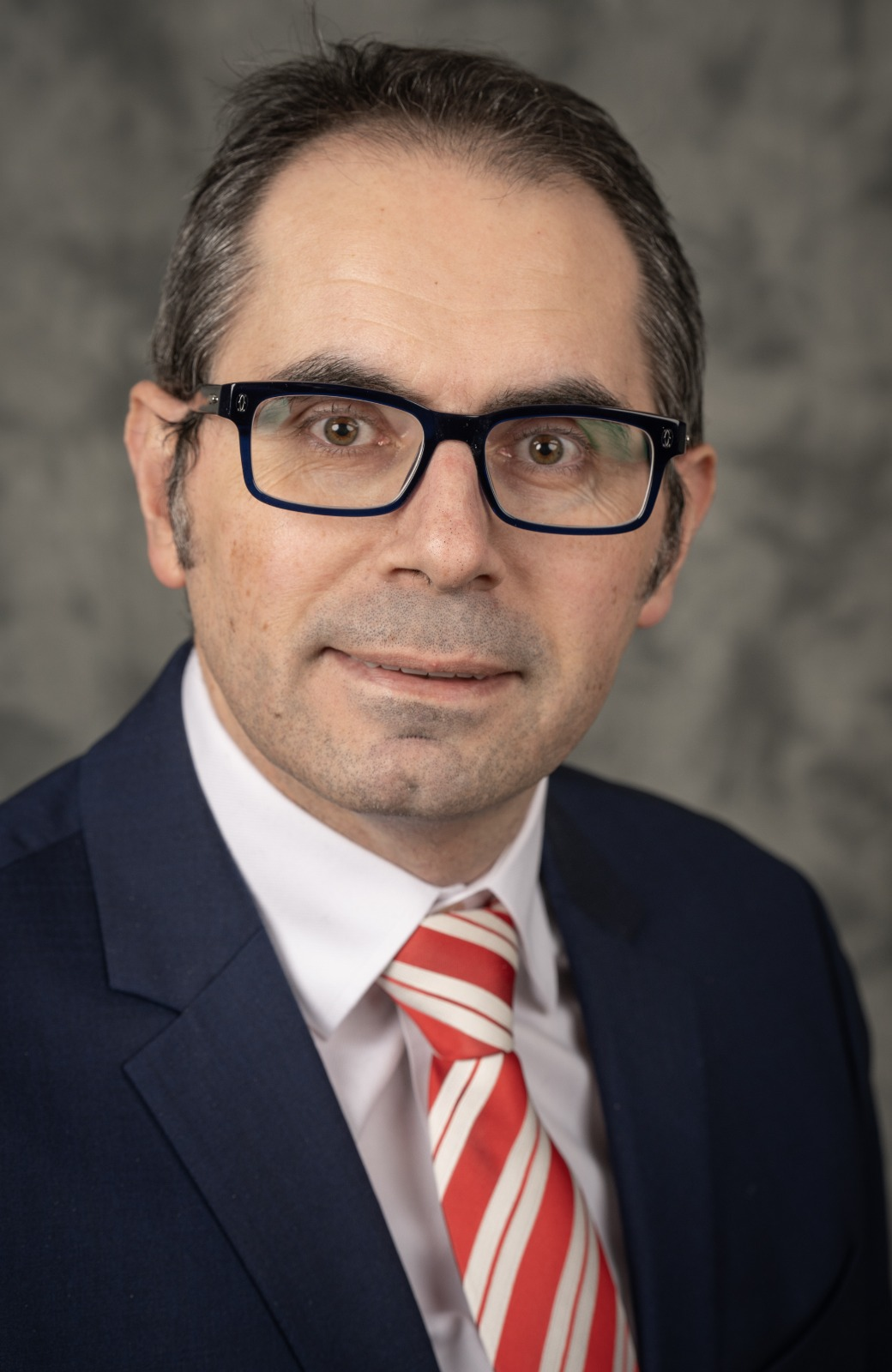
- Prof. Erkan Oterkus
- Born: April 1979 (age 47)
- Education: Dokuz Eylül University (BS); İzmir Institute of Technology (MS); University of Arizona (PhD)
- Known for: Peridynamics
- Awards: ASME Associate Editor of the Year (2024); Fellow of the American Society of Mechanical Engineers (2026)
- Scientific career
- Fields: Mechanical engineering Computational mechanics
- Workplaces: Stony Brook University; University of Strathclyde; NASA Langley Research Center
- Thesis: Peridynamic Theory for Modelling Three-Dimensional Damage Growth in Metallic and Composite Structures (2010)
- Doctoral advisor: Erdogan Madenci
- Website: www.stonybrook.edu/civileng/faculty/core-faculty-profiles/oterkus.html

Erkan Oterkus (born April 1979) is a Turkish-British mechanical engineer and a SUNY Empire Innovation Associate Professor in the Department of Civil Engineering at Stony Brook University. His research focuses on structural health monitoring and digital twin systems incorporating peridynamics, the inverse finite element method (iFEM), and artificial intelligence/machine learning.

== Education ==
Oterkus received his Bachelor of Science degree in mechanical engineering from Dokuz Eylül University, Turkey, in 2001, and his Master of Science degree in mechanical engineering from the İzmir Institute of Technology in 2002. He completed his PhD in aerospace engineering at the University of Arizona in 2010 under the supervision of Erdogan Madenci, with a dissertation titled "Peridynamic Theory for Modelling Three-Dimensional Damage Growth in Metallic and Composite Structures".

== Career ==
Following his doctoral studies, Oterkus worked as a postdoctoral researcher at NASA Langley Research Centre in 2011. He joined the University of Strathclyde as an assistant professor in 2012, became an associate professor in 2016, and was promoted to professor in 2019.

Oterkus established the PeriDynamics Research Centre (PDRC) in 2019. He also served as director of the Ocean Energy Research Unit (OERU) at Strathclyde from 2022 to 2025. In 2026, he joined Stony Brook University as a SUNY Empire Innovation Associate Professor in the Department of Civil Engineering. He has held visiting positions at Stanford University, Otto von Guericke University Magdeburg, Nihon University, and the University of Padua.

== Awards ==
In 2024, he received the ASME Associate Editor of the Year award for his service to the Journal of Engineering Materials and Technology.

In 2026, Oterkus was elected a Fellow of the American Society of Mechanical Engineers. He is a Fellow and Council Member of the Institution of Engineers in Scotland, where he has served as a director since February 2023.

== Research ==
Oterkus's research focuses on peridynamics, a nonlocal reformulation of continuum mechanics originally proposed by Stewart Silling at Sandia National Laboratories, which uses integral equations rather than partial differential equations, making it particularly suited to modelling crack propagation and material failure.

In 2014, Oterkus co-authored Peridynamic Theory and Its Applications with Erdogan Madenci, published by Springer and described as the first book on peridynamics. In 2021, he co-edited Peridynamic Modeling, Numerical Techniques, and Applications with Selda Oterkus and Erdogan Madenci, published by Elsevier. In 2019, he co-authored a review of peridynamics in Mathematics and Mechanics of Solids.

Oterkus has worked on the development of digital twin systems for structural health monitoring, applied to areas including ships, offshore wind turbines, and aerospace structures for both commercial and defence applications.

Using the inverse finite element method (iFEM), Oterkus and his collaborators have developed digital twin models for various ship types, including container ships, bulk carriers, and tankers, as well as offshore wind turbines. He has also developed peridynamic models to analyse hydrogen embrittlement, stress corrosion cracking, pitting corrosion, and pit-to-crack transition in maritime applications.

During his time at the University of Arizona and NASA Langley Research Centre, Oterkus carried out research on aerospace structures, working on bolted and bonded joint analysis of composite structures, buckling of composite structures, and modelling damage growth in metallic and composite structures With his collaborators, he has also developed digital twin models for aerospace structures based on the iFEM methodology.

== Editorial positions ==
Oterkus serves as Editor-in-Chief of Sustainable Marine Structures. He is an associate editor of the Journal of Peridynamics and Nonlocal Modeling (Springer), the ASME Journal of Engineering Materials and Technology, and Frontiers in Materials. He serves on the editorial boards of the International Journal of Naval Architecture and Ocean Engineering, Marine Structures, Engineering Fracture Mechanics, and the Journal of Energy and Sustainability.
