= Ziya Meral =

Ziya Meral is a UK based Turkish-British academic and advisor. He specialises on global trends shaping defence and security, politics and foreign policies of Turkey and the Middle East, religion and violent conflict issues. He is a Lecturer in International Studies and Diplomacy at the School of Oriental and Asian Studies, University of London. He is also a Senior Associate Fellow senior associate fellow at the Royal United Services Institute, a Visiting Fellow of the Royal Navy's Strategic Studies Centre, and a Senior Associate Fellow of the European Leadership Network. He is the co-founder and Senior Associate of the Climate Change and (In)Security project, a joint initiative of the UK Army and University of Oxford and was a Council Member of the British Institute at Ankara. From 2015-2023, he was based at the UK Army's Centre for Historical Analysis and Conflict Research at the Royal Military Academy Sandhurst, where he led a large programme on global trends impacting UK defense, which commissioned and hosted more than 140 academics and experts at events for more than 9,000 UK defence personnel. Dr Ziya Meral continues to lecture on international security trends at the UK Army's Junior Officers Tactical Awareness Course. He was the founding director of the Centre on Religion and Global Affairs- a London, Accra and Beirut based initiative exploring impact of religions on global developments. He regularly gives talks, lectures and expert statements at leading academic, political, military and diplomatic institutions and conferences, including the UK House of Commons and House of Lords, the U.S. Congress, US State Department, NATO Defence College, EU Commission, UK FCDO and MoD and US Military Academy West Point. During 2010–2011, he was a Joseph Crapa Fellow at the US Commission on International Religious Freedom (USCIRF)- a federal body that produces policy proposals for the US government, researching on prevention of ethno-religious violence.

== Education ==
He holds a 1st Class BA Hons from Brunel University in London, M.Div. from International School of Theology in the Philippines, MSc in sociology from the London School of Economics and a Ph.D. in political science at the University of Cambridge.

== Media ==
He is a frequent commentator in international and British media, including live interviews on Al Jazeera, BBC News, BBC World, France 24 and BBC Radio's the Today Programme. He has been cited by various British and international newspapers on developments in Turkey and Middle East, including the New York Times, the Financial Times, the Atlantic, the Sunday Times, the Daily Telegraph, the CNN, the National Geographic, the Times.
