= Necati Zontul =

Turkish national

Necati Zontul at Westminster

Necati Zontul is a Turkish-British national who was tortured and raped in Greece by Greek officers in the summer of 2001. The assault was initially denied by the Coast Guard, the Ministry of Merchant Marine and then dismissed as a one-off incident by the police.

On 14 August 2001 the Head of Internal Affairs, Vassilis Tsiatouras, dismissed the incident in Chania as a one-off aberration. Any abuse resulted from "heavy work load that the master of the Heraklion harbor, captain Markos Koutsourakis, who oversees the EDE, had." The Chief of the Coast Guard, Andreas Syrigos, says that "based on information received from the person who carries out the EDE, the immigrants were injured while they were either having an argument or attempting to escape" In contrast a UNHCR official told reporters: "One does not have to be a doctor to see that these people were beaten."

After international pressure, six men were tried (Flourakis, Lefakis, Moumtzis and Valirakis, Vaddakis and Dandoulakis) and five were found guilty in 2001. Subsequently, three of them were acquitted and the sentences of the other two, Dandoulakis and Vaddakis, who were specifically linked to the allegation of rape, were dramatically reduced to fines. It is understood that they remain in uniform, but the Greek Government has persistently refused to deny or admit this. The Athens News reported the 2004 case in sensational terms:

"This is the first time officers in Greece are charged with torture and abuse of authority based on article 137A of the Greek criminal code. If convicted, they face from three years up to life in prison.

More than 100 asylum seekers reported having suffered beatings and other inhuman and degrading treatment at a makeshift detention center in Hania, Crete in May 2001. They were part of a group of 119 men, 20 women, and 25 children from Iraq, Iran, Ethiopia, Afghanistan and Pakistan."

They also provided a list of victims who were hospitalised or seriously traumatised:

- Necati Zontul, 36: beaten and raped by a Coast Guard officer.
- Erdal Akgün, age 17: extensive inflammation on the right side of his chest.
- Özhan Eşik, age 17: swelling of his right elbow
- Hanefi Altın, age 36: large bruise across his chest.
- Bülent Şahin, age 27: complains of acute deafness in his right ear.
- Halil Gilgil, age 20: severe abdominal pain
- Ferhat Demir, age 18, large haematoma [large swelling of clotted blood] in the back of his left thigh.
- Cihat Koral, age 26, complains of head injury and has two bruises [one 10 cm long and the other 40 cm long]
- Halot Bağış, age 29, bruise on the right abdomen and two bruises around his armpits.
- Mehmet Nuri Aktay, age 29: complains of pain when moving his left arm and has bruises on the left side of his back.
- Rahmi Tunç, age 29, four bruises on his back.

Since the publication of this summary, further evidence has surfaced of other victims, who for one reason or another failed to testify. Specifically, another (Kurd) victim called Yussef, who alleges rape and talks of Russian roulette and mock executions.

Zontul's original evidence given to translator Lisa Turkuman was seriously condensed and essentially faulty. On the basis of this and an interview with the Greek Helsinki Monitor in October 2001, Amnesty recorded in its report of 2002 that Zontul "changed his evidence". He insists he did no such thing, and indeed at the trial in 2004, the commander of the unit testified against his own men and seems to corroborate Zontul's story. Recently, Amnesty International Secretariat admitted, that the staff at the Athens Office had resigned and that they had perhaps relied too much on information about the case that had come from only one source. Indeed, from the first television interview to Tempo TV he gave in October 2001, when footage was intercut with scenes from Basic Instinct, there seems to have been an effort to discredit Zontul. When Christodoulos, the Archbishop of Athens, was approached for help in 2003, he went on national television that evening to say "All Turks are barbarians." Christodoulos has never publicly condemned the rise in racist agitation and its apparent links with the Greek Orthodox Church.

The MEP Bill Miller wrote to the Ministry of Justice a few times and received no reply in over three years. The Greek Embassy in London denied that any court case was taking place in 2004 and in 2006, a court official in the Military Appellate Court in Athens told Zontul that his assailant, Dandoulakis, was "really a good boy" and that Zontul was not among witnesses being called to testify. Despite apparent bias, however, the guilty verdict was upheld.

Nevertheless, the Greek Government has failed to apologise, accept responsibility for the actions of its armed and uniformed security personnel, issue a statement of non-recurrence or offer compensation. The Greek Ombudsman has written to and repeatedly discussed (in 2007) with the Greek Government, suggesting that an apology and a statement of sympathy would be in order. The Government has never responded. Further instances of torture and abuse by the Greek Coast Guard have been recorded, and some are recorded on YouTube.

The Greek Government, in response to a request from the British Foreign Office in 2006-2007, issued a range of four conflicting dates for the cessation of national remedies.

Together with his partner, Tim Wilson, Zontul has campaigned against his assailants and has made a film of his experiences. It mixes animation and live action footage. The film, A Torture Cartoon, was sponsored by Screen South and the RIFE lottery project.

The case came before the European Court of Human Rights. The treatment of foreign detainees and refugees in Greece has not greatly improved - to such an extent that the British Government has recently decided not to send refugees / asylum seekers who make their way to the UK back to Greece.

In 2012, Zontul's case was successful. The torture was admitted and modest compensation arranged. This was organised by the British charity REDRESS. Further violence to foreigners has continued in Greece, and has involved the detention and abuse of foreign tourists.
