= Semra Eren-Nijhar =

Turkish writer

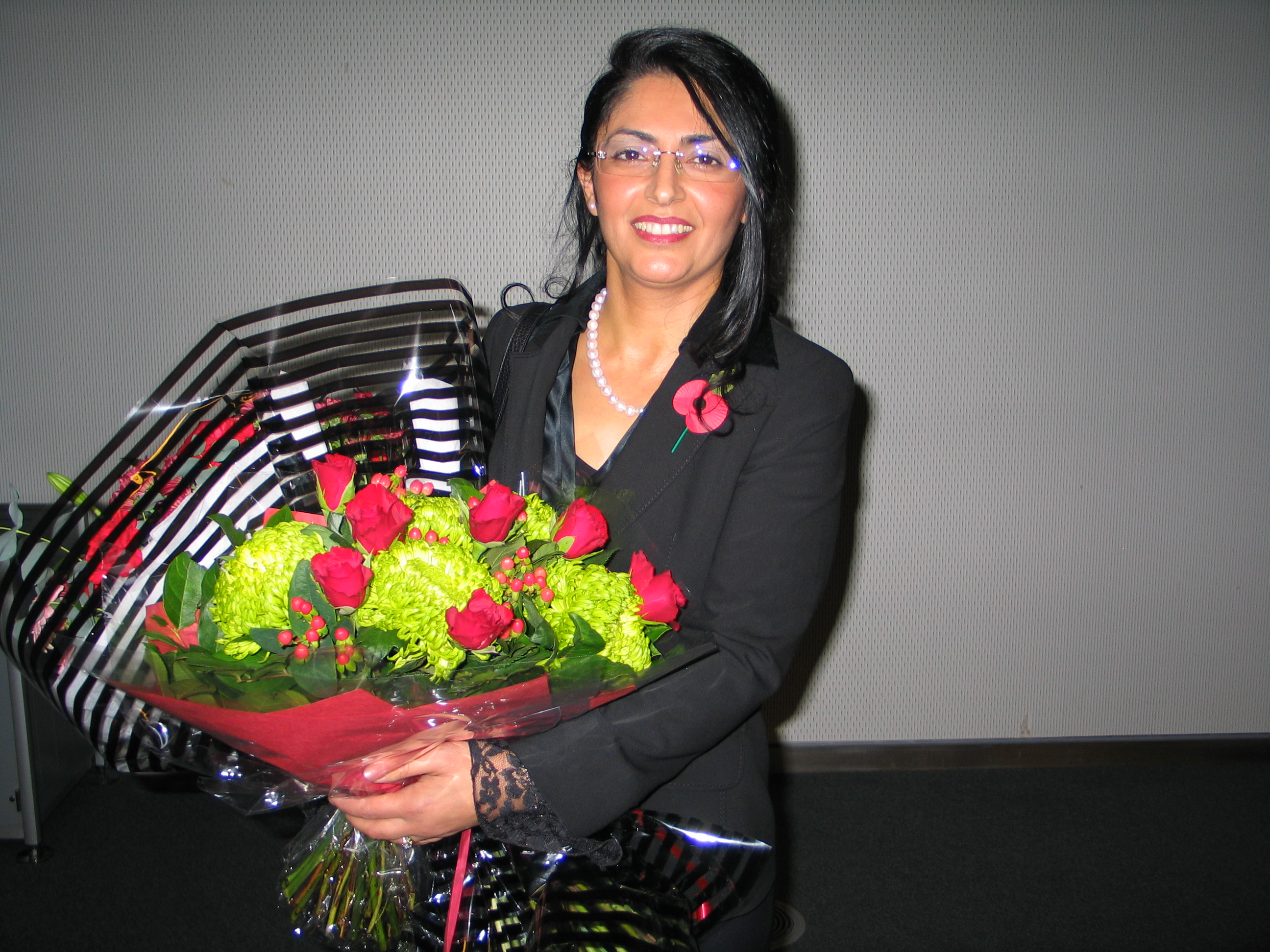
- Born: April 6, 1967 (age 59); Istanbul, Turkey
- Occupations: Author; sociologist; poet; documentary filmmaker; social commentator
- Writing career
- Language: English; German; Turkish
- Website: erennijhar.com

Semra Eren-Nijhar (born April 6, 1967, in Istanbul) is a Turkish writer, sociologist, documentary filmmaker and a social commentator.

== Biography ==
Eren-Nijhar is an expert in the area of social policy across Europe and Turkey mostly focusing on issues of migration, memory, belonging, heritage, women, youth, race, identity, and the Turkish diaspora and Turkish Heritage in the EU.

She is the founder of the ‘Turkish Heritage in the UK’ initiative, co-founded with Councillor Ahmet Karahasan of the "Turkish Heritage Day in London" – launched on December 8, 2014, at Enfield Council. She is also the founder of "Turkish Heritage in Europe" which was launched at the International Bosphorus Summit on November 29, 2019, in Istanbul.

For more than fifteen years Eren-Nijhar researched the archives of the Cyprus Turkish Association CTA (first Turkish association in Britain) and is the first and only researcher who introduced some selected documents, photos, and publications of the archives to the wider public.

Her work London Turks – In Their Own Words which chronicles the Turkish community over the last eighty years with photographs, interviews, and portraits in the UK was the first major work on the Turkish diaspora in Britain and was exhibited and acknowledged by the Greater London Authority, Mayor of London in 2006 and later in 2007 at the European Parliament acknowledged and hosted by MEP's Claude Moraes, Cem Özdemir, Emine Bozkurt and Vural Öger with the attendance of the Ambassador Volkan Bozkır, the Permanent Representative of Turkey to the European Union.

She is an expert on the twice Nobel Prize nominee Turkish Cypriot poet Osman Türkay and has enabled his work to come to life once again in Europe and in Turkey. Eren-Nijhar worked for several years in the House of Lords as an adviser to a peer, Lord Tarsem King, Baron King of West Bromwich. The documentary "Söz Bizde – We Have the Voice", co-produced and directed with Ersin Atlı in 2010 was shown by Turkey's national broadcaster TRT and was the first documentary giving a voice to young people living in Britain and in Europe with Turkish and Kurdish background. Eren-Nijhar uses creative techniques from the world of arts by drawing in people's interest in her sociological research outcomes and findings. She has exhibited her photographic exhibitions in Britain, Belgium, and Turkey. Her work mainly focuses on portraits of individuals.

Eren-Nijhar's photographic exhibition “My Journey from Güvercinlik (Pigeon-loft)” was invited in 2017 to exhibit at the Victoria and Albert Museum (V&A) during the marking of the British Turkish Cypriot community 100 years of migration to the United Kingdom. It was the first major photographic exhibition held at the Victoria and Albert Museum featuring the Turkish Cypriot community in Britain.

== Awards ==
- 2004 –Millennium Awards Fellowship, Lifetime Membership for her personal commitment and achievement enriching the community throughout the United Kingdom.
- 2015 – International European Quality Award, Innovation and Awareness Award for her outstanding achievement in her work.
- 2018 – Achievement Award for her outstanding achievement in her work.
- 2024 – Recognition certificate from the President of Turkish Republic of Northern Cyprus Ersin Tatar for her contribution to the work on Turkish Cypriot poet Osman Türkay.

== Books ==
- Evrenin Şairi Osman Türkay, Cyprus Turkish Association Publications, 2011
- Avrupa’nın İlk Türk Derneği – Kıbrıs Türk Cemiyeti, Cyprus Turkish Association Publications, 2012
- Kıpırtı Yazıları, Yar Publishing, 2013
- Artık Gurbet Yok! (Mu?) I – There Is No More a Place far from Home! (Is There?), Ozan Publication, 2014
- Turkish Heritage in the UK, SUNCUT Publishing, 2014
- Londra’da Çok Kültürlülük – Yaşamdan Portreler, Ozan Publication, 2015
- Artık Gurbet Yok! ( Mu?) II – Das Gefühl in der Fremde zu sein gibt es nicht mehr! (Oder?), Ozan Publication, 2016
- Turks in London-The Unheard Voices, Ozan Publication, 2017
- Kadınlardan Dünyayı Değiştiren Sözler, Ozan Publication, 2018
- Londra mı Dediniz? Buyrun..., Ozan Publication, 2019
- Osman Turkay
- Anlat Patara – Tell Me Patara: Poetry, Ozan Publication, 2021
- Tağı Bey, on the folk song ‘Hoş Gelişler Ola, Mustafa Kemal Paşa’ Ozan Publication, 2022
- Millennium Poet Osman Türkay, Ozan Publication, 2023
- Uzay’ın Şairi Osman Türkay, Ozan Publication, 2023.
