= Rena Kirdar =

Iraqi socialite

- Born: 1969 (age 56–57); Baghdad, Iraq
- Occupations: Socialite, party hostess, writer
- Spouse(s): Sami Sindi (1991–2005); Makram Abboud (2012–present)

Rena Kirdar (born 1969) is an Iraqi socialite.

== Biography ==
Kirdar was born in Baghdad, June 1968. She spent part of her childhood in the Middle East. Her father, Iraqi billionaire Nemir A. Kirdar, founded the merchant bank Investcorp in the 1980s, which later acquired Gucci, Tiffany & Co. and Saks Fifth Avenue.

Kirdar completed an undergraduate degree in Philosophy, Politics and Economics at the University of Oxford, later earning a master's degree in international affairs from Columbia University and an MBA from Cambridge Judge Business School. She moved from London to New York City in 1991, and purchased Sean Combs' townhouse on Park Avenue.

As a member of the Manhattan social scene, Kirdar threw "some of the most lavish and unforgettable costume parties" of the 1990s, including Sloan-Kettering's Valentine's Day Ball, New York City Ballet's Dance with the Dancers Gala, and events for the Boys' Club of New York, Saks Fifth Avenue, and Bruno Magli. In 2002, she published Be My Guest, a detailed photographic diary of her most successful themed events, with tips on invitations, table settings, recipes, cocktails, decorations, and music.

== Personal life ==
Rena married Saudi businessman Sami Sindi in 1991, and they had two daughters. They divorced in 2005 and Kirdar moved back to London. She married Lebanese financier Makram Abboud in London in June 2012.

== Bibliography ==
- Be My Guest: Theme Party Savoir-Faire (2002)
