= Nemir Kirdar =

Iraqi businessman (1936–2020)

- Born: 28 October 1936; Kirkuk, Iraq
- Died: 8 June 2020 (aged 83); Cap d'Antibes, France
- Education: University of the Pacific (BSc Economics); Fordham University (MBA)
- Known for: Founder, CEO and chairman of Investcorp
- Children: Rena Kirdar Sindi; Serra Kirdar

Nemir Amin Kirdar (Arabic: نمير قيردار) (28 October 1936 – 8 June 2020) was an Iraqi banker, billionaire, businessman, financier and author. As a founding father of private equity, and an economic and cultural bridge-builder, he was the founder and CEO of Investcorp, a global alternative investment group that operates in Manama, New York, London, Abu Dhabi, Riyadh, Doha, and Singapore. He spent much of his life in London, and held British citizenship.

== Early life ==
Kirdar was born in Kirkuk, Iraq, to the influential Turkmen Kirdar (Kırdar) family of Kirkuk. The Kirdar family were prominent in the politics of the late Ottoman Empire, early Turkish Republic and interwar Iraq. Members of his family included Mehmet Lütfi Kırdar, former governor and mayor of Istanbul.

He completed his primary education at Baghdad's Saadoun School, his secondary education at the Jesuit-run Baghdad College, and his initial university education at Robert College in Istanbul, initially studying engineering then switching to economics and liberal arts. He envisioned to pursue a political career in his native Iraq, but after a military coup overthrew the Iraqi monarchy in 1958, Kirdar left Iraq to the United States where his cousins lived. Having only completed three out of four years at Robert College, he had to find a new university that would accept him into the final year for an economics degree.

== Career ==
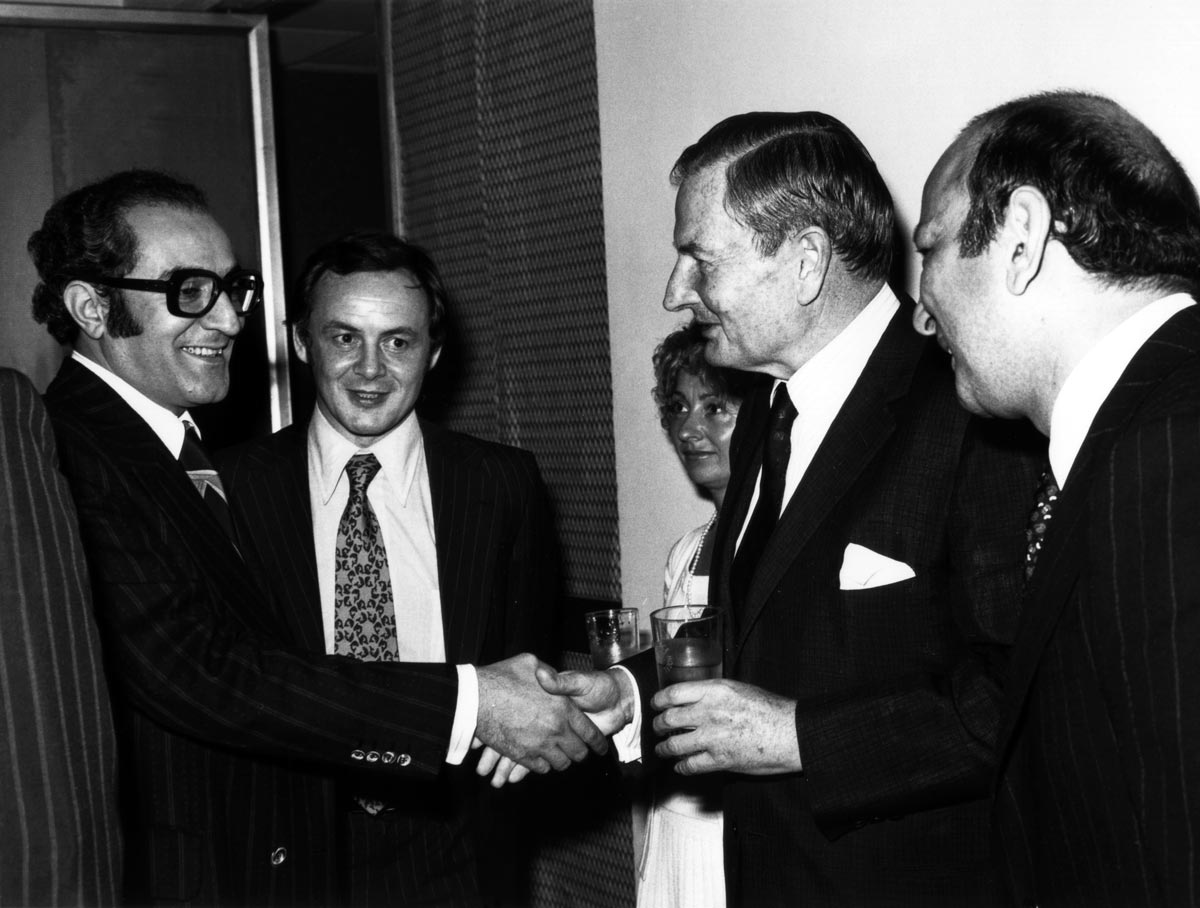
Nemir Kirdar meets David Rockefeller during a visit to Bahrain and Abu Dhabi, 1976

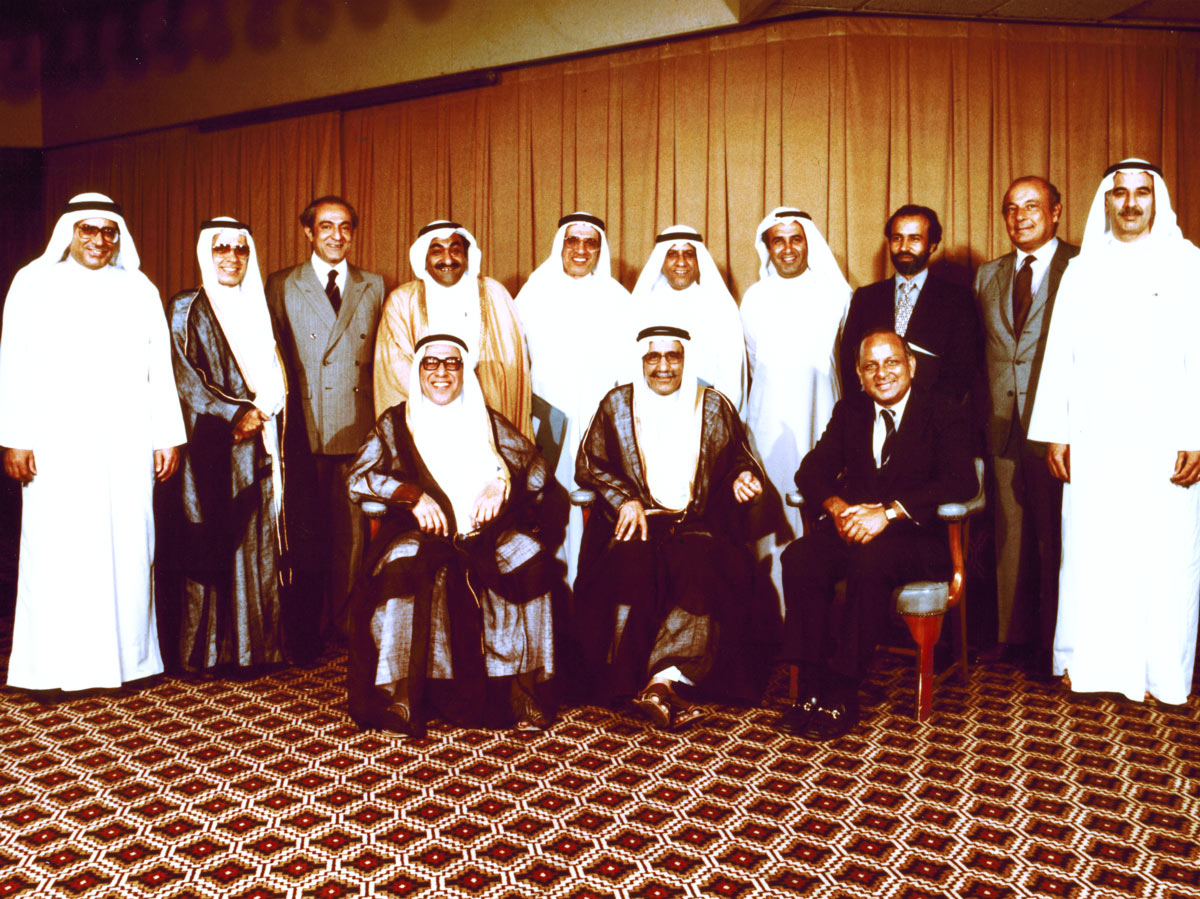
Kirdar with Investcorp's first board of directors in 1982, shortly after the firm's founding

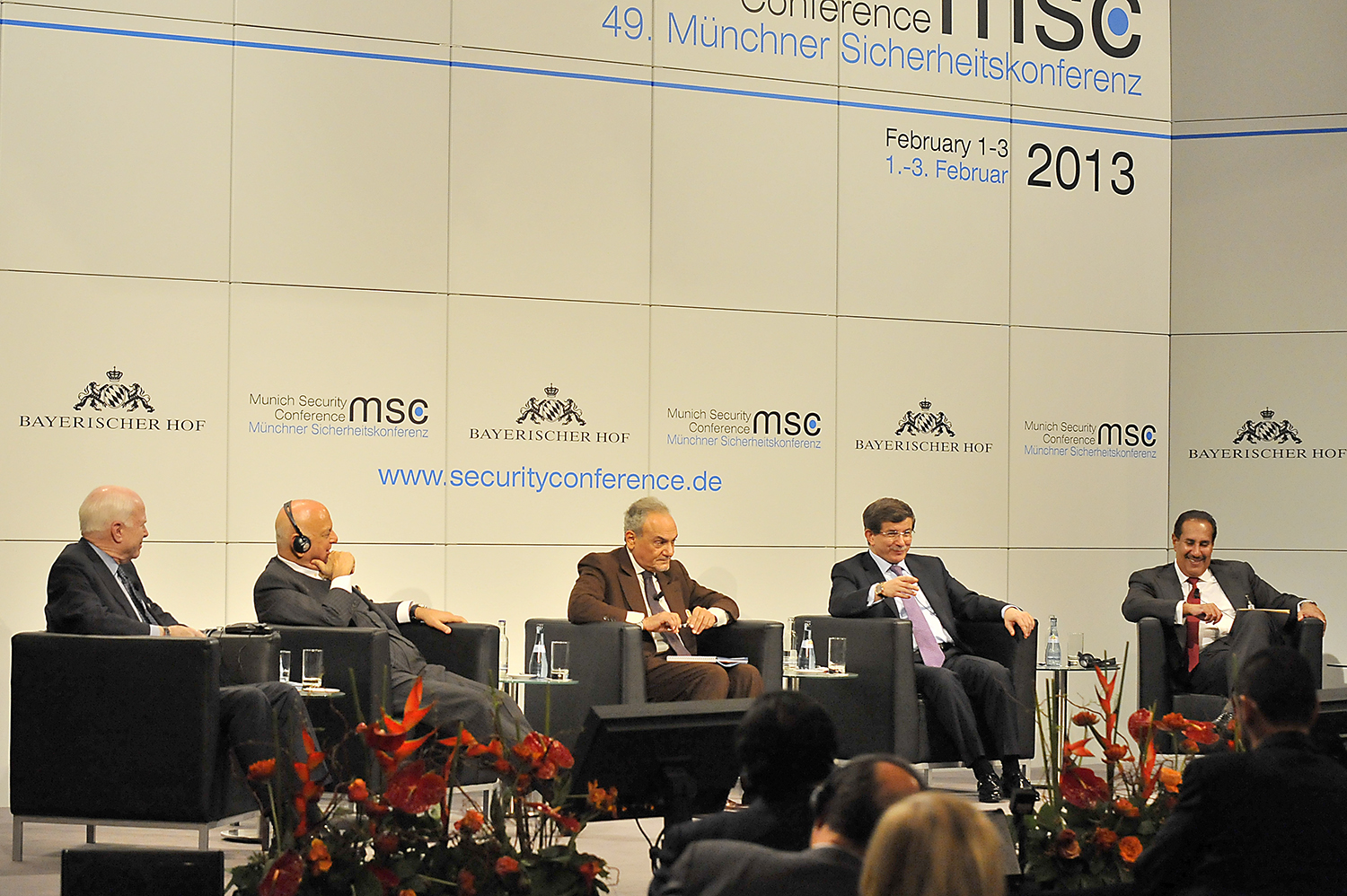
Kirdar at the 49th Munich Security Conference, 2013

Kirdar graduated from the University of the Pacific in California in 1960, with a bachelor's degree in economics. He then moved to Phoenix, Arizona where he began his career in the financial world as a teller for the First National Bank of Arizona. Two years later he returned to Iraq, where he started and sold several businesses. In 1969, he was wrongfully jailed after a misunderstanding over his involvement with a U.S. company he represented, and left Iraq permanently, returning to the United States. After settling in New York, Kirdar returned to the banking industry and earned an MBA at Fordham University's night school. He then worked in South East Asia and Japan for Allied Bank International. In 1974, he joined Chase Manhattan Bank in New York as vice president. Between 1976 and 1981, Kirdar worked in the Middle East, overseeing and directing Chase's banking network in the region.

Having worked in the Middle East and seeing the potential for growth in the region, in 1982, he founded Investcorp, a firm specializing in global alternative investments including private equity, hedge funds, real estate, technology investments and capital growth in the GCC region. The firm connected investors in the Gulf to investment opportunities in the West. Kirdar was CEO for over 30 years until 2015, becoming chairman, until retiring in 2017.

== Death ==
He died at the age of 83 in 2020.

== Wealth ==
Kirdar was estimated to have a net worth of over US$1 billion. Kirdar ranked 206 in the British Rich List 2005. He also ranked No. 26 on the world's most influential Arabs 2009 list.

== Academic awards ==
Kirdar received honorary doctorates from Fordham University of New York, Georgetown University in Washington DC; the University of the Pacific, California; and Richmond, The American International University in London.

Kirdar was an honorary fellow of St Antony's College, Oxford; member of the United Nations Investments Committee, NYC; member of the board of trustees, Brookings Institution, Washington DC; member of the board of trustees, Eisenhower Exchange Fellowship, Philadelphia, PA; member of the advisory board, School of International & Public Affairs, Columbia University, NYC; founding member of the International Business Council, World Economic Forum, Geneva; member of the Chatham House panel of senior advisers, UK; member of the international council of the Belfer Center for Science and International Affairs, John F. Kennedy School of Government, Harvard University; member of the Council for Arab & International Relations, Kuwait; member of the board of trustees, Silatech, Doha, Qatar

== Books ==
- Saving Iraq (2009)
- In Pursuit of Fulfilment (2012)
- Need, Respect, Trust: The Memoir of a Vision (2013)

== In film, television and theatre ==
Youssef Kerkour portrayed Kirdar in the 2021 film House of Gucci.
