= Babutsa =

- Origin: London, United Kingdom
- Genres: Pop, folk
- Occupations: Singers, songwriters
- Years active: 2009–present
- Labels: 4 MART MÜZİK
- Members: Peri Aziz; Ali Sönmez; Soner Türsoy

Babutsa is a British–Turkish Cypriot music band. The group is named after Opuntias which is a fruit particular to Cyprus. The band was formed of three soloists whose members include Peri Aziz, Ali Sönmez, and Soner Türsoy. Babutsa sings popular traditional Turkish Cypriot folklore songs. They have managed to grab the attention of not only Cypriots around the world, but also of many people in Turkey who are often foreign to Cypriot music. Thus, they have gained much success in Cyprus, the UK, Australia, and Turkey especially with their first single Yanayım Yanayım.

== Members ==
Ali Sönmez (born in 1962, London, England) is of Turkish Cypriot descent.

Soner Türsoy (born in 1965, Famagusta, Cyprus) immigrated to London in 1981.

== Discography ==
Yanayım Yanayım

Güzelim

=== Albums ===
- London Calling (2009)

=== Singles ===
- Yanayım Yanayım (2009)
- Tabi Güzelim (2010)
