= Mustafa Hulusi =

Mustafa Hulusi (born in 1971, London, United Kingdom) is a British artist. His work is diverse and includes fields such as painting, videos, installation and photography.

== Biography ==
Hulusi was born in London to a Turkish Cypriot family. After graduating from Fine Art and Critical Studies at Goldsmiths College, Hulusi continued towards his master's degree at the Royal College of Art. He had his first group exhibition in 2004 called "New Contemporaries 04" and his first solo exhibition in 2005, called "The end of the West" at the Max Wigram Gallery. In 2007, Hulusi represented Cyprus at the 52nd International Exhibition of Contemporary Art of La Biennale di Venezia and had solo exhibitions at A-Foundation, Liverpool, and Max Wigram Gallery. More recently, in 2009, he has also exhibited his solo shows at Patrick Painter in Los Angeles and THE PAGE GALLERY in Seoul in 2015.
