= Tash (singer) =

British-Turkish Cypriot singer

- Born: Sertac Nidai; London, United Kingdom
- Genres: R&B, pop, Middle Eastern influences (Turkish/Arabic)
- Occupation: Singer
- Instrument: Vocals
- Years active: 2012–present
- Labels: Sony Music (Middle East)

Tash (born Sertac Nidai) is a British-Turkish Cypriot singer whose music is an "East-meets-West" fusion of R&B and Middle Eastern influences. He is the first artist signed to the Sony Music Middle East on a full record deal. Tash released his debut album, "In The Deep", in 2012 with his lead single "Habibi Leh"; the album heavily trades on Tash's Turkish Cypriot roots.

== Biography ==
Tash was born Sertac Nidai (Turkish: Sertaç Nidai) in London, the United Kingdom, to Turkish Cypriot parents. His parents introduced him to different kinds of music at a very young age when they would bring home CDs from their travels. One of his earliest memories, at age five, is around owning a mini snooker table where instead of playing, he would grab the sticks and make rhythmic beats on the cushions. Tash has described himself as "quite academic, I wouldn’t say I was that sporty though. I’d usually be in the music block, especially during subjects I didn’t like!". He began playing the piano at primary school, which is now one of his main instruments, as well as the darbuka. In 2011, during a London video shoot, Tash was introduced to a Sony Music official, he became the first artist signed to the Sony Music Middle East on a full record deal. His debut album, "In The Deep", was released on 12 February 2012.

== Discography ==
=== Albums ===
- In The Deep (2012)

=== Singles ===
- Habibi Leh ft. D.A. (2012)
- Habibi Leh (Losing My Head) ft. D.A. (2012)
