= Hattie Hasan =

Hattie Hasan MBE
- Occupation: Plumber
- Known for: Established the organisation Stopcocks, dedicated to supporting women plumbers

Hatice Hasan MBE, known as Hattie Hasan, is a British plumber and CEO of the Stopcocks Women Plumbers franchise for women in the plumbing trade.

== Career ==
Hasan trained as a plumber after working as a teacher in inner-city schools for eight years. She enrolled in a plumbing course as a self employed apprentice. After practising as a plumber for 15 years she founded Stopcocks as a means of promoting and enabling female plumbers, who make up around 3% of the construction workforce and less than 1% of plumbers. The Stopcocks network was established to provide support to self employed women and training for those getting established in the trade.

Hasan authored The Joy of Plumbing: A Guide to Living the Life You Really, Really Want published in 2011. She was named in the 2020 New Year Honours list as an MBE for supporting and promoting women in the plumbing and heating industries.

== Published works ==
- Hasan, Hattie (2011). The Joy of Plumbing: A Guide to Living the Life You Really, Really Want. Ecademy Press. ISBN 978-1-907722-09-7.

== Personal life ==
Hasan is of Turkish Cypriot origin.
