= Mutlu Çerkez =

- Born: 17 September 1964; London, United Kingdom
- Died: 10 December 2005 (aged 41); Melbourne, Australia
- Known for: Painter

Mutlu Çerkez (17 September 1964 – 10 December 2005) was a British-born Australian-Turkish Cypriot conceptual artist. Çerkez was known for titling his work based upon a future date which he would remake it, although not necessarily in its original form. He represented Australia at the 6th Istanbul Biennial in Turkey in 1999, and São Paulo Biennale in Brazil in 1998.

== Biography ==
Çerkez was born on 17 September 1964 in London, to Turkish Cypriot parents. In 1987, he studied at the Victorian College of the Arts, in Melbourne, Australia and had his first solo exhibitions the next year at the City Gallery in Melbourne and the Australian Centre for Photography in Sydney. Çerkez attracted an international reputation, showing in the United States, Italy and Denmark, as well as at the 1998 São Paulo Biennial and the 1999 Istanbul Biennial. In the same year, he was in the Seppelt Contemporary Art Award. In 2001 his work was included in the exhibition Art > Music at the Museum of Contemporary Art in Sydney, which featured a project referencing Rock band Led Zeppelin, as did another project for the 2004 Auckland Triennial. In 2005, he exhibited at the Art Gallery of New South Wales in an exhibition with fellow Melbourne artist Marco Fusinato. He also featured in the exhibition "Fieldwork Australian Art 1968-2002" with which the National Gallery of Victoria opened its Federation Square galleries. He later died on 10 December 2005.

== Work ==
Çerkez did not always give his works a standard title, but they always received at least one date; however, this date did not relate to the work's fabrication, but was placed in the future. The underlying idea was that on the specified date, Çerkez would remake the work. As Çerkez once remarked to Robyn McKenzie: "I imagined at the end of my life there being two series of works, the originals and the copies, in two different chronological orders. I thought the interesting thing would be the missing ones – the ones dated after I die."

In 2018 Monash University Museum of Art (MUMA), Melbourne presented a retrospective exhibition of all the artists works.
