= Cosh Omar =

British actor and playwright

Coşkun Ömer, more commonly known as Cosh Omar, (born in London, England) is a British actor and playwright of Turkish Cypriot descent. Omar’s most notable plays include The Battle of Green Lanes and The Great Extension which deal with multicultural issues in London with the use of comedy. He has also appeared in several TV episodes including: The Bill, Bleak House, EastEnders and Spooks.
