= Mustafa Aslanturk =

Cypriot fashion designer

Mustafa Aslanturk (born in Cyprus) is a Cypriot fashion designer who currently resides in London, England.

Arslanturk graduated from the London College of Fashion in 2005 and had previously studied Interior Architecture in Cyprus. The architectural influence is very much apparent in his Autumn/Winter 07/08.
