= Mem Morrison =

Mem Morrison, born as Mehmet Muhaurem Ramadan, is a British performance artist. His work draws upon personal complexities by acknowledging cultural differences.

== Biography ==
Morrison was born in south-east London to Turkish Cypriot parents. He changed his name as a young actor whilst seeking work. He has stated that "At that time Muhaurem was the past and Morrison was who I wanted to be...But I feel that I let my community down by changing it, and if I was starting out now as an actor I probably wouldn't change it. There is much more acceptance now."

== Productions ==
- 1997: Push
- 1998: Showroom
- 2000: Lilac
- 2000: Triptych
- 2004: Undo
- 2004: Fuel
- 2007: Tebrik
- 2007: Leftovers
- 2009: Ringside
