= Alkan Chaglar =

Alkan Boudewijn de Beaumont Chaglar (born August 5, 1981 in London) is a Canadian and British journalist. He used to be editor and columnist for the Turkish Cypriot weekly bilingual (English-Turkish) newspaper Toplum Postası. He is currently Editor-in-Chief of the UK-based The Cypriot Chronicle and a member of the L'Association des journalistes indépendants du Québec. He currently lives in Montreal, Quebec, Canada.

In his weekly column Cultural Encounters Chaglar writes with a passion for cross-cultural influences and diversity in multi-ethnic countries and the state of minority languages in the World. Coming from a Turkish Cypriot background, Chaglar expressed an interest in the phenomena of Crypto-Christians and the issue of conversion to Islam in Cyprus. On May 5, 2006 in Toplum Postasi Chaglar wrote about the Latins and Maronites in Cyprus who proselytised to Islam during Ottoman rule. He argued that "The fact is a substantial number of today’s Muslim Turkish Cypriots have a Christian past, and are partly descended from those Venetian, Genovese and French families that had estates on the island who proselytised to Sunni Islam. "Cypriot historians from both sides of the divide tend to focus too much on our Greco-Turkish heritage, at the expense of objectivity, but Cyprus has and always will be a convergence of cultures".

Alkan also writes about political events in Cyprus and Turkey. His articles have been published from time to time in the Daily Turkish News and the Cyprus Mail. Often controversial, his most recent article in The Cyprus Mail is "Why Turkish Cypriots should not celebrate 1974" and "Why Cyprus cannot exclude its Turkish settlers".

But his interests also extend to the Antipodes. Chaglar wrote extensively about the threat of destruction of the New Guinean rainforest, and the tribes and rare species that they provide habitation for. In his article "Terra Incognita" published on May 25, 2006, Chaglar drew attention to the deforestation of the New Guinean rainforest together with the recent discoveries of birds of paradise in the North Western mountain region. He called for greater responsibility on the part of the Indonesian and Papua New Guinean governments and for a switch over to eco-tourism to replace the revenue derived from logging.

Chaglar also wrote extensively about Inter-planetary Alliances in the Moluccas or Spice Islands, the plight of the banishment of the "Acadians" and the formation of the Cajuns. Among his more recent articles are "Marooned on Tristan", Chastity and Austere living, and Ferocious Waterfalls and Guanos.
