= List of Turkish Cypriots =

The following is a list of people of full or partial Turkish Cypriot origin. This includes notable people in the community who were born on the island of Cyprus during the Ottoman era (1570-1878/1914), the British era (1878/1914-1960), as well as with the formation of the Republic of Cyprus (1960–present), the Turkish Federated State of Cyprus (1975–83), and the Turkish Republic of Northern Cyprus (1983–present).

In addition, due to the large Turkish Cypriot diaspora living outside of the island, there are many notable people of Turkish Cypriot origin who are living in Turkey, the United Kingdom, Australia, the United States, Canada, Jordan, Egypt, Germany, New Zealand, Norway etc. These individuals are listed with their citizenship (i.e. as "Turkish", "British", "Australian", "American", "Canadian", "Jordanian", "Egyptian", "German", "New Zealander", "Norwegian" etc.) alongside their notability and connection to the Turkish Cypriot community. Those with dual citizenship (i.e. who were born in Cyprus and have emigrated abroad) are listed as "Turkish Cypriot-born" alongside the citizenship they have acquired.

== Academia and medicine ==
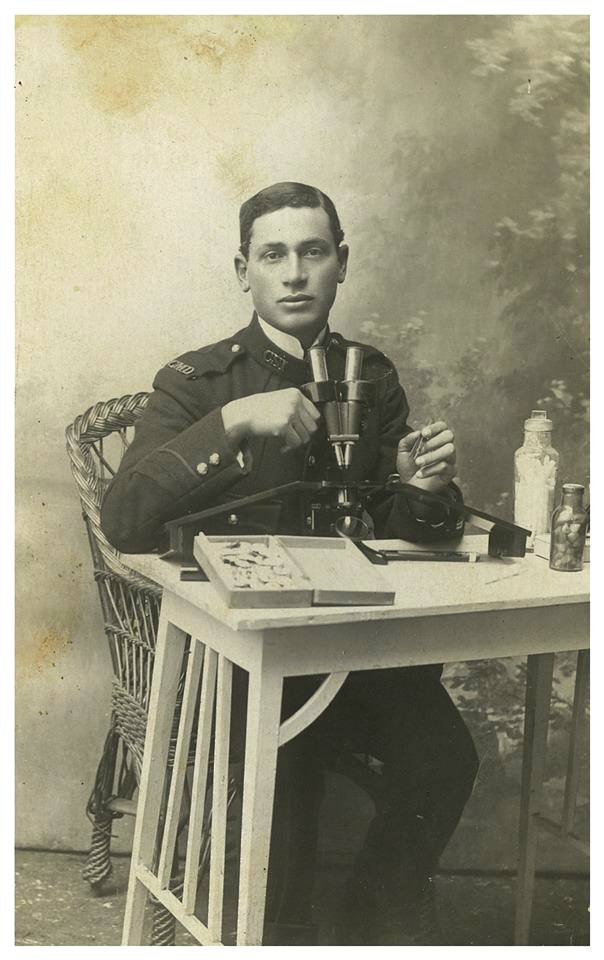
Mehmet Aziz

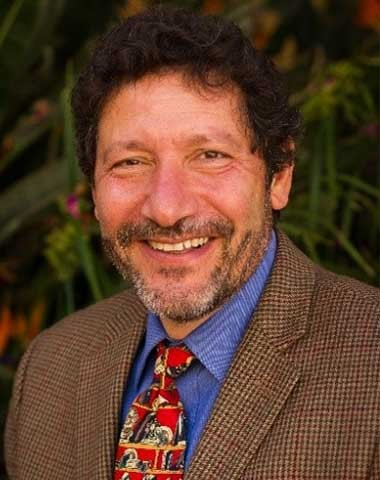
Halil Güven

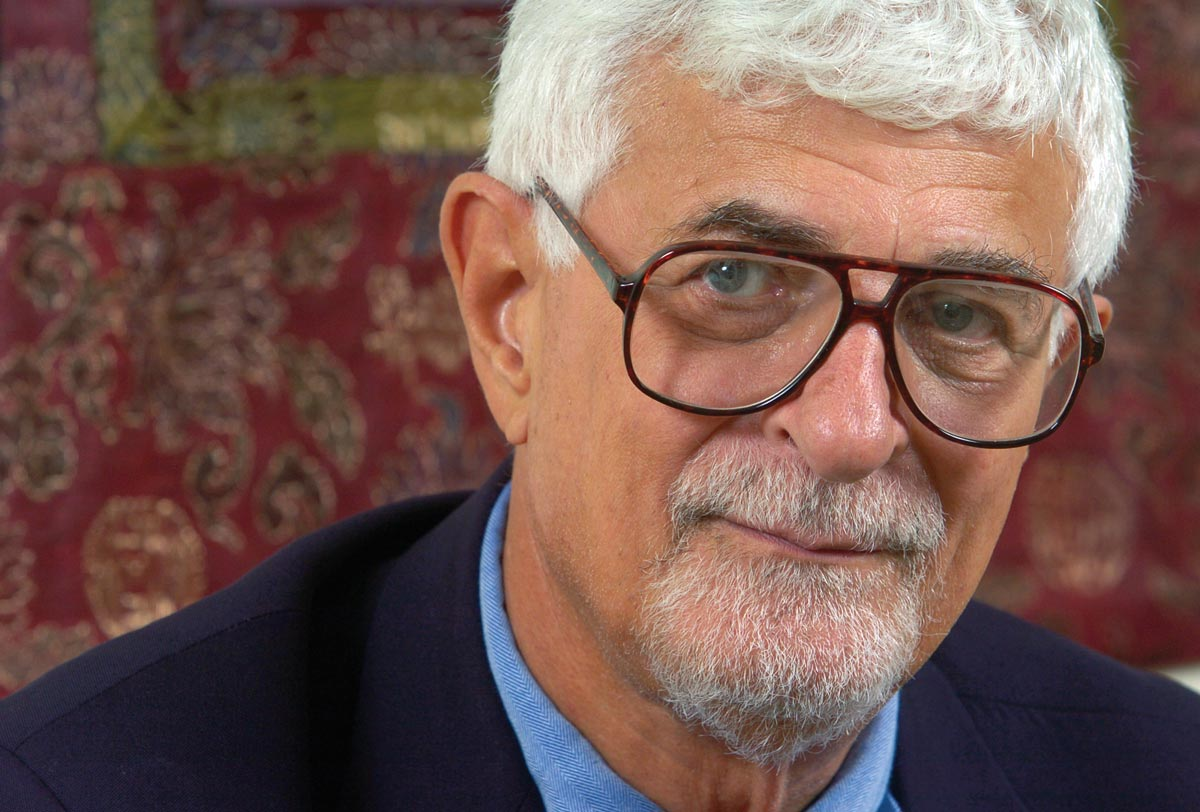
Vamık Volkan

- Mehmet Aziz, medical researcher; widely credited with eradicating malaria in Cyprus
- Türkan Aziz, the first female Chief Matron of Nicosia (appointed in 1963)
- Erkin Bairam, Turkish Cypriot-born New Zealander economist at the University of Otago
- Ulus Baker, Turkish-born sociologist (Turkish Cypriot parents)
- Niyazi Berkes, sociologist
- Süleyman Başak, British Professor of Finance at the London Business School
- Servet Sami Dedeçay, criminologist
- Mustafa Djamgoz, British Professor of Cancer Biology at Imperial College London and Chairman of the College of Medicine’s Science Council
- Ahmet Bican Ercilasun, Turkish-born linguist, Turcologist and author (Turkish Cypriot father)
- Erol Erduran, educator
- Fahir Ersin, Turkish political scientist and journalist (Turkish Cypriot father)
- Ten Feizi, FMedSci FRS, Turkish Cypriot-born British Professor and Director of the Glycosciences Laboratory at Imperial College London
- Bayram Göçmen, parasitologist, herpetologist, taxonomist and nature photographer
- Halil Güven, Turkish Cypriot-born American mechanical engineer; Dean of San Diego State University - Georgia
- Melahat Hulusi Hacıbulgur, head of the first blood bank established in Cyprus in (1953–63); established and directed a second blood bank in the Turkish part of Nicosia (1963–70)
- Mustafa Halilsoy, theoretical physicist
- Mehmet Hasgüler, political scientist
- Ozay Mehmet, Turkish Cypriot-born Canadian professor of international affairs at Carleton University
- Kerim Munir, Turkish Cypriot-born American professor of pediatrics and psychiatry, Boston Children's Hospital at Harvard University; directed development of the National Mental Health Policy for Turkey (https://pmc.ncbi.nlm.nih.gov/articles/PMC3166637/)
- Kamil Özerk, Turkish Cypriot-born Norwegian Professor of Pedagogy at the University of Oslo
- Öztekin Öztekiner, physician
- Necmettin Pamir, neurosurgery
- Gökçe Yükselen Peler, Cyprus Studies, Turkic Languages
- Asım Vehbi, educator; CEO and Vice-Chancellor of Girne American University
- Vamık Volkan, Turkish Cypriot-born American Professor of Psychiatry at the University of Virginia
- Kamer Yusuf, one of the first Turkish Cypriot women pharmacists

== Arts and literature ==
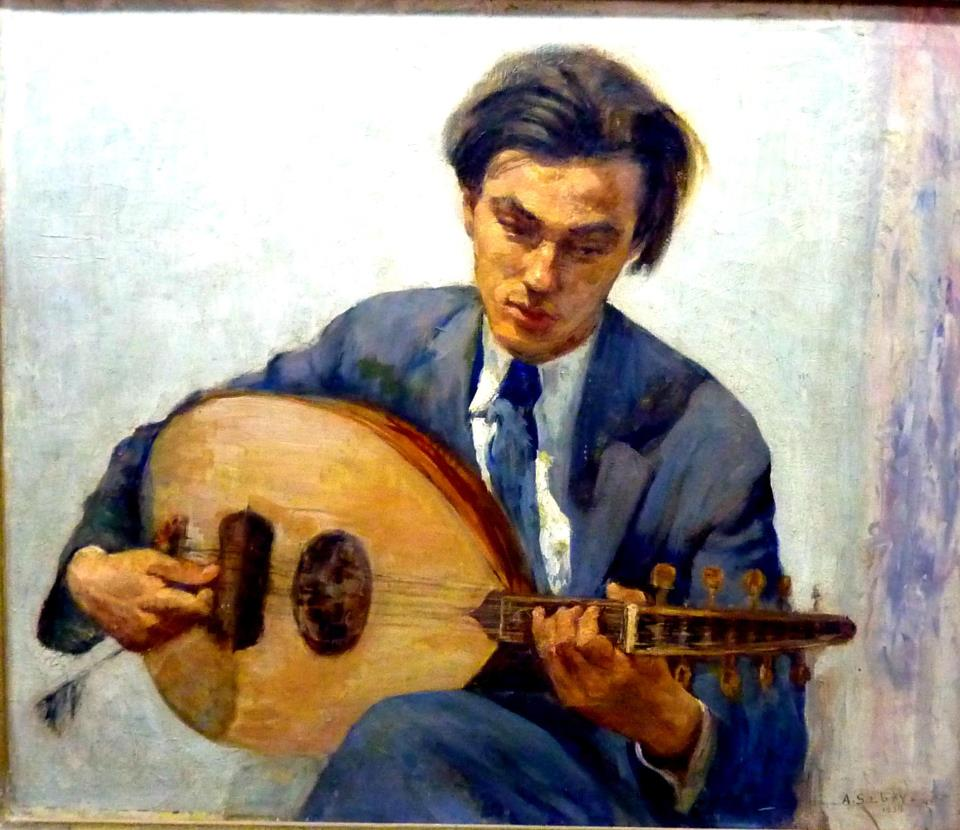
Hussein Bicar

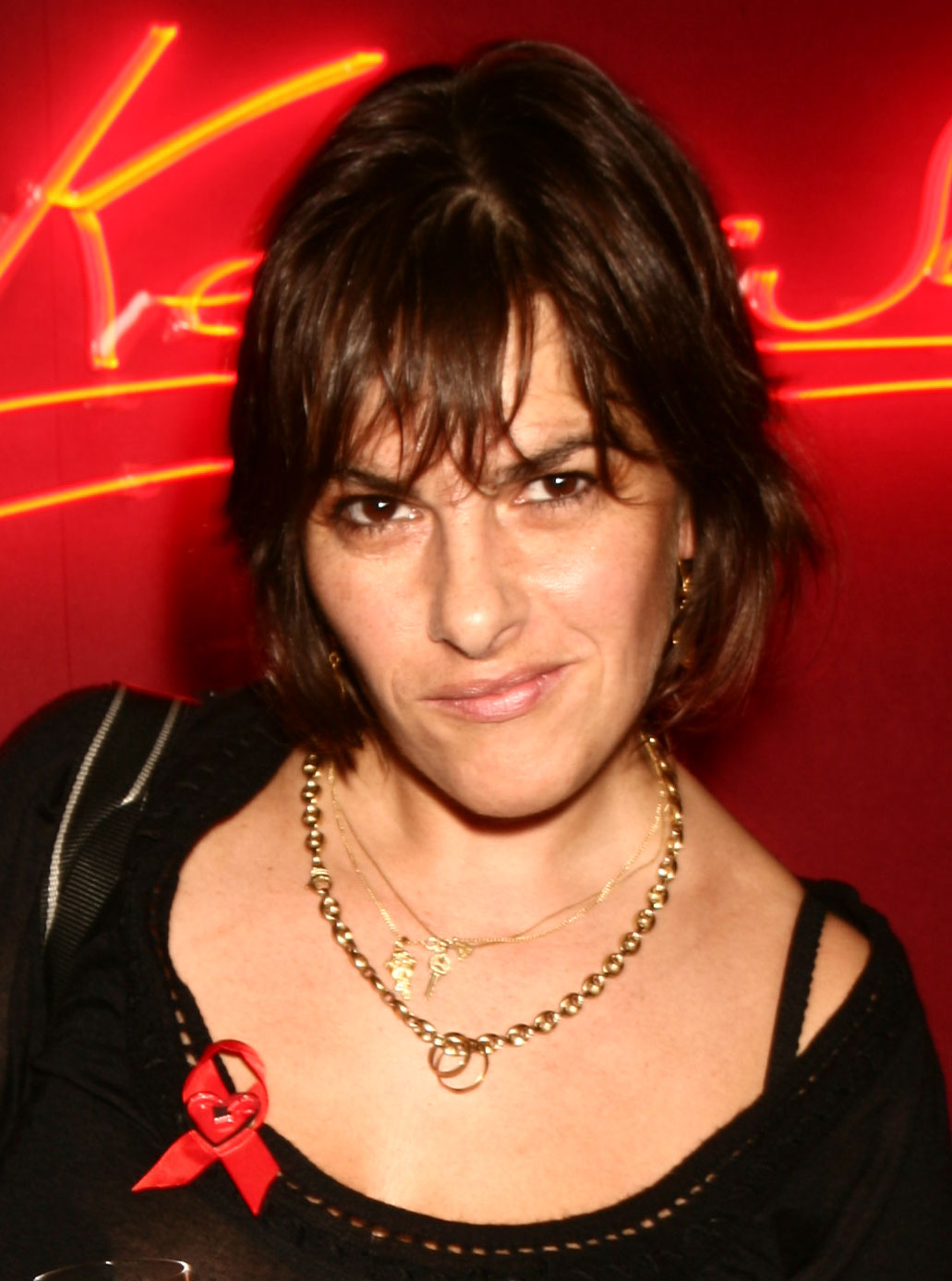
Tracey Emin

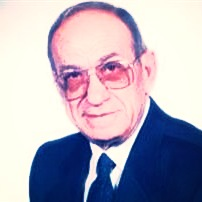
İsmet Güney

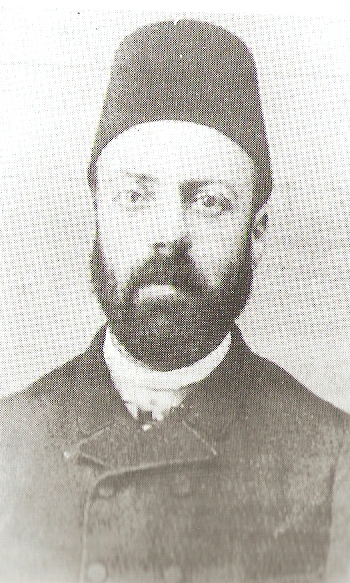
Kaytazzade Mehmet Nazım

- Mustafa İzzet Adiloğlu, poet
- Ayhatun Ateşin, ceramic artist
- Ruzen Atakan, painter
- Ibrahim Aziz, political analyst
- Urkiye Mine Balman, poet
- Taner Baybars, Turkish Cypriot-born British poet (Turkish Cypriot parents)
- Hussein Bicar, Egyptian-born painter (Turkish Cypriot origin)
- Neriman Cahit, poet; a vocal advocate of women's rights
- Cevdet Hüseyin Çağdaş, painter and museologist
- Mutlu Çerkez, British-born Australian artist (Turkish Cypriot parents)
- Emin Çizenel, painter
- Fikret Demirağ, poet
- Nazif Süleyman Ebeoğlu, poet
- Hasan Hilmi Efendi, Ottoman poet
- Tracey Emin, British-born artist (Turkish Cypriot father)
- İsmet Güney, artist; designer of the Flag of Cyprus
- Nilgün Güney, painter and writer
- Feride Hikmet, poet
- Mustafa Hulusi, British-born artist (Turkish Cypriot parents)
- Ümit Hussein, British-born literary translator and interpreter (Turkish Cypriot parents)
- Yaşar İsmailoğlu, Turkish Cypriot-born British poet
- Hilmi İleri, author and screenwriter (Turkish Cypriot father)
- Hikmet Afif Mapolar, novelist
- Erten Kasımoğlu, cartoonist
- Pembe Marmara, poet
- Filiz Naldöven, poet
- Kaytazzade Mehmet Nazım, Ottoman poet
- Ali Nesim, poet
- Arif Ozakca, British-born artist (Turkish Cypriot origin)
- Kâmil Özay, poet
- Faize Özdemirciler, poet
- Ejdan Sadrazam, poet
- Özden Selenge, painter and writer
- Zehra Şonya, sculptor and academic
- Hasan Tahsin, Ottoman poet
- Şinasi Tekman, painter, sculptor, poet and writer
- Osman Türkay, poet; nominee for the Nobel Prize for Literature in 1988
- Süleyman Uluçamgil, poet
- Gürkan Uluçhan, writer
- Semih Sait Umar, writer
- Derviş Vahdeti, Ottoman journalist, writer and clergyman
- Mehmet Yaşın, poet and author
- Neşe Yaşın, poet and author
- Özker Yaşın, poet and author

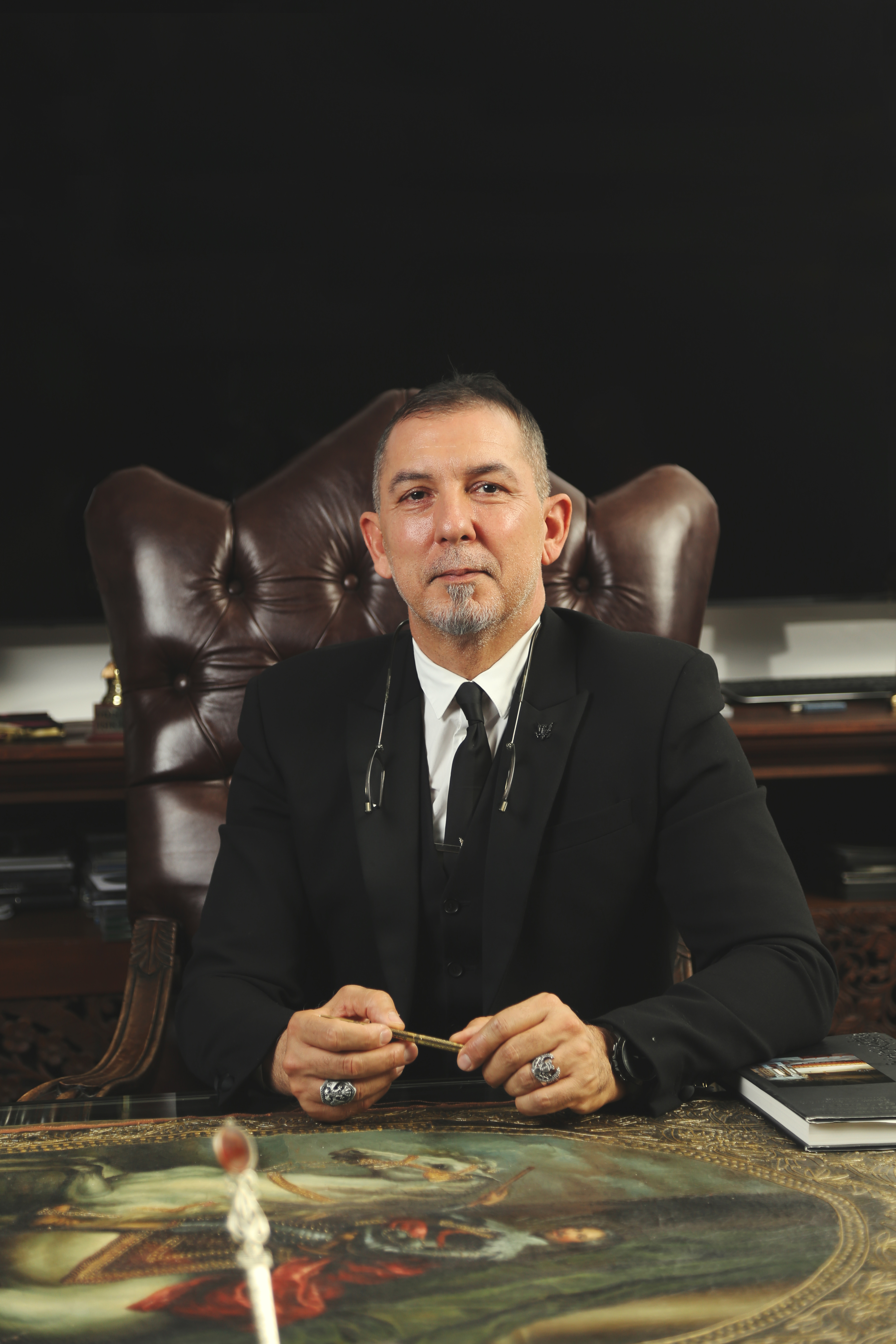
Serhat Akpınar

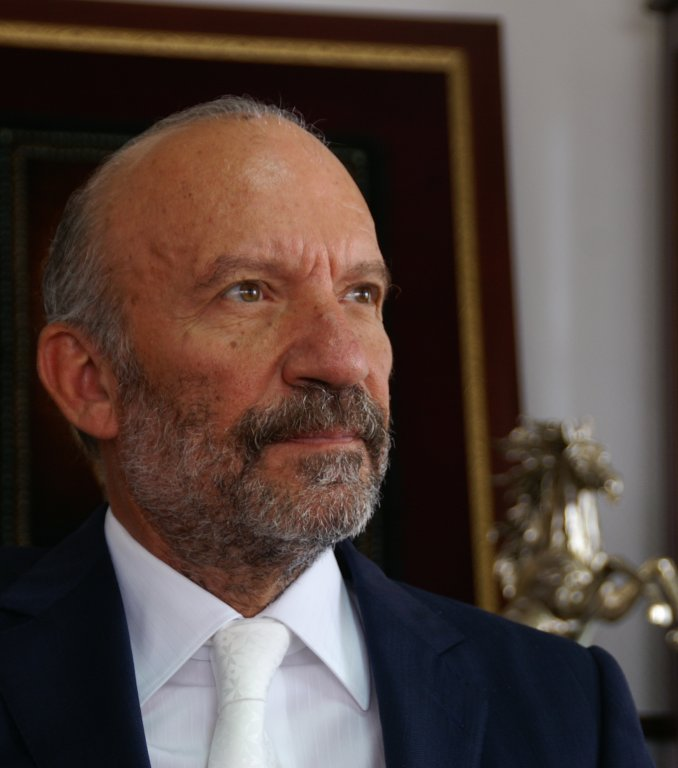
Suat Günsel

== Business ==
- Serhat Akpınar, entrepreneur and educator; founder of Girne American University and American University of Cyprus
- Besim Tibuk, businessman
- Mehmet Dalman, Turkish Cypriot-born British investment banker and chairman of Welsh football club Cardiff City
- Bulent Hass Dellal, Australian-born director and chairman of the Special Broadcasting Service (Turkish Cypriot parents)
- Memduh Erdal, businessman
- Şemsi Kazım Erkman, billionaire businessman
- Ali Ozmen Safa, businessman
- Suat Günsel, billionaire; property developer and founder of the Near East University
- Ali Guryel, British entrepreneur; founder of Bromcom
- Hattie Hasan, MBE, British-born CEO of the Stopcocks Women Plumbers (Turkish Cypriot parents)
- Asil Nadir, Billionaire businessman
- Ozerk Ozan Norwegian fintech entrepreneur
- Touker Suleyman, Turkish Cypriot-born British fashion retail entrepreneur and a "dragon" on Dragon's Den

== Cinema and television ==
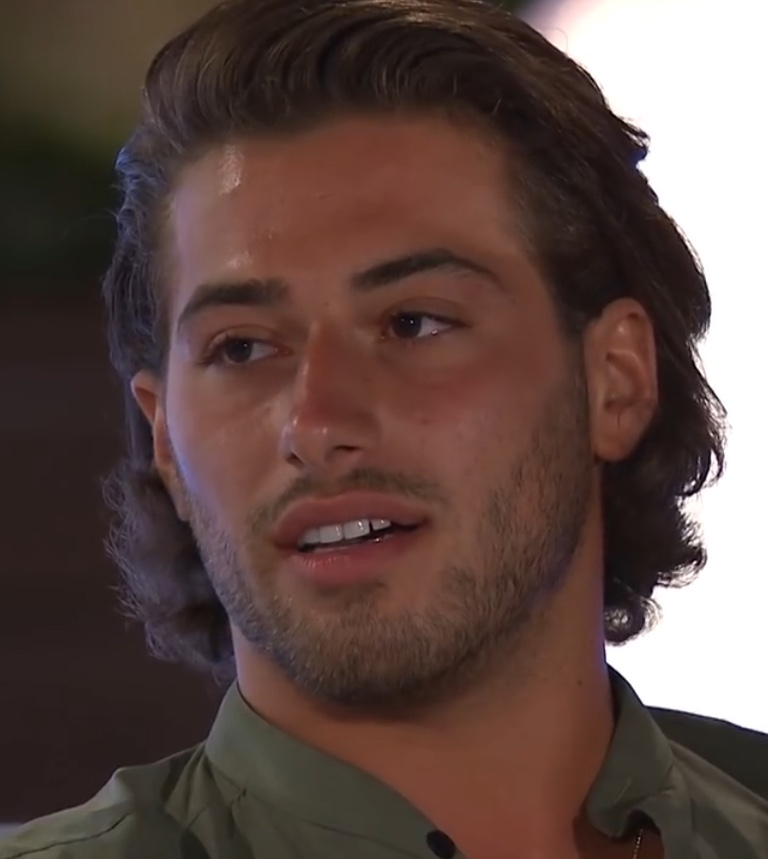
Kem Cetinay

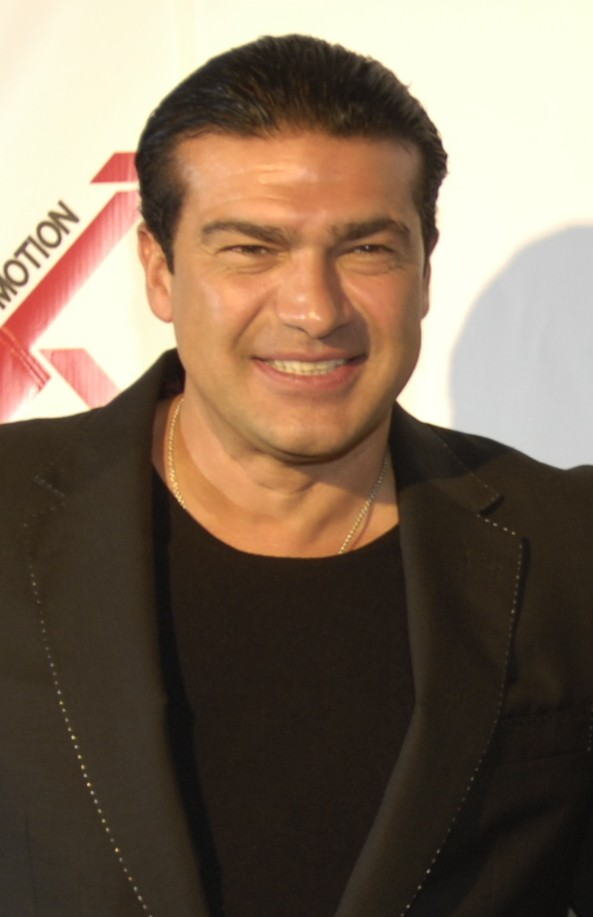
Tamer Hassan

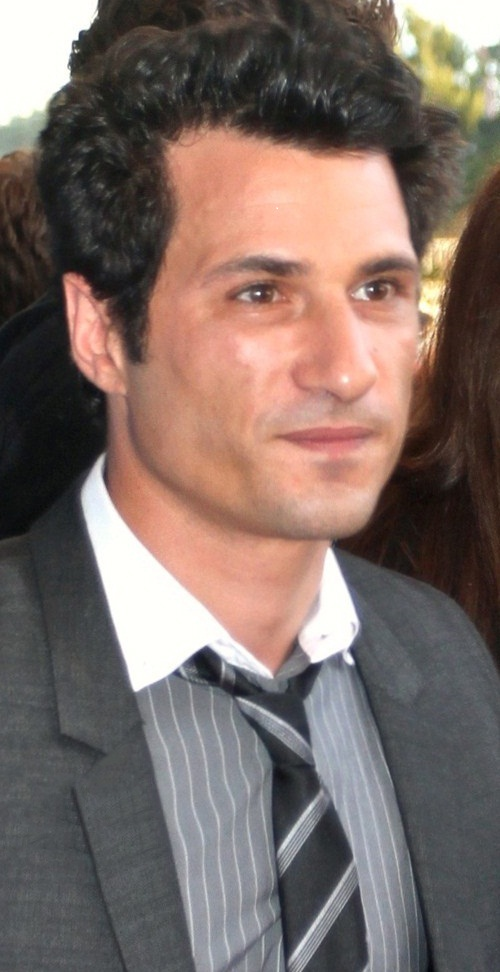
Hal Ozsan

- Nej Adamson, British-born actor (Turkish Cypriot parents)
- Zeki Alasya, Turkish-born actor (Turkish Cypriot origin; descendant of Kıbrıslı Mehmed Kamil Pasha)
- Osman Alkaş, actor
- Ferhat Atik, filmmaker, scenario writer and novelist
- Feri Cansel, Turkish Cypriot-born British and Turkish actress
- Zümrüt Cansel, British-born Turkish actress (Turkish Cypriot mother)
- Kem Cetinay, British-born TV personality and rapper (Turkish Cypriot parents)
- Haldun Dormen, Turkish-born actor (Turkish Cypriot father)
- Ali Düşenkalkar, actor
- Munis Düşenkalkar, Turkish-born actor (Turkish Cypriot origin)
- Aslı Enver, British-born Turkish actress (Turkish Cypriot father)
- Hazar Ergüçlü, actress
- Mem Ferda, British-born actor (Turkish Cypriot parents)
- Tamer Garip, film director
- Tamer Hassan, British-born actor (Turkish Cypriot parents)
- Belle Hassan, British-born model; Season 5 of Love Island (Turkish Cypriot father)
- Aykut Hilmi, British-born actor (Turkish Cypriot father)
- Metin Hüseyin, British-born film director (Turkish Cypriot parents)
- Hüseyin Köroğlu, actor
- Erim Metto, British-born film director (Turkish Cypriot parents)
- Mem Morrison, British-born actor (Turkish Cypriot parents)
- Erkan Mustafa, British-born actor (Turkish Cypriot parents)
- Cosh Omar, British-born actor (Turkish Cypriot parents)
- Hal Ozsan, Turkish Cypriot-born British and American actor
- İnci Pars Özgürgün, actress
- Selen Öztürk, Turkish-born actress (Turkish Cypriot mother)
- Erol Refikoğlu, actor; co-founder of the Nicosia Municipal Theater
- Sinem Saban, Australian-born film writer, producer, director, and human rights activist (Turkish Cypriot parents)
- Tolga Safer, British-born actor (Turkish Cypriot parents)
- Meliz Serman, British-born stage actress
- Kemal Shahin, British-born Big Brother contestant (Turkish Cypriot parents)
- Anna Silk, Canadian-born actress (Turkish Cypriot-British mother)
- Ilkay Silk, CC, Turkish Cypriot-born Canadian actress, playwright, producer, and educator
- Mine Teber, actress
- Aden Theobald, British-born Big Brother contestant (Turkish Cypriot mother)
- Üner Ulutuğ, theatre artist and director
- Sezer Yurtseven, British-born Big Brother contestant (Turkish Cypriot parents)
- Anatol Yusef, British-born actor (Turkish Cypriot parents)
- Derviş Zaim, filmmaker
- ekin-su cülcüloğlu, love island contestant

== Design and fashion ==
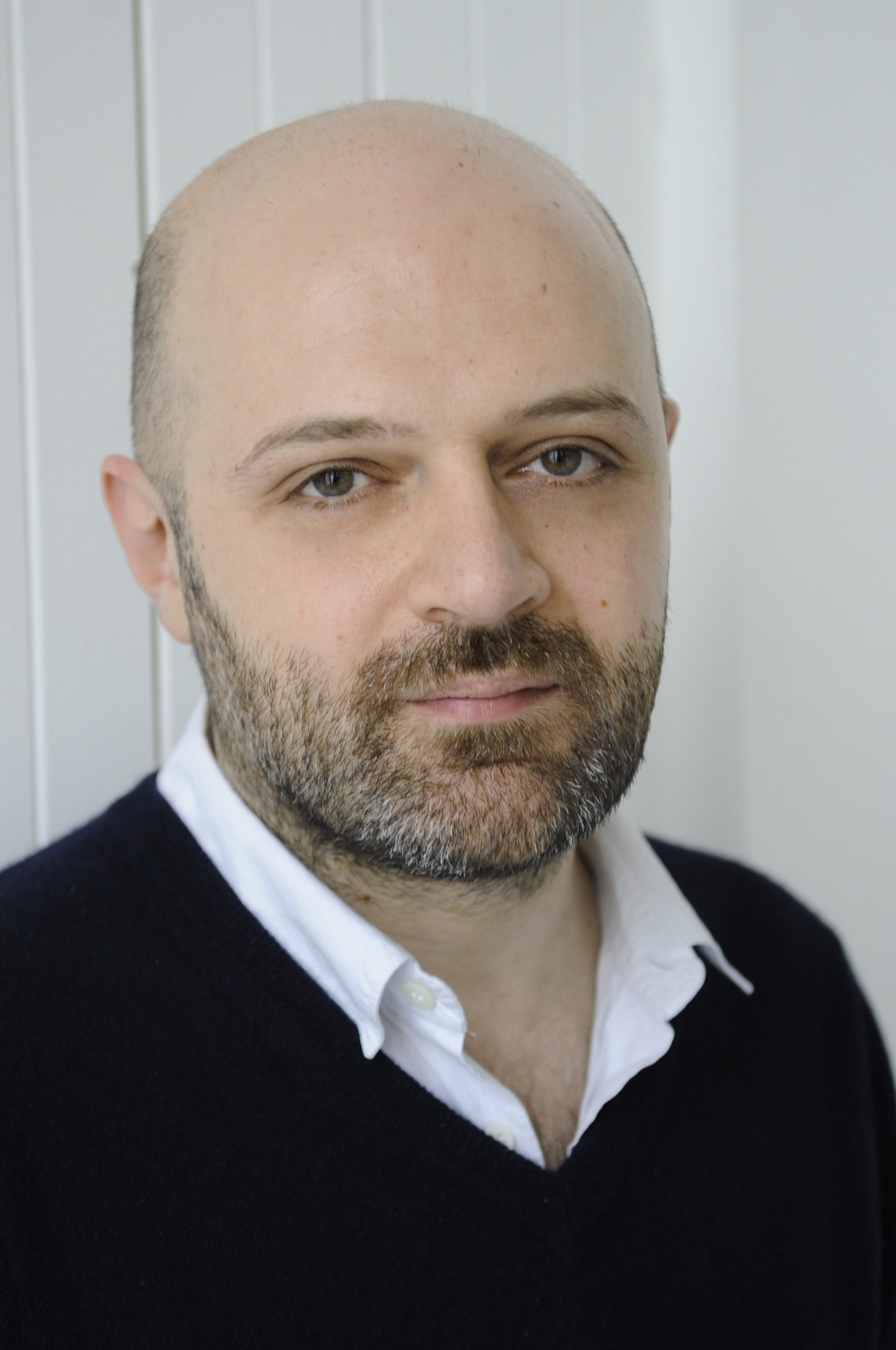
Hussein Chalayan

- Mustafa Aslanturk, Turkish Cypriot-born British fashion designer
- Hussein Chalayan, MBE, Turkish Cypriot-born British fashion designer
- Nasir Mazhar, British-born fashion designer (Turkish Cypriot parents)

== Food ==
- Refika Birgül, Turkish-born celebrity chef (Turkish Cypriot mother)
- Selin Kiazim, British-born chef and winner of the Great British Menu (Turkish Cypriot parents)
- Ismail Tosun, Turkish-born Australian celebrity chef (Turkish Cypriot mother)

== Journalism ==
- Kutlu Adalı, peace advocate
- Alkan Chaglar, British-born Canadian journalist (Turkish Cypriot parents)
- Başaran Düzgün, journalist
- Haşmet Muzaffer Gürkan, journalist, writer and researcher
- Bener Hakkı Hakeri, journalist
- Yücel Hatay, sports journalist
- Ayhan Hikmet, journalist; editor of the Turkish Cypriot weekly newspaper Cumhuriyet
- Metin Münir, journalist
- Fazıl Önder, journalist; peace advocate
- Sevgül Uludağ, journalist, peace and gender activist

== Law ==
- Gönül Başaran Erönen, British-born judge in the TRNC Supreme Court (Turkish Cypriot origin)
- Narin Ferdi Şefik, President of the TRNC Supreme Court

== Military ==
- Patrick Azimkar, British-born soldier killed during the Massereene Barracks shooting in 2009 (Turkish Cypriot father)

== Music ==
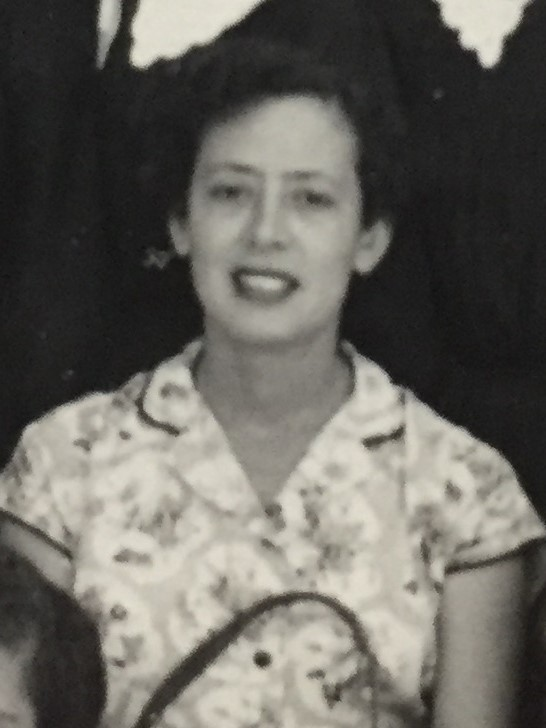
Kamran Aziz

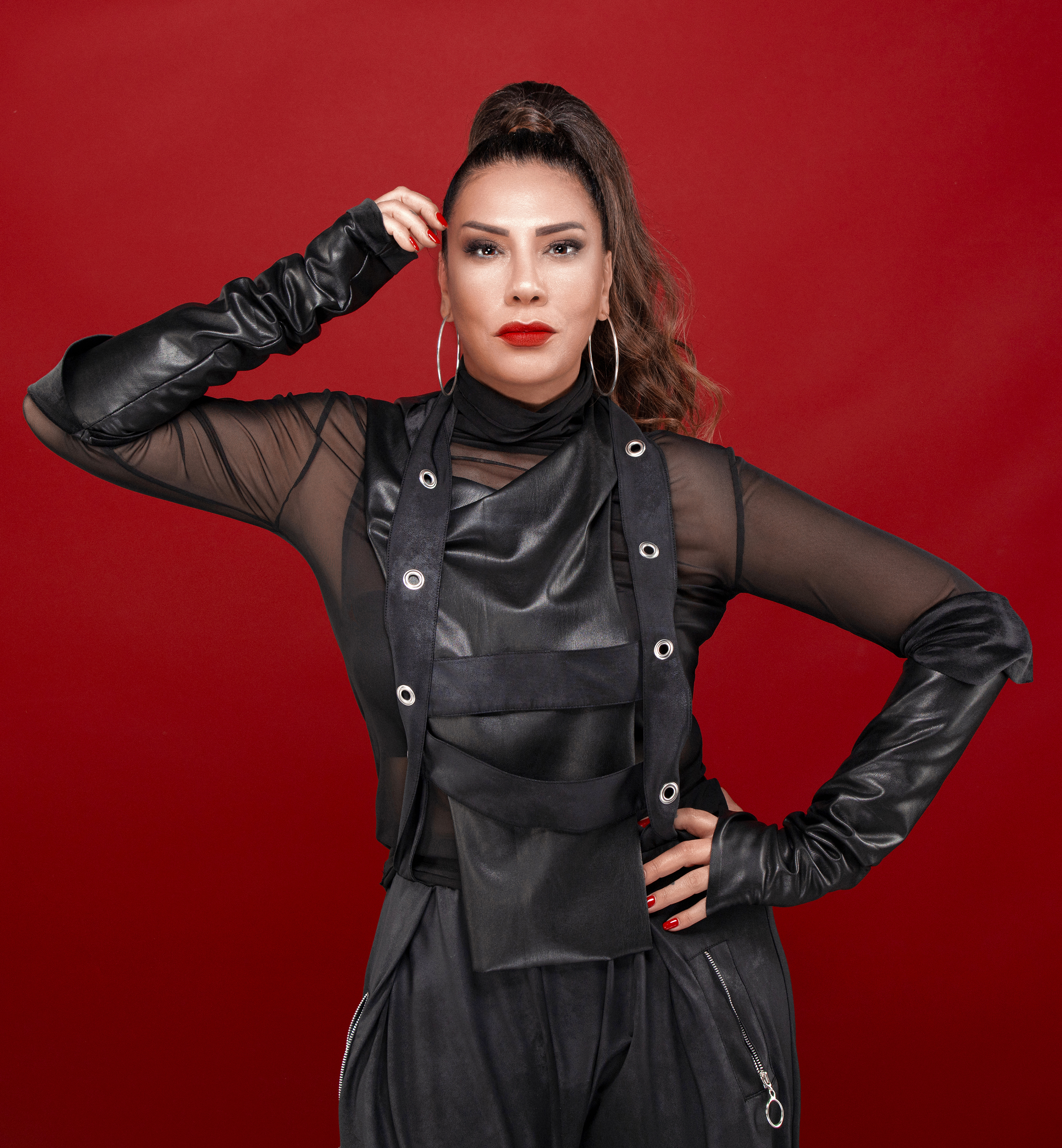
Işın Karaca

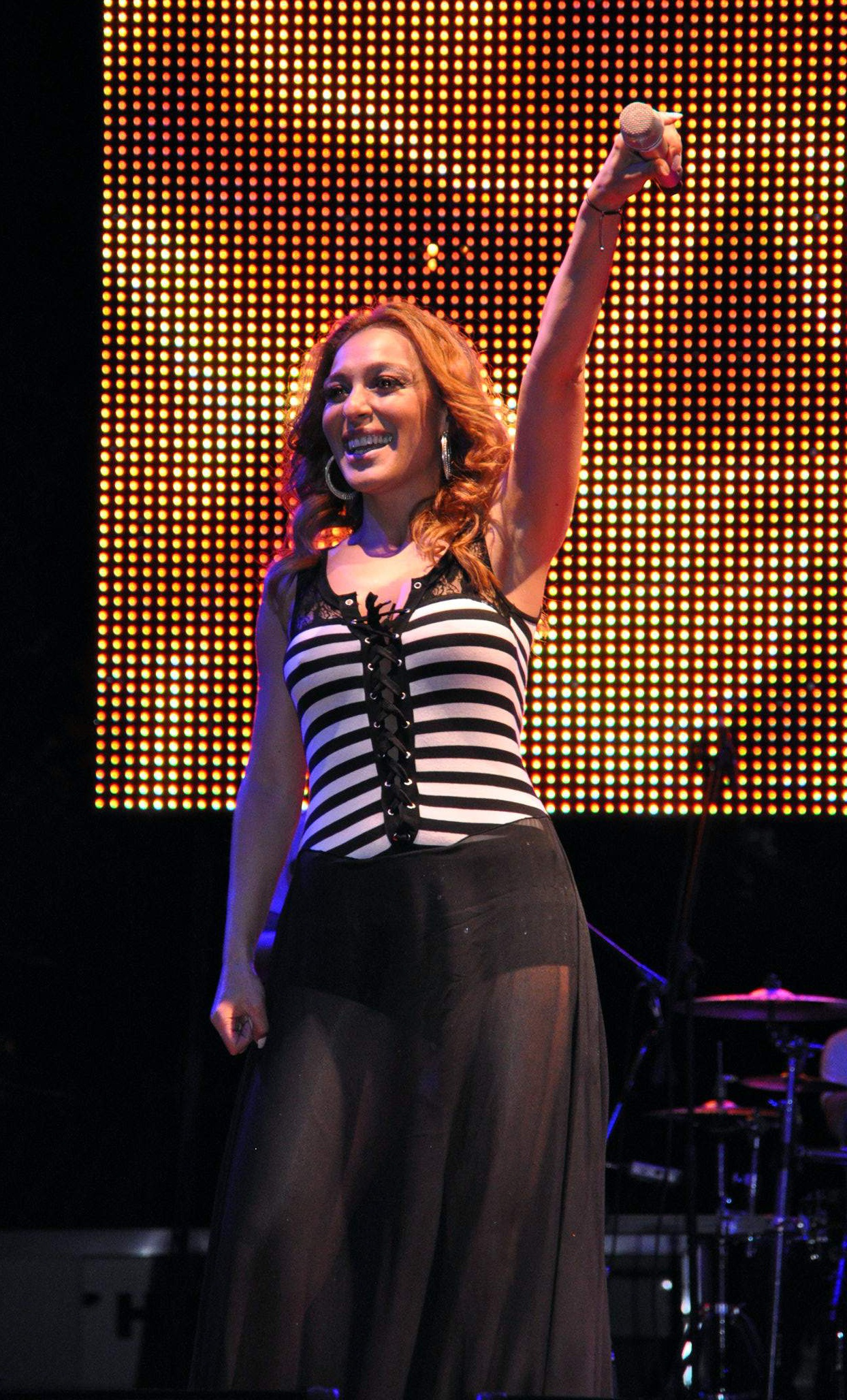
Ziynet Sali

- Acar Akalın, composer, guitarist and singer
- Beyhan Demirdağ Alkan, mezzo-soprano
- Erol Alkan, British-born DJ and producer
- Kader Ateş, singer
- Peri Aziz, British-born singer and former member of Babutsa
- Kamran Aziz, musician
- Nil Burak, pop singer and actress
- Buray, pop singer
- Gültekin Çeki, Turkish-born classical music singer and composer (Turkish Cypriot father)
- En Derin, singer
- Jale Derviş, pianist
- Genco Ecer, Turkish-born singer (Turkish Cypriot father)
- Okan Ersan, jazz fusion guitarist, composer and record artist
- Oytun Ersan, bass guitarist and composer
- Aslı Giray, Turkish-born musician
- Jane Remover, American musician
- Turgay Hilmi, French horn player
- Atila Huseyin, British-born jazz singer
- Işın Karaca, British-born Turkish singer (Turkish Cypriot mother)
- Fikri Karayel, rock singer and songwriter
- Tolga Kashif, British-born music conductor
- Eylem Kızıl, British-born singer (Turkish Cypriot parents)
- Dogan Mehmet, British-born musician (Turkish Cypriot parents)
- Ayla Peksoylu, British-born singer (Turkish Cypriot father)
- Arman Ratip, pianist
- Ziynet Sali, Turkish Cypriot-born British singer
- SOS, rock band
- Zeliş Şenol, singer
- Ali Sönmez, British-born musician; lead singer of Babutsa
- Rüya Taner, German-born pianist (Turkish Cypriot parents)
- Tash, British-born singer
- Deniz Tekin, musician and songwriter (Turkish Cypriot origin)
- Soner Türsoy, Turkish Cypriot-born British musician; member of Babutsa
- B Young, British-born rapper and singer-songwriter

== Politics ==
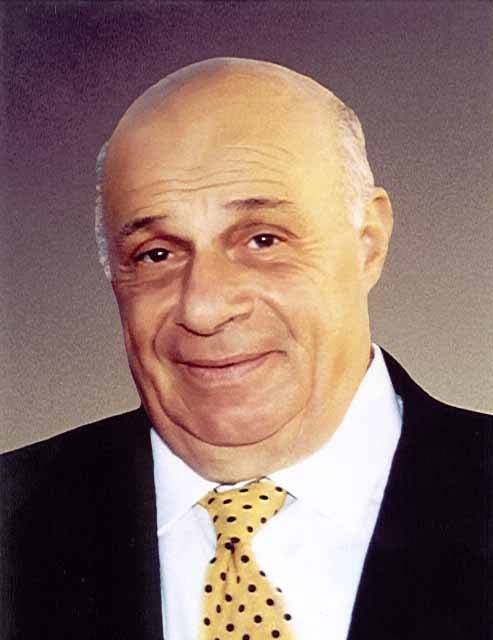
Rauf Denktaş

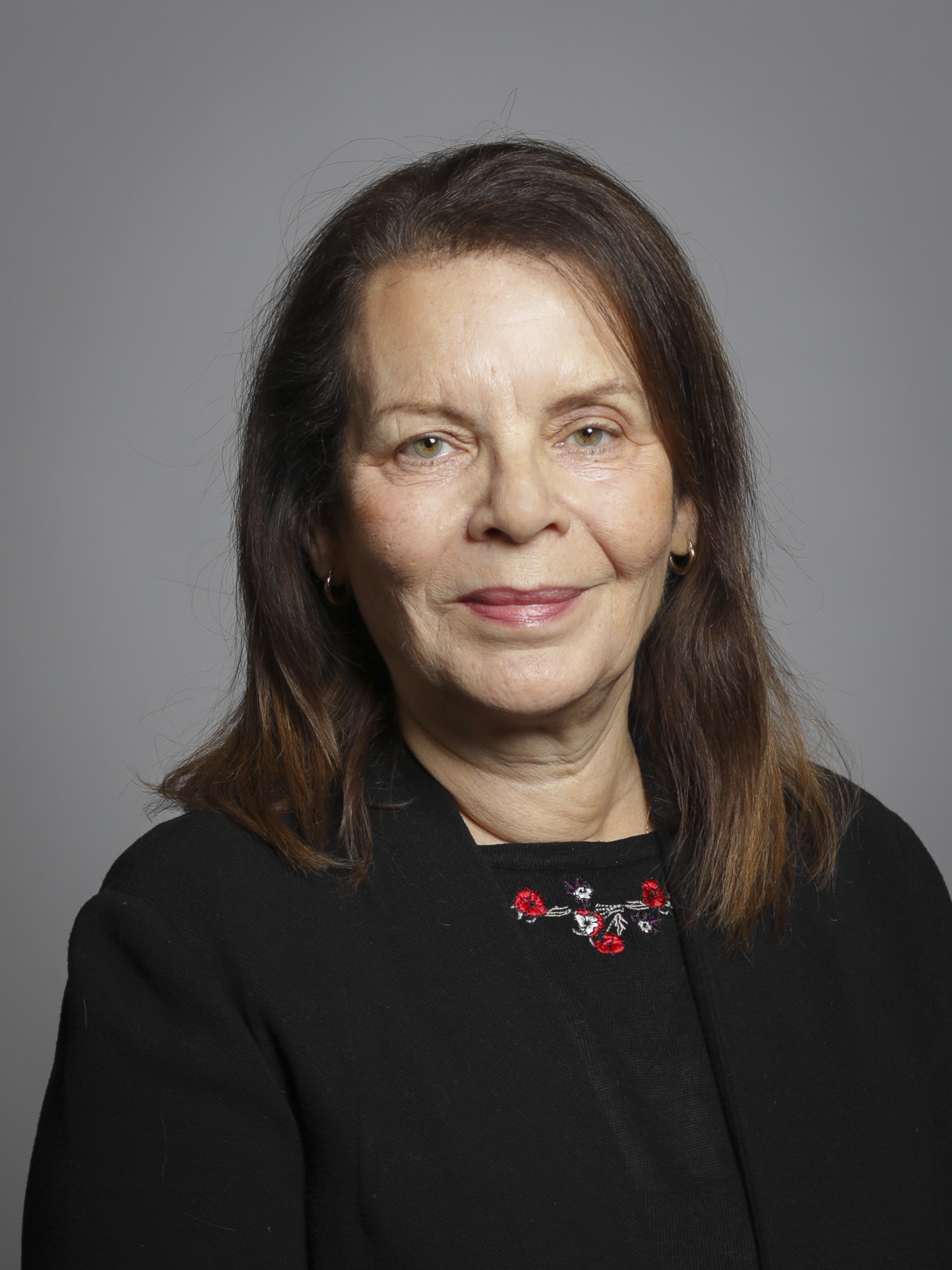
Meral Hussein-Ece

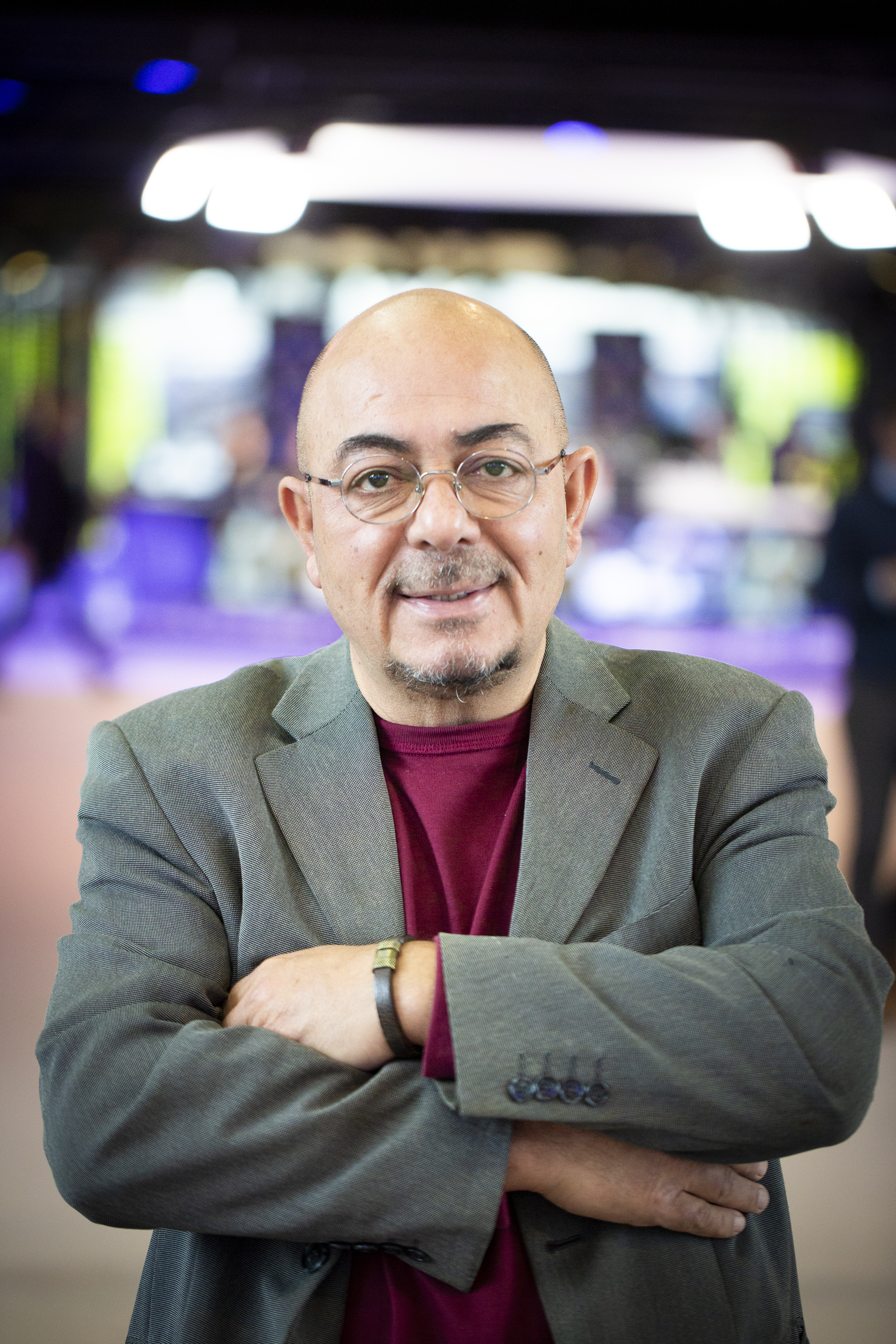
Niyazi Kızılyürek

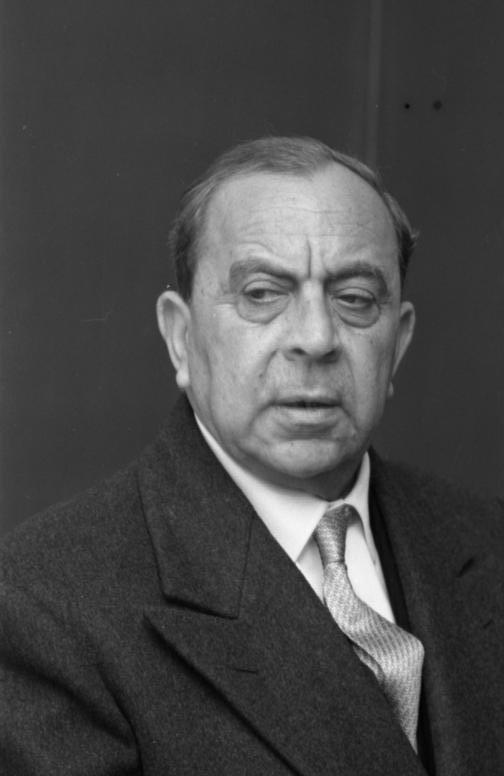
Fazıl Küçük

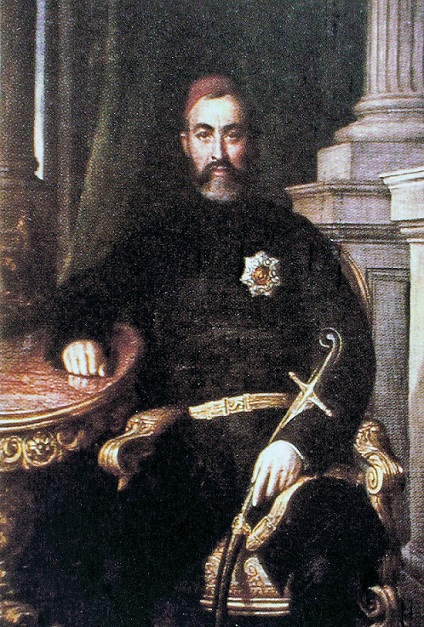
Kıbrıslı Mehmed Emin Pasha

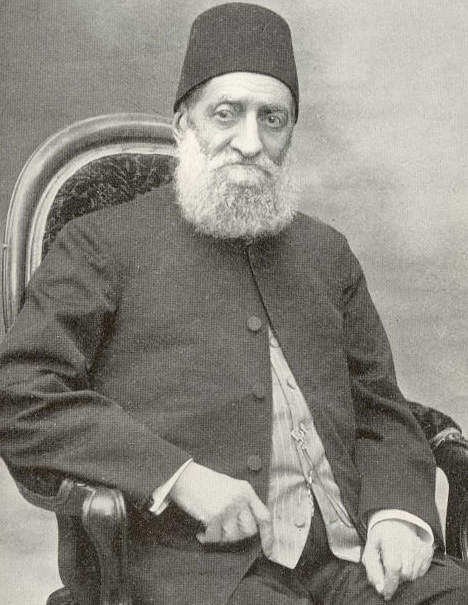
Kâmil Pasha

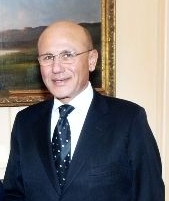
Mehmet Ali Talat

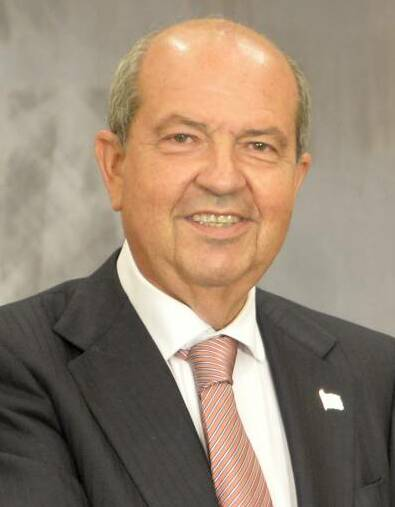
Ersin Tatar

- Sonay Adem, TRNC Minister for Labor and Social Security (2005–09)
- Asım Akansoy, TRNC Minister of Interior and Labor (2015–16)
- Mustafa Akıncı, President of Northern Cyprus (2015–20)
- Hakkı Atun, Prime Minister of Northern Cyprus (1994–96)
- Perihan Arıburun, Turkish politician (Turkish Cypriot origin; descendant of Kıbrıslı Mehmed Kamil Pasha)
- Hüseyin Sırrı Bellioğlu, Turkish MP for İzmit (Kocaeli) (1920–23)(1931–35), one of the founding members of the Turkish Parliament, (born in Nicosia)
- Turgay Avcı, leader of the Freedom and Reform Party (ÖRP)
- Ahmet Yalçın Benli, Mayor of Gönyeli (2006–present)
- Ahmet Mithat Berberoğlu, founder of the Republican Turkish Party (CTP)
- Beran Bertuğ, first female kaymakam of Gazimağusa
- Filiz Besim, Minister of Health (2018–present)
- Hasan Bozer, speaker of the Assembly of Northern Cyprus (2009–13)
- Gülsen Bozkurt, Minister of Health and the Environment (1999–2001)
- Cemal Metin Bulutoğluları, Mayor of the Nicosia Turkish Municipality (2006–13)
- Nesil Caliskan, British-born politician; Enfield London Borough Council's first female leader (Turkish Cypriot parents)
- Fuat Celalettin, Mayor of the Nicosia Turkish Municipality (1962–1969)
- Mete Coban, MBE, Turkish-Cypriot born British Labour Councillor for Stoke Newington; founder of My Life My Say
- Mustafa Çağatay, Prime Minister of the Turkish Federated State of Cyprus and the TRNC (1978–83)
- Mehmet Çakıcı, first leader of the Communal Democracy Party (TDP) (2007–13)
- Zeki Çeler, member of the TDP
- Emine Çolak, TRNC minister of foreign affairs (2015–16)
- Derviş Kemal Deniz, TRNC minister of economy and tourism
- Raif Denktaş, UBP MP (1983–85)
- Rauf Denktaş, second vice president of Cyprus (1973–74); first president of Northern Cyprus (1983–2005)
- Serdar Denktaş, leader of the Democratic Party (1996–2018); Deputy President of Northern Cyprus (1996–98; 2005–06; 2013–15; and 2016–19)
- Doğuş Derya, CTP MP (2013–present)
- Meral Ece, British-born politician; Liberal Democrats member of the House of Lords (Turkish Cypriot parents)
- Emma Edhem, British-born councilwoman of the City of London Corporation (Turkish Cypriot parents)
- Fatma Ekenoğlu, first female Speaker of the Republican Assembly of Northern Cyprus (2004–09)
- Ahmet Erdengiz, Ambassador of the TRNC to the United States of America (1998–2002)
- Kutlay Erk, Mayor of the Nicosia Turkish Municipality (2002–06)
- Tufan Erhürman, Prime Minister of Northern Cyprus (2018–19)
- Derviş Eroğlu, Prime Minister of Northern Cyprus (1985–94, 1996–2004 and 2009–10); third president of Northern Cyprus (2010–15)
- Tahsin Ertuğruloğlu, minister of foreign affairs and defense (1998-2004; 2016–18; 2020-present)
- Ahmet Şükrü Esmer, Turkish MP for Istanbul (1939–1943)(1943–46) (born in Nicosia)
- Kadri Fellahoğlu, Mayor of the Nicosia Turkish Municipality (2013–14)
- Tahsin Gözmen, first mayor of the Nicosia Turkish Municipality (1958–1961)
- Hüseyin Fatin Güvendiren, Turkish MP for Trabzon (1931–35)(1935–39)(1939–1943)(1943–46), (born in Nicosia)
- Kadriye Hulusi Hacıbulgur, first woman in Cyprus to be a member of the Communal Chamber (1960–70)
- Mehmet Harmancı, Mayor of the Nicosia Turkish Municipality (2014–present)
- Richard Hickmet, British-born Conservative MP in 1983-87 (Turkish Cypriot father)
- Hutch Hussein, Australian-born State President of the Victorian branch of the Australian Labor Party (ALP) between 2016-19 (Turkish Cypriot parents)
- Sıla Usar İncirli, politician, neurologist, researcher and trade unionist
- Ömer Kalyoncu, Prime Minister of Northern Cyprus (2015–16)
- Ahmet Kaşif, member of UBP
- Derviş Ali Kavazoğlu, member of AKEL
- Oktay Kayalp, Mayor of Famagusta (1994–2014)
- Ayla Halit Kazım, first woman in Cyprus to be a member of the House of Representatives of Cyprus (1963)
- Niyazi Kızılyürek, first Turkish Cypriot to be elected as a Member of the European Parliament
- Nejat Konuk, Prime Minister of Northern Cyprus (1983–85)
- Namık Korhan, TRNC representative at Washington (1992–97); representative at London (2001–06); Ambassador to Turkey (2009–10)
- İsmet Kotak, co-founder of the Democratic People's Party and founder of the Free Democratic Party
- Fazıl Küçük, first vice president of the Republic of Cyprus (1959–73)
- İrsen Küçük, Prime Minister of Northern Cyprus (2010–13)
- Özdil Nami, British-born politician; Minister of Foreign Affairs of Northern Cyprus (2013–15); Minister of Economy and Energy of Northern Cyprus (2018–present) (Turkish Cypriot parents)
- Niyazi Manyera, first minister of health of the Republic of Cyprus (1960–74)
- Cevdet Mirata, deputy president of the Nicosia Turkish Municipality (1961–62)
- Özkan Murat, TRNC minister of interior
- Osman Örek, first minister of defence of the Republic of Cyprus (1960–64); Prime Minister of Northern Cyprus (1978)
- Mehmet Reşat Özarda, Turkish MP for Aydın (1961–65)(1965–69)
- Afet Özcafer, Clerk of the TRNC Assembly
- Kudret Özersay, leader of the HP (2016–20); Deputy Prime Minister of Northern Cyprus (2018–20)
- Özker Özgür, Deputy Prime Minister of Northern Cyprus (1994–95); leader of CTP (1976–96)
- Hüseyin Özgürgün, Prime Minister of Northern Cyprus (2010; 2016–18)
- Canan Öztoprak, founding member of the Cyprus Conflict Resolution Trainers Group
- Hüseyin Öztoprak, former TRNC Minister of Agriculture
- Kıbrıslı Mehmed Emin Pasha, Grand Vizier of the Ottoman Empire (1854; 1859; and 1860–61)
- Kâmil Pasha, Grand Vizier of the Ottoman Empire (1885-1891; 1895; 1908–09; and 1912–13)
- Raşit Pertev, Secretary of the International Fund for Agricultural Development (2013–present)
- Ali Pilli, TRNC Minister of Health (2019–present)
- Ersan Saner, Prime Minister of Northern Cyprus (2020–2021)
- Ali Vefa Seyhanlı, Turkish MP for Antalya (1920–23), one of the founding members of the Turkish Parliament, (born in Famagusta)
- Abbas Sınay, member of CTP
- Sibel Siber, first female prime minister of Northern Cyprus (2013–18)
- Ferdi Sabit Soyer, Prime Minister of Northern Cyprus (2005–09)
- Natalie Suleyman, Australian-born politician; the first Turkish Cypriot, and the first Muslim woman, to be elected to the Victorian Parliament (Turkish Cypriot parents)
- Hasan Taçoy, Minister of Public Works and Transport (2009–10 and 2014–15)
- Mehmet Ali Talat, President of Northern Cyprus (2005–10)
- Oya Talat, President of the Patriotic Women's Union
- Ersin Tatar, President of Northern Cyprus (2020–present)
- Alparslan Türkeş, founder of the Nationalist Movement Party, Turkish MP for Ankara and Adana (1965–69)(1969–1973)(1973–77)(1977–1980) (born in Nicosia)
- Mustafa Yektaoğlu, member of CTP
- Özkan Yorgancıoğlu, Prime Minister of Northern Cyprus (2013–15)
- Ahmet Uzun, TRNC Minister of Finance (2004–09)

== Religion ==
- Mehmet Adil, Syrian-born Sufi; leader of the worldwide Naqshbandi Sufi order (Turkish Cypriot father)
- Mehmet Nazım Adil, Sufi sheikh and spiritual leader of the Naqshbandi tariqa
- Fatih Alev, Danish-born imam (Turkish Cypriot parents)
- Abdul Kerim al-Qubrusi, Turkish Cypriot-born American Sufi sheikh
- Ramadan Güney, Turkish Cypriot-born British community leader; founder of the first Turkish mosque in the UK (Shacklewell Lane Mosque); and former owner of the UK's largest cemetery Brookwood Cemetery (Turkish Cypriot origin)
- Şule Yüksel Şenler, Turkish-born activist; the first woman to introduce the hijab concept to urban daily life in modern Turkey (Turkish Cypriot parents)

== Royalty ==
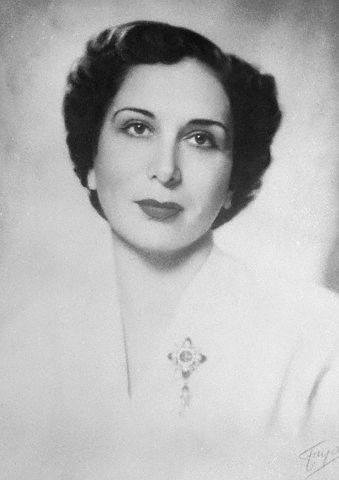
Zein al-Sharaf bint Jamil

- Zein al-Sharaf bint Jamil, Egyptian-born Queen of Jordan (granddaughter of the Ottoman Cypriot governor Shakir Pasha)
  Her children include:
  - Hussein bin Talal, King of Jordan
  - Muhammad bin Talal, Jordanian prince
  - Hassan bin Talal, Jordanian prince
  - Basma bint Talal, Jordanian princess

== Sports ==
- Serdal Adalı, the chairman of Beşiktaş (Turkish Cypriot father)

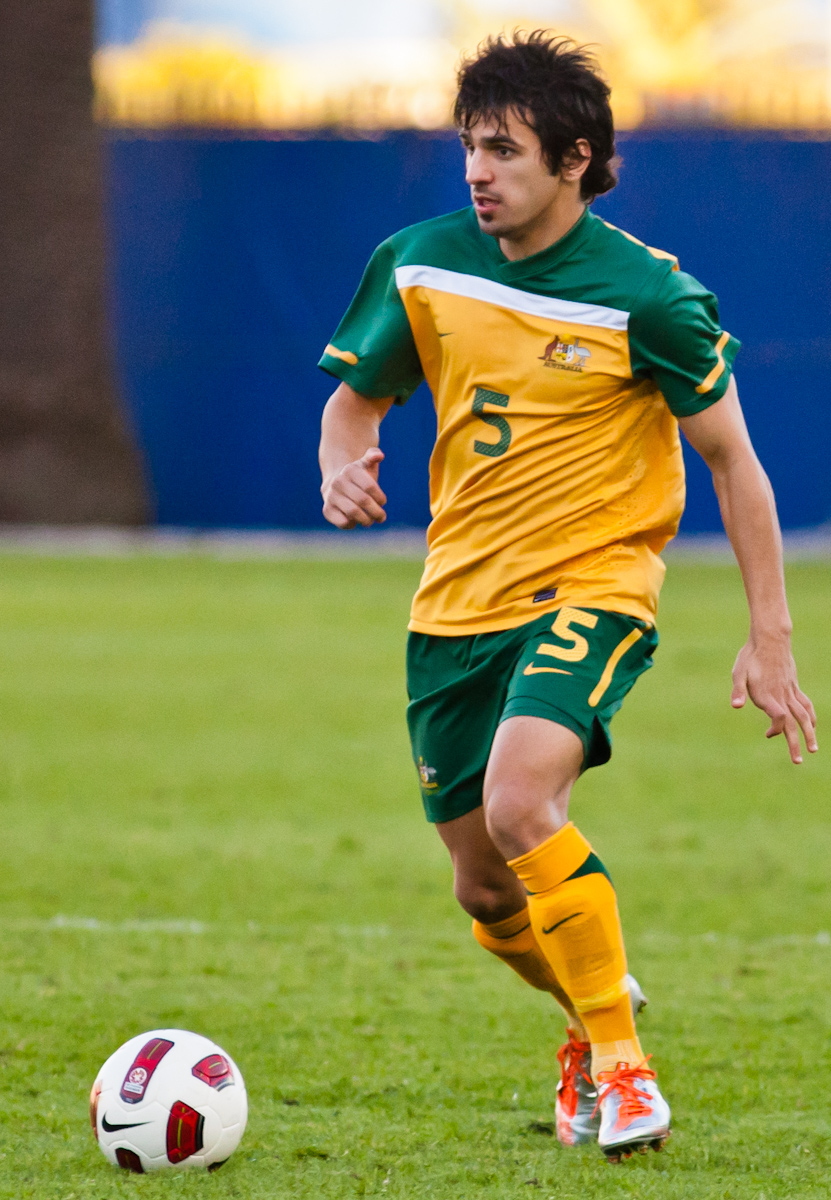
Aziz Behich

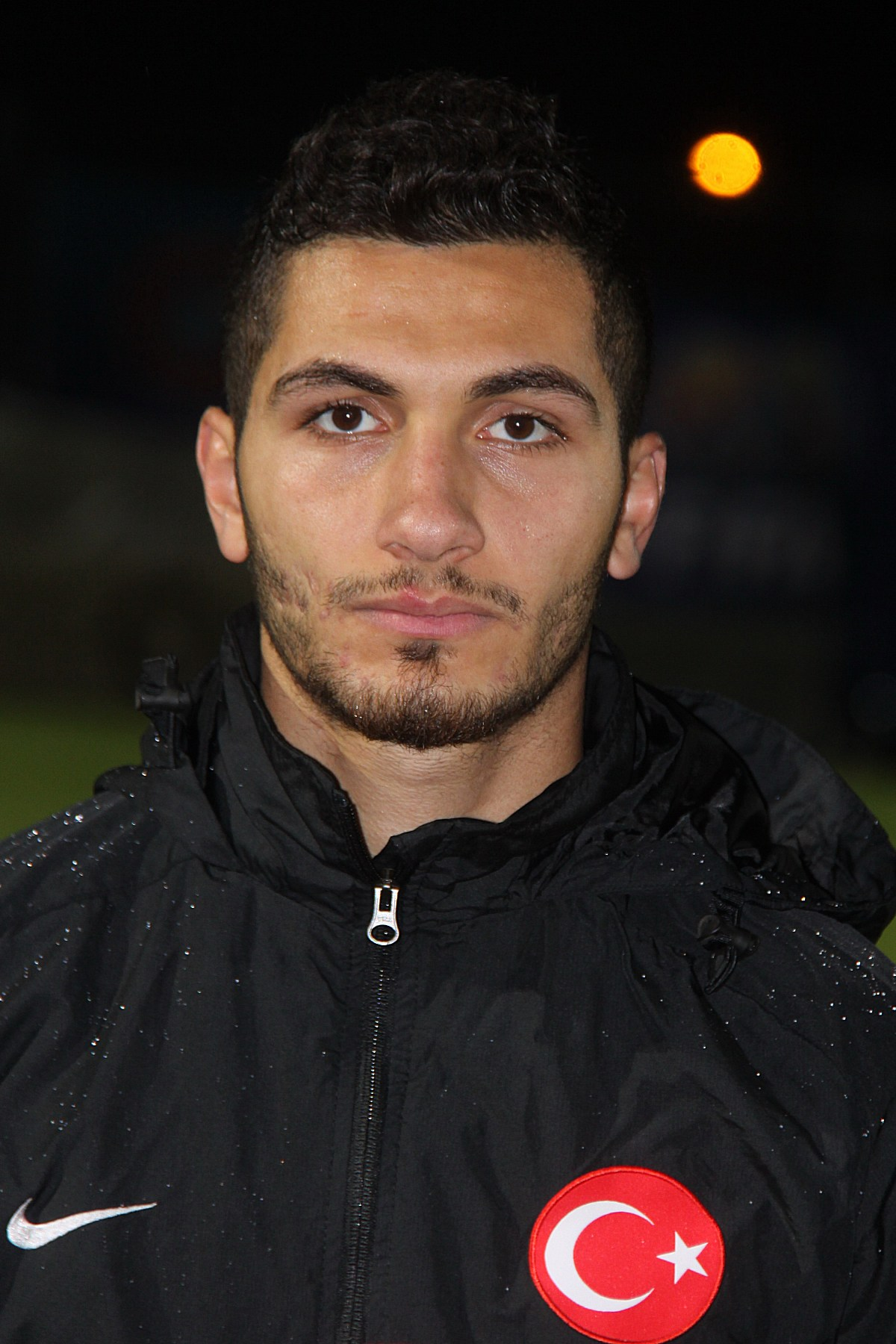
Kamil Çörekçi

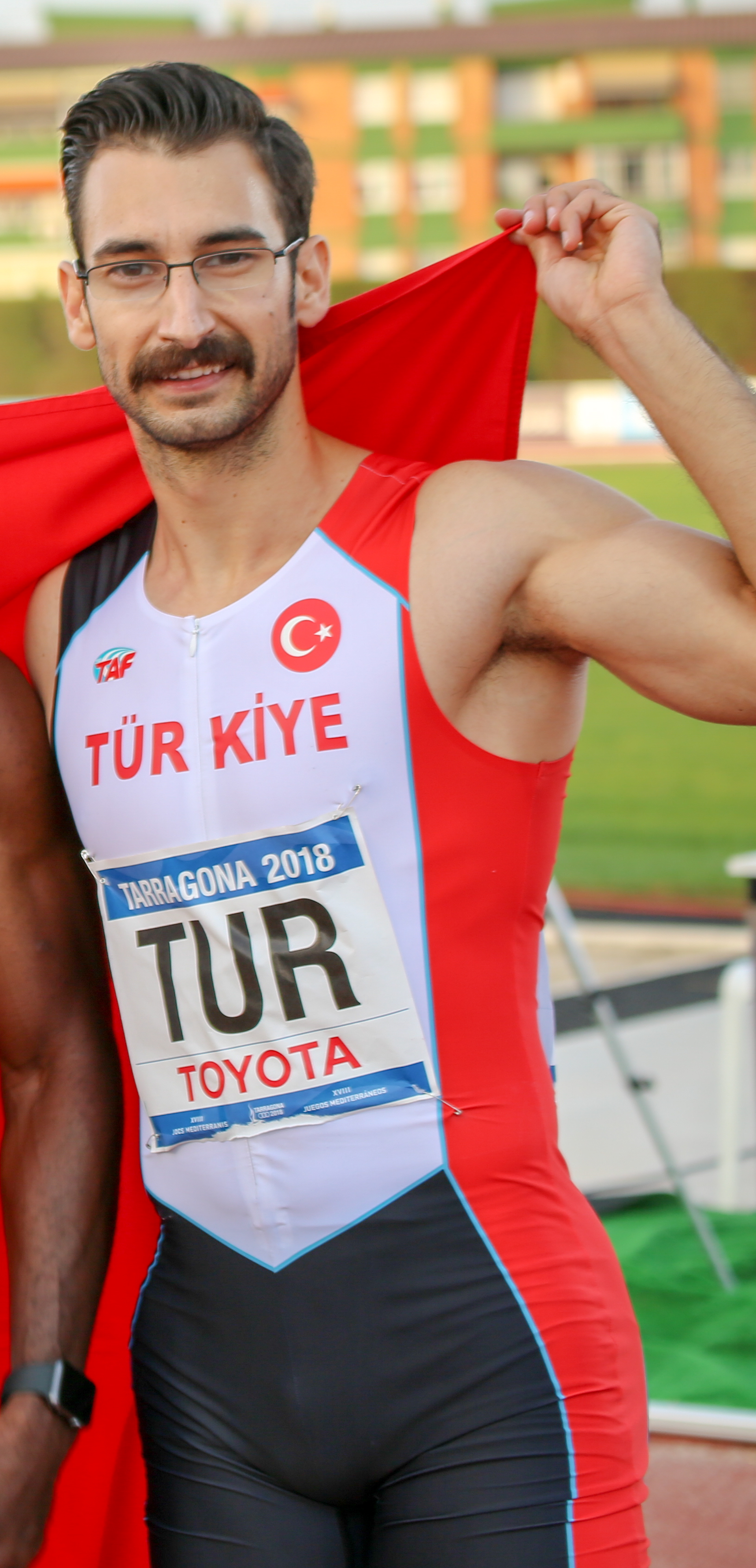
Yiğitcan Hekimoğlu

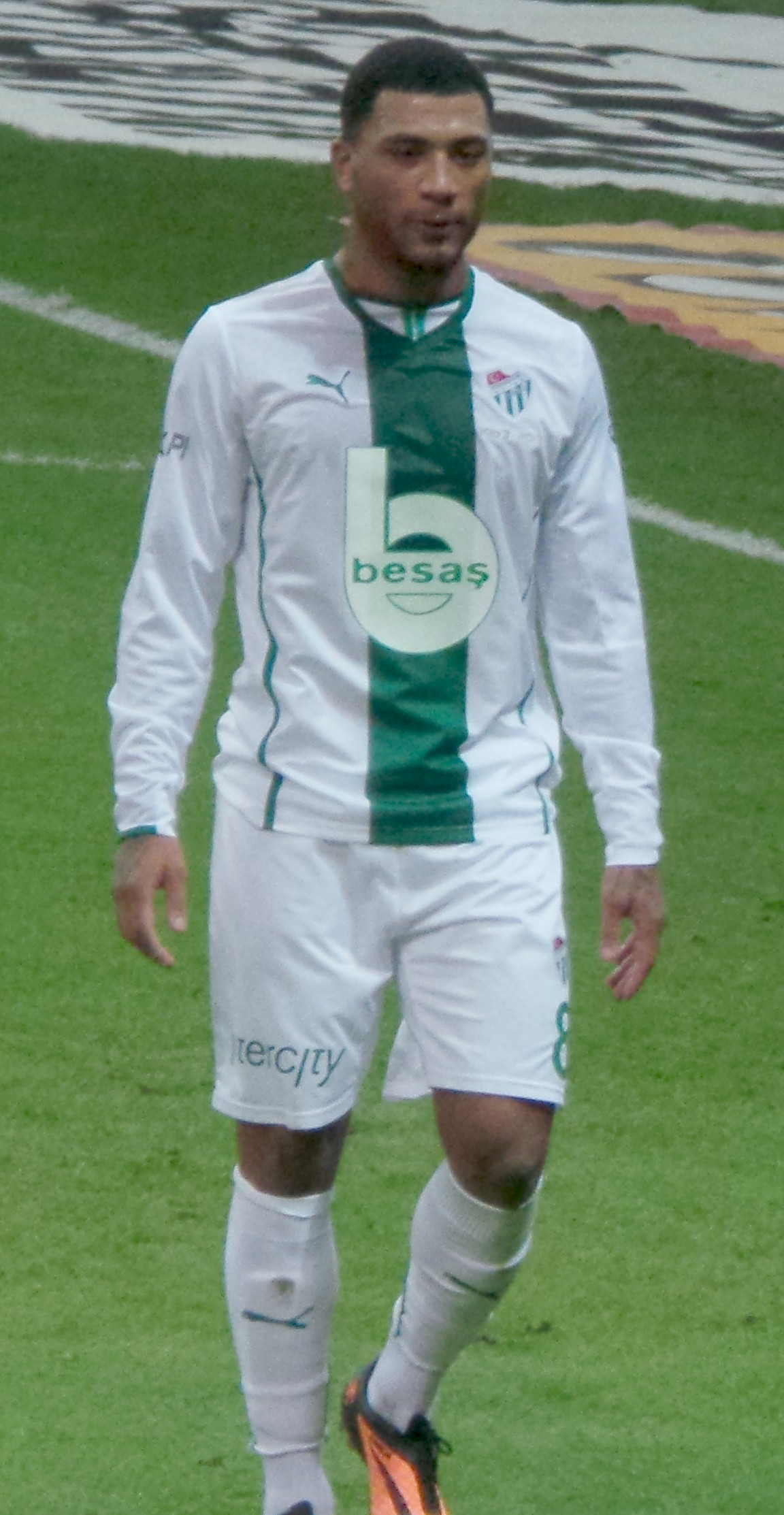
Colin Kazim-Richards

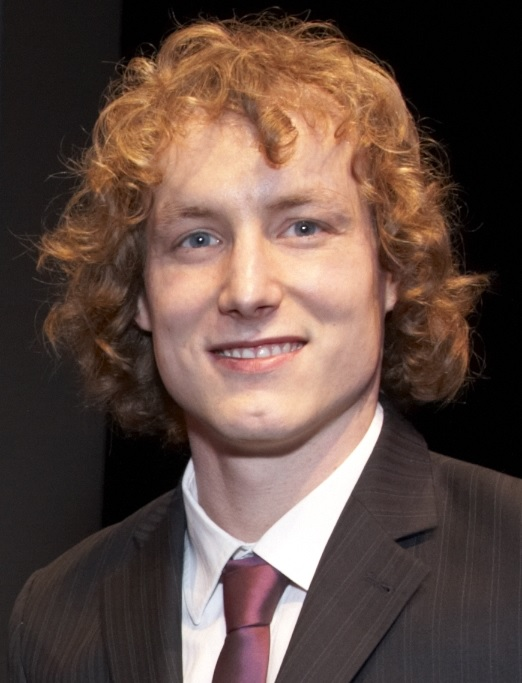
Dervis Konuralp

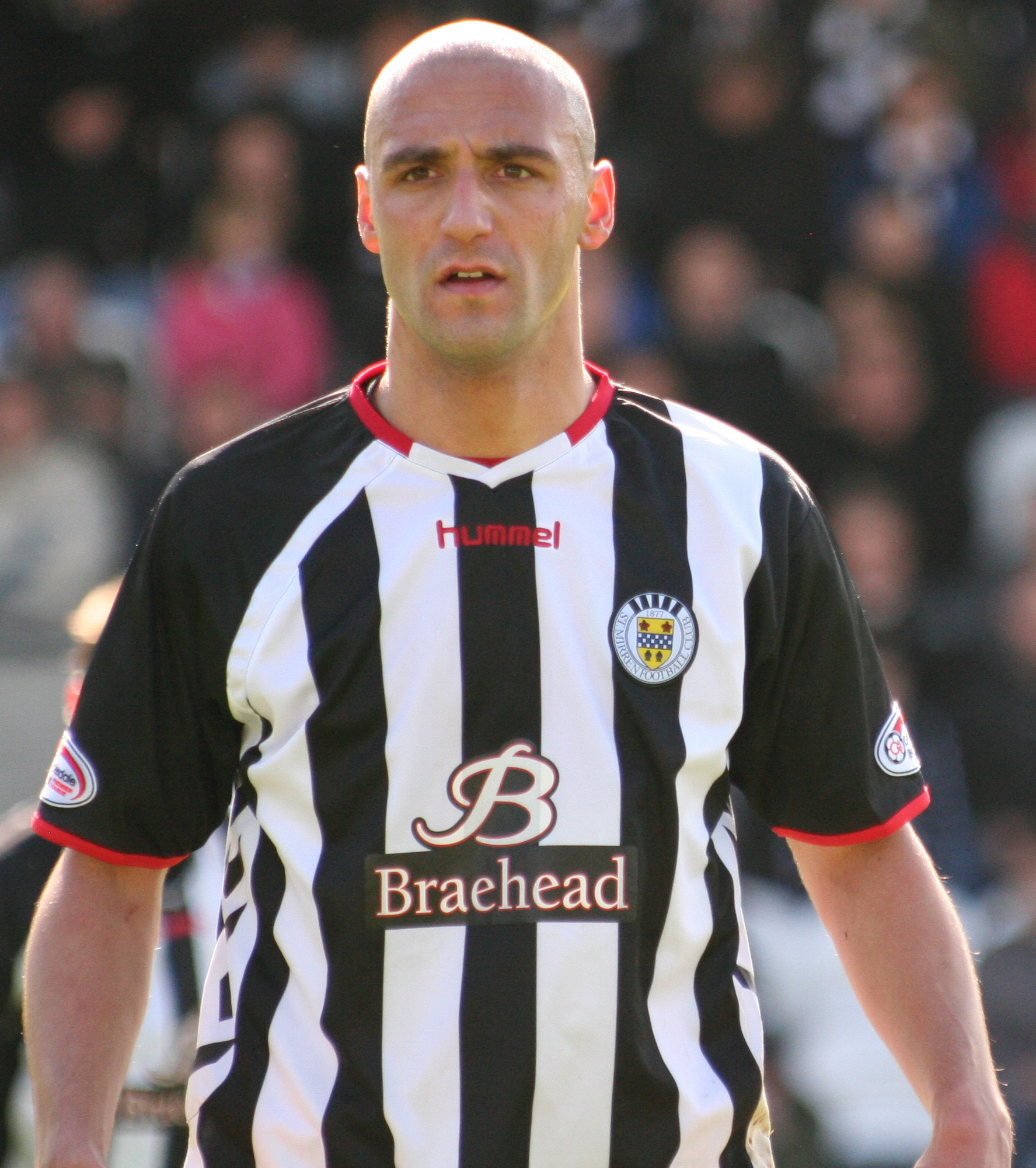
Billy Mehmet

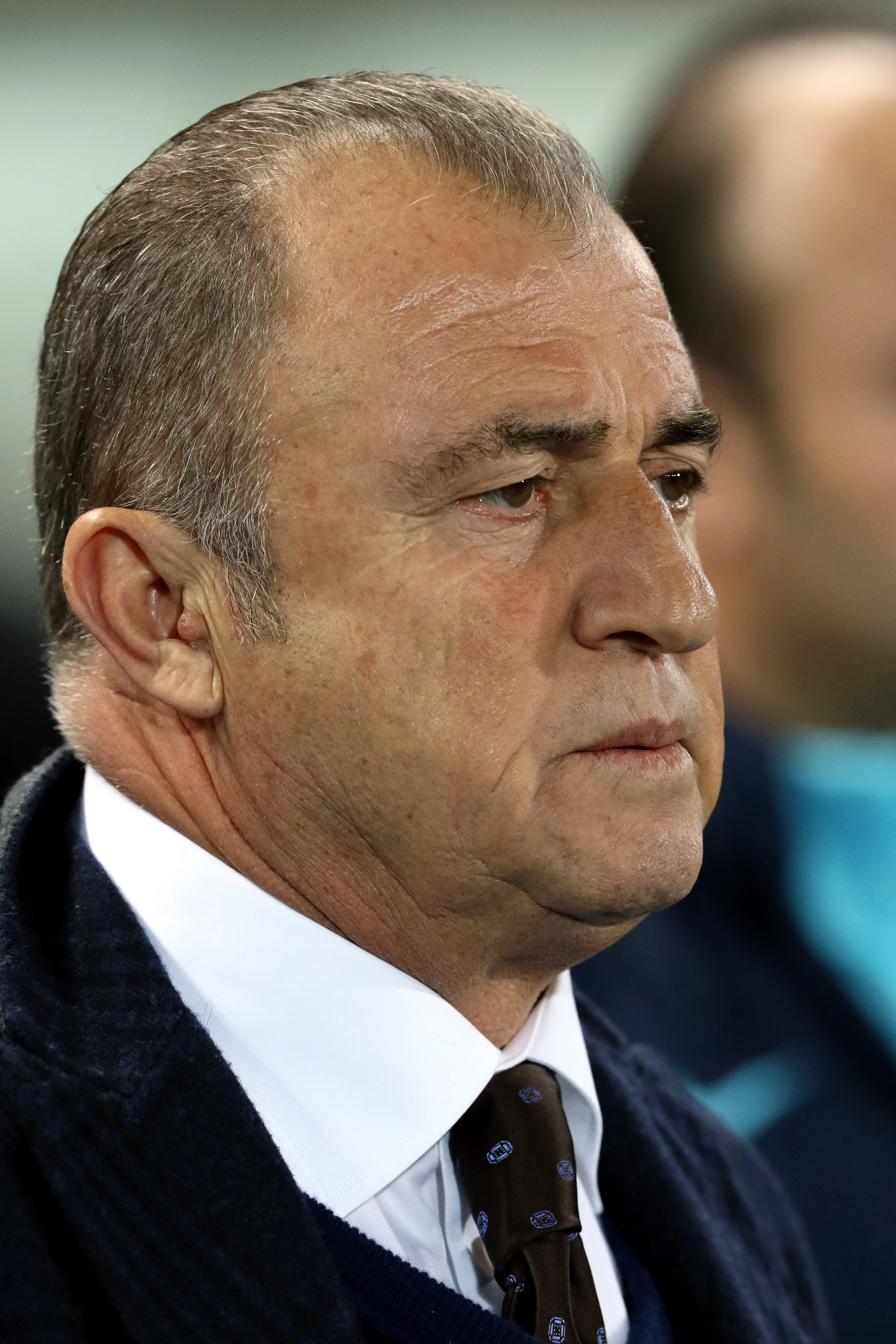
Fatih Terim

- Mete Adanır, football player
- Ümit Aktül, football coach
- Emin Atabek, football player
- Jack Aziz, Australian-born football player (Turkish Cypriot origin)
- Aziz Behich, Australian-born football player (Turkish Cypriot parents)
- Ayten Berkalp, volleyball player
- Adam Booth, British-born boxing trainer and manager of David Haye (Turkish Cypriot parents)
- Zehra Borazancı, female football player
- Rhian Brewster, British-born football player (Turkish Cypriot mother)
- Ulaş Candanal, football player
- Hamis Çakır, football player
- Ayşe Çetinkaya, female football player
- Kamil Ahmet Çörekçi, British-born Turkish football player (Turkish Cypriot parents)
- Toygar Davulcu, football coach
- Çiler Demirtay, female football player
- Serhat Deniz, sports manager and coach
- Mejdi Direniş, football player
- Jaden Dixon, British-born football player (Turkish Cypriot mother)
- Yasin Doğan, football player
- Murat Erdoğan, British-born football player (Turkish Cypriot parents)
- Erden Eruç, Turkish Cypriot-born American adventurer; first person to complete an entirely solo and human-powered circumnavigation of the Earth
- Melisa Filis, football player (Turkish Cypriot origin)
- Erten Gazi, Turkish Cypriot born-basketball player for Fenerbahçe
- Hakan Hayrettin, British-born football player (Turkish Cypriot parents)
- Yiğitcan Hekimoğlu, Turkish Cypriot-born Turkish sprinter
- Halle Houssein, football player (Turkish Cypriot origin)
- Kemal Izzet, British-born football player (Turkish Cypriot father)
- Muzzy Izzet, British-born Turkish football player (Turkish Cypriot father)
- İzzet Kaçmaz, football player and coach
- Jem Karacan, British-born Turkish football player (Turkish Cypriot father)
- Şerif Ogan Karabıyıklı, female football player
- Ahmet Karlankuş, football player
- Colin Kazim-Richards, British-born Turkish football player (Turkish Cypriot mother)
- Dervis Konuralp, British-born Paralympic swimmer (Turkish Cypriot father)
- Billy Mehmet, British-born Irish and TRNC football player (Turkish Cypriot father)
- Dave Mehmet, British-born football player (Turkish Cypriot parents)
- Deniz Mehmet, British-born football player (Turkish Cypriot parents)
- Tarkan Mustafa, British-born football player (Turkish Cypriot parents)
- Önder Mutsuzlar, football coach
- Ahmet Ogan, coach and sports manager
- Reşat Oğuz (atlet), athlete
- Yılmaz Orhan, Turkish Cypriot-born American football player
- Levent Osman, Australian-born football player (Turkish Cypriot parents)
- Erhun Oztumer, British-born football player (Turkish Cypriot parents)
- İrfan Özbay, football player
- Kenan Özer, football player
- Bayram Özgün, football player
- Ahmet Patterson, British-born boxer (Turkish Cypriot father)
- Meliz Redif, female sprinter/track runner
- Omer Riza, British-born football player (Turkish Cypriot parents)
- Başak Ruso, female football player
- Mustafa Salk, football player
- Danis Salman, Turkish Cypriot-born British football player
- Memduh Sarıoğlu, football player
- Buse Savaşkan, athlete
- Salih Say, football player
- Esin Sonay, football player
- Fatih Terim, Turkish-born football player; former manager of the Turkey national football team (1993–96; 2005–09; and 2013–17) and former manager of Galatasaray (Turkish Cypriot father)
- Acelya Toprak, British-born martial artist; youngest winner at the European Judo Championships (Turkish Cypriot parents)
- Tamer Tuna, British-born football player (Turkish Cypriot parents)
- Mustafa Vardi, football player
- Özel Vasıf, tennis player
- Fatima Whitbread, British-born javelin thrower (Turkish Cypriot mother)
- İbrahim Yavuz, wheelchair basketball player for Fenerbahçe and the senior Turkish national team.
- Halil Zorba, British-born weightlifter (Turkish Cypriot parents)

== Others ==
- Patrick Azimkar, British-born soldier killed during the Massereene Barracks shooting in 2009 (Turkish Cypriot father)
- Arifs, British criminal gang (Turkish Cypriot origin)
