= Derviş Ali Kavazoğlu =

- Born: April 4, 1924; Peristeronopigi, Famagusta, Cyprus
- Died: April 11, 1965 (aged 41); Goshi, Larnaca, Cyprus

Derviş Ali Kavazoğlu (April 4, 1924 – April 11, 1965) was a Turkish Cypriot member of the left wing AKEL party who was killed in 1965 by Turkish ultranationalist paramilitary group TMT.

== Assassination ==
Kavazoğlu and Kostas Misiaoulis were proponents of peace between the Turkish Cypriot and Greek Cypriot communities on the island of Cyprus during the period of intercommunal violence. Whilst both were members of AKEL, Misiaoulis was also a PEO trade union official. The two were shot to death on April 11, 1965, when they were ambushed on the Nicosia – Larnaca road, near the village of Goshi. Both are held as symbols of Greek-Turkish solidarity and were commemorated in an event attended by Greek Cypriot President Dimitris Christofias in 2008.

== See also ==
- Fazıl Önder
- Ayhan Hikmet
- AKEL
- İnkılâpçı
- PEO
- TMT
- Cypriot intercommunal violence

- Christakis Vanezos: Derviş Ali Kavazoğlu, Λευκωσία - Christakis Vanezos: Derviş Ali Kavazoğlu, by Galeri Kultur Yeyinlari, Lefkosa
