= Pembe Marmara =

Turkish Cypriot poet

Pembe Marmara (25 December 1925 – 31 January 1984) was a Turkish Cypriot poet. She was one of the most important Turkish Cypriot poets of the 1940s and one of the earliest female Turkish Cypriot poets. Her poetry was influenced heavily by the Garip movement in Turkey and she wrote works of satire in free verse. Her poetry is also distinct from the nationalism characterising Turkish Cypriot poetry of her time, instead focusing more on the experience of being a Turkish Cypriot.

== Life ==
Marmara was born into a wealthy family called the "Saraç" family, who traced their lineage back to Anatolia at the time of the 1571 Ottoman conquest of Cyprus. Her father, Yusuf Saraç Hüseyin, was known as "Grocer Hasan". Marmara started her educational life at the Yenicami Pre-School, after which she enrolled in the Ayasofya Girls' Primary School and Victoria Girls' High School. She then studied at the Teachers' College and became a primary school teacher working at the Ayasofya Primary School.

She initially wrote under aliases such as Nevin Nale, Gülen Gaye, Lafazan Meçhul ("the unknown talkative"), Funda and Fırtına, and even as such experienced a great fear of persecution. This was because of her father and the patriarchal society seeing women's poetry as scandalous and promiscuous at the time and the ban of the British colonial government on civil servants publishing written work, which would cost her her job. According to her sister, their father, having read at the newspaper one of Marmara's poems that she wrote under an alias, broke into their home exasperated, saying that he had read a poem written by a woman and "the sky would fall onto their heads" as "there was no shame left in [their] women".

Her poetry gradually became well-known in Cyprus and Turkey with her poems published in the journals I. ve II. Demet Şiir Seçkinleri in Cyprus and Yedigün in Turkey. However, the vast majority of her poems were published in Turkish Cypriot newspapers between 1944 and 1958. She was one of the few prominent women in the Turkish Cypriot society in the 1940s, the others being poet Urkiye Mine Balman, musicians Kamran Aziz and Türkan Aziz and businessperson Vedia Barut.

She soon became pen pals with poets in Turkey. With Ümit Yaşar Oğuzcan, one of these pen pals, she developed a romantic affair that each expressed through their poems. They then got engaged through a ring that Oğuzcan sent hidden in a book that he sent her. Marmara's father was outraged at the prospect but had to yield when his daughter stopped eating, sending her brother to Istanbul to see Oğuzcan. However, her brother came with a stark refusal of the prospects, saying that Oğuzcan was "stout and a stutterer". This psychologically devastated Marmara and influenced her poetry.

She later married Sedat Baker, a psychiatrist, with whom they moved to Istanbul for some time. In 1960, her son, Ulus Baker, who would later become a renowned sociologist, was born. The couple then became separated and Baker was murdered in Kyrenia because of a forbidden love affair. Marmara, heartbroken, moved back to Istanbul with her son. She later was diagnosed with cancer and returned to Cyprus. She lived at a house on Abdi Çavuş Street in the walled city of Nicosia, with which she became associated, and died there on 31 January 1984.

== Poetry ==
Pembe Marmara belonged to the "40s generation of poems" of Turkish Cypriot literature. Whilst being traditionally grouped together with her other Turkish Cypriot poets as a "romantik hececi" ("romantic syllabist"), she had a distinct style more influenced by the Garip movement of poets in Turkey led by Orhan Veli Kanık. Marmara widely used free verse in her poetry. According to Tamer Öncül, who calls Marmara "one of the most qualified poets of the period", Marmara stayed away from the other "romantic hececiler" and the prominent Turkish Cypriot poets of her time, who wrote in the nationalist publication Çığ, and wrote ironic and satirical poems on social issues in free verse, with evidence of inspiration by the Garip movement and Nazım Hikmet. Öncül writes that Marmara "seems to have solved the question of identity" in that her poetry is "not a tool for chauvinism" or for "nationalistic sermons" and the subjects of her poems are her own Turkish Cypriot people. However, according to Öncül, later in her literary career, after a break from writing, her style resembles more of the "hececiler" that she stayed away from. Talât Sait Halman points to a conflict between the "periphery", her Cypriot homeland and a distinct line of thought associated with it, and the "metropolis", a line of thought that would be more palatable for literary magazines in Istanbul in Marmara's writing. Neriman Cahit calls Marmara the poet with the "largest amount of Cypriotness" in her writing among the prominent quartet of the female writers of her generation, consisting of Pembe Marmara, Urkiye Mine Balman, Necla Salih Suphi and Engin Gönül (Emine Oktan). According to Cahit, Marmara is one of the first Turkish Cypriot poets that wrote satire whilst being concerned with both a personal and a communal outlook. Cahit further writes that her poems always carry "a deep sensitivity" as well as love, fear and pain at times, and that over time, as she got overwhelmed by social expectations and traditional values, her focus shifted from a communal to a personal one. Her poems closely reflect the progression of her life. Some poems of hers are on her love affair with Oğuzcan.

İlknur Önol Yaşar claims that Marmara was influenced by Dante Alighieri in terms of her outlook on her life and death, evidenced by the line "There will be a journey to beyond this world" in her 1951 poem "Yolculuk" ("Journey"). A critical article by Hikmet Dizdaroğlu published in Turkish magazine Oğuz in 1952 on Turkish Cypriot poetry stated that Marmara uses language "flawlessly", and words that show some "alienation" in Engin Gönül's poetry "fit in perfectly" in Marmara's poetry. The article likened Marmara's style to Halide Nusret Zorlutuna's "dreamy lyricism", stating that her poem "Bahar" resembles Zorlutuna's poem "Git Bahar!".

Marmara only has one book, Pembe Marmara – Şiirler, a collection of her poems from 1945 onwards posthumously published in 1986 by her sister. Marmara's work has been praised by Turkish literary historian Nihat Sami Banarlı. On poetry, Marmara herself said "Poetry is only poetry when it washes our soul in a rain of meaning and emotion, I do not distinguish between poems with rhyme or free verse poems but I am a bit conservative. I look for emotion, meaning and sense, music in poetry".
