= 2017 in Northern Cyprus =

- Decades: 1990s; 2000s; 2010s; 2020s
- See also: Other events of 2017; Timeline of Northern Cypriot history

Events from the year 2017 in Northern Cyprus

== Incumbents ==
- President: Mustafa Akıncı
- Prime Minister: Hüseyin Özgürgün
- Speaker of Parliament: Sibel Siber

== Events ==
- Two years of talks between Nicos Anastasiades and Mustafa Akinci finally paid off when the biggest conference on Cyprus since Burgenstock in 2004 was called for July, with a second chance to secure a settlement at Crans-Montana, also in Switzerland.

== Deaths ==
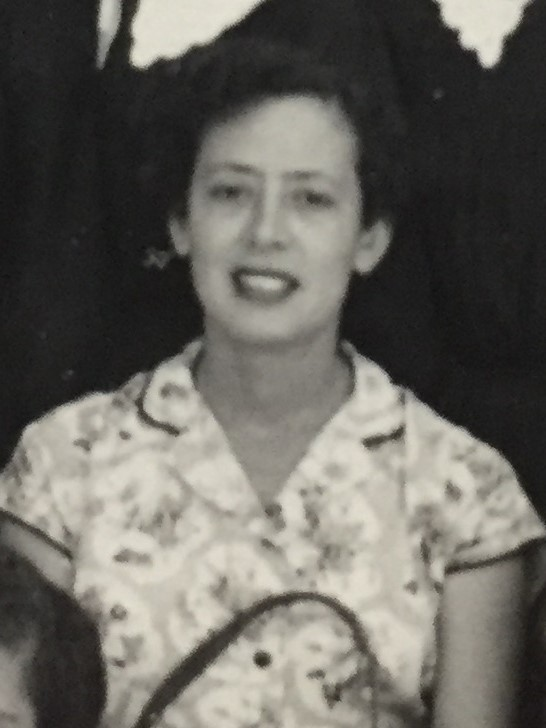
Kamran Aziz

- 7 March – Kamran Aziz, musician and pharmacist (b. 1922).
