= Kamer Yusuf =

Turkish Cypriot pharmacist

- Born: 27 December 1916
- Died: 5 March 1999 (aged 82)
- Occupation: pharmacist
- Years active: 1944–1976
- Known for: one of the first Turkish Cypriot women pharmacists
- Notable work: founded pharmaceutical warehouse in northern Nicosia
- Parents: Yusuf Ziya Efendi (father); Fazile Hanım (mother)

Kamer Yusuf (27 December 1916 – 5 March 1999) was a Turkish Cypriot pharmacist. As one of the first Turkish Cypriot women pharmacists, she founded and administered the pharmaceutical warehouse of the general hospital in North Nicosia.

== Life ==
Yusuf was born on 27 December 1916 to Yusuf Ziya Efendi (father) and Fazile Hanım (mother). After completing her primary education and high school, she started to work at the Nicosia general hospital as a technician. She then took up positions in the Department of Health, which saw her participate in the campaign for the eradication of malaria in Cyprus, led by Mehmet Aziz. She got her pharmacist's license from the state-offered courses at the general hospital in 1944. She opened a pharmacy in Nicosia in 1945 and started working as a pharmacist in the hospital in 1960. As Nicosia was divided in two due to the events of Bloody Christmas in 1963, a new pharmaceutical warehouse had to be opened in the hospital in the northern sector. Yusuf was the founder of this warehouse, and she administered it until her retirement in 1976. She died in Nicosia on 5 March 1999.
