= Pambis Kyritsis =

Cypriot trade unionist (born 1958)

Pambis Kyritsis (born 17 June 1958; Greek: Πάμπης Κυρίτσης) is a Cypriot trade union leader and former politician.

Born in Larnaca, Kyritsis studied at the University of Macedonia, where he was active in the student movement, and also co-ordinated supporters of the Progressive Party of Working People (AKEL) in Greece. From 1990 to 1992, he was the general secretary of the United Democratic Youth Organisation. He then joined the executive council of AKEL, heading its local government section. In 1995, he became executive secretary of the Pancyprian Federation of Labour (PEO), and then in 1999 its general secretary.

At the 2006 Cypriot legislative election, Kyritsis was elected in Larnaca for AKEL. There, he chaired the Parliamentary Committee on Labour and Social Insurance. He lost his seat at the 2011 Cypriot legislative election.

Kyritsis stood down from his trade union posts in 2021. In 2022, he was elected as general secretary of the World Federation of Trade Unions.

Trade union offices
Preceded by Abraham Antoniou	General Secretary of the Pancyprian Federation of Labour; 1999–2021	Succeeded by Sotiroula Charalambous
Preceded by George Mavrikos	General Secretary of the World Federation of Trade Unions; 2022–present	Succeeded by Incumbent
