= Turkish Cypriot Community Awards =

Annual awards

- Date: March 9, 2019
- Venue: Regency Banqueting Suite, London
- Country: United Kingdom

Highlights
- Young Community Achiever: Huriye Çiftcioğlu
- Male Community Achiever: Erim Metto
- Female Community Achiever: Türkay Hadji-Filippou
- Charity of the Year: Turkish Cypriot Community Association
- Overseas Charity of the Year: Cyprus Islamic Association
- Website: turkishcypriotcommunityawards.com

The Turkish Cypriot Community Awards was launched in 2018. It recognises the impact that members of the Turkish Cypriot charity sector have made in the United Kingdom. The awards are voted for by members of the community and presented by dignitaries at an event gala including Tufan Erhürman Prime Minister of Northern Cyprus. The first awards event were presented in 2019. In 2020, due to the outbreak of COVID-19 the Turkish Cypriot Community Awards did not proceed beyond nominations.

== Winners and nominees ==
=== 2019 Winners and nominees ===
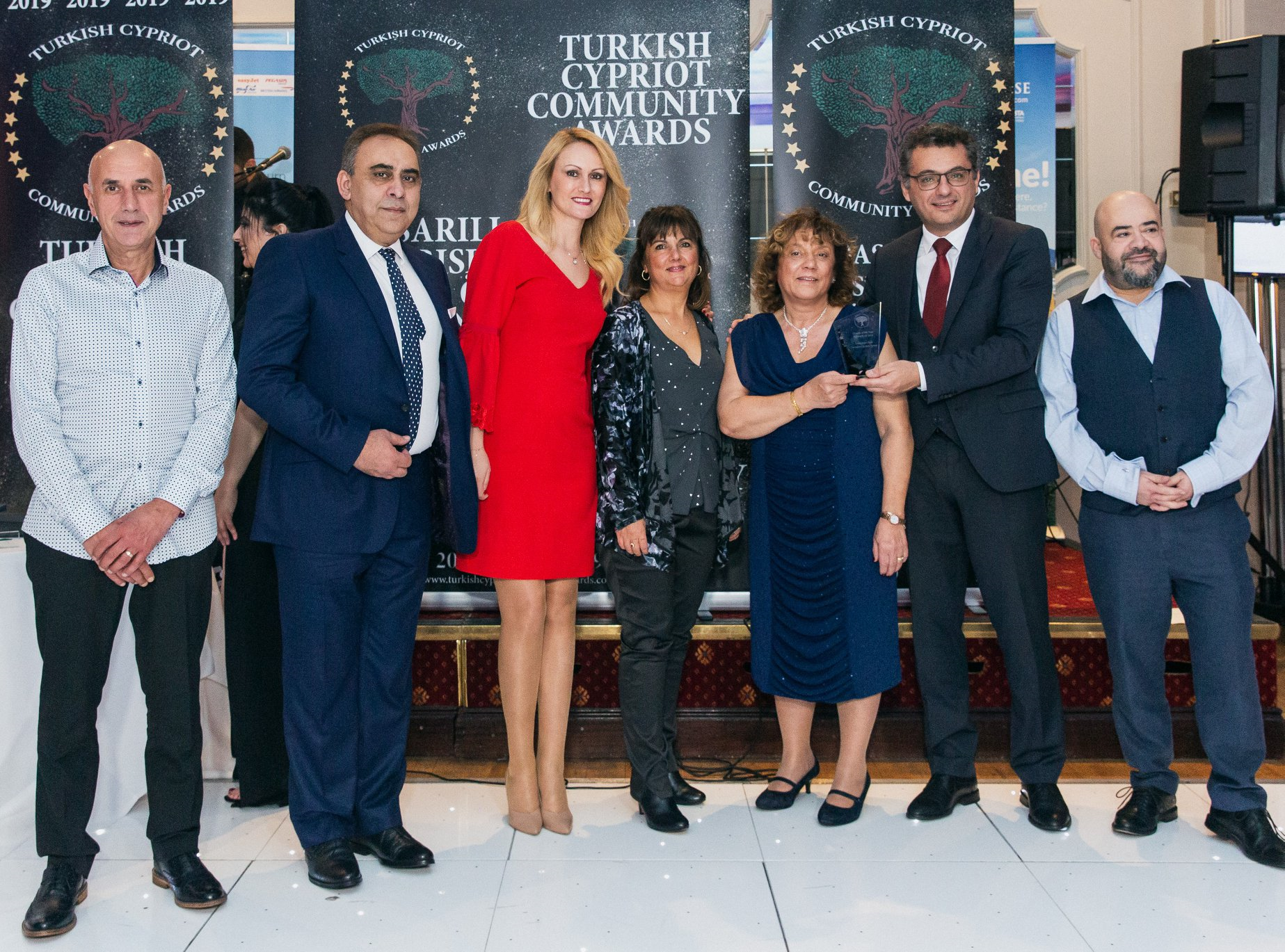

Young Community Achiever	Male Community Achiever
Winner - Huriye Çiftcioğlu; Runner Up – Mehmet Gazioğlu; Bayram Çubuk; Nafiya Horozoğlu; Tolga Özküm	Winner - Erim Metto; Runner Up – Husayn Hashim El Bakayi; Dr Teoman Sırrı MBE; Ahmet Havalı; Esat Mustafa
Female Community Achiever	Charity of the Year
Winner - Türkay Hadji-Filippou; Runner Up – Tünay Hussein; Baroness Meral Hussein-Ece OBE; Sevtap Kemal; Arife Retvan	Winner - Turkish Cypriot Community Association; Runner Up – Tottenham Park Cemetery Action Group; Limasollular Derneği; Turkish Language Culture & Education Consortium UK; İkinci Bahar
Overseas Charity of the Year	Lifetime Achievement
Winner - Cyprus Islamic Association; Runner Up – Limasollular Derneği UK; Inner Wheel; Cağdaş Music Group; Mağusa İnsiyatifi	Winner - Sevtap Kemal; Runner Up – Osman Balıkçıoğlu; Akile Işın; Ertanç Hidayettin; Yaşar İsmailoğlu
Special Recognition listing
Kelami Dedezade 1952 - 2018; Dr. Tözün İsa 1956 - 2015; Hasan Raif 1948 - 2017; Turgut Esendağlı 1963 - 2017; Hulus İbrahim 1931 - 2018; Dr. İsfendiyar Tuncer 1927 - 2016

=== 2020 nominees ===
Young Community Achiever	Community Achievement Award (Male)
Bayram Cubuk; Gulay Ermiya; Nafiya Horoz; Ozel Sari	Hussain Hashim Bakayi; Erim Metto; Mehmet Mimoglu; Ibrahim Mani
Community Achievement Award (Female)	Charity of the Year
Munever Borova; Yasemin Baca; Arife Retvan; Hamide Sari	Turkish Cypriot Community Association; CATI; Turkish Football Federation; Turkish Language Culture & Education Consortium UK
Lifetime achievement Award	Contribution to the Arts
Awardee - Tevik Zekai	Osman Balikcioglu; Ertanch Hiddayettin; Erdogan Baca; Sumer Erek
Contribution to Education and youth	Contribution to Health
Nuriye Mertcan; Sevtap Kemal; Turker Cakici; Ertanc Hidayettin	Dr Teoman Sirri; Dr Mek Mehmet Yesil; Dr Akan Efe; Dr Tahsin Bilginer
Special Recognition listing
Aysin Yilmaz; Ilker Kilic; Nurten Mehmet; Mustafa Findik; Ersoy Mithat; Yasar Halim
