= Fazıl Önder =

- Born: 1926; Omorphita, Nicosia, Cyprus
- Died: May 24, 1958 (aged 31–32); Nicosia, Cyprus
- Occupation: Journalist

Fazıl Önder (1926 – 1958) was a Turkish Cypriot journalist who was assassinated.

== Biography ==
Fazıl Önder was born in Omorphita in 1926. He completed primary school, but was unable to attend secondary school for financial reasons. Thereafter, along with his brother Cemal, he embarked on an apprenticeship in a saddle shop. After the completion of his apprenticeship, he founded a saddle shop of his own with a business partner.

From 1949 onwards, he signed up for membership to various trade unions, including the Pancyprian Federation of Labour. In 1951, he started working at the Turkish Literature Club (Turk Edebiyat Kulup). British-educated lawyer Ayhan Hikmet, along with Ahmet Malyo, Derviş Ali Kavazoğlu, Mehmet Edisoğlu, and Önder, had created this group to further educate themselves in politics, economics, and ideology, as well as encourage the spread of socialism to members and non-members alike through their activities. The organisation also served as a hub for people to be able to listen to Radio Moscow broadcasts, where Nâzım Hikmet was then living in exile from his native Turkey.

Önder eventually established a publication called İnkılâpçı (Revolutionary). He was appointed editor, whilst Ahmet Sadi and Kavazoğlu took on columnist roles for the newspaper. İnkılâpçı published articles relevant to the Cypriot working classes and advocated the unity of Greek and Turkish Cypriots, after its fifteenth issue, it was shut down; the publication was cited as a threat to British colonial rule. Önder additionally assisted in the establishment of the Pedagogy Academy and Agriculture School in Cyprus.

== Assassination ==
Önder was assassinated by TMT on 24 May 1958, it is believed that the order to assassinate him came because of the threat of his socialist leanings, as well as his stance against partition, favouring the idea of a united Cyprus.

It has been reported that whilst Önder was initially shot, it was not fatal and the killer blow came when he attempted to overpower one of his assassins; the second member of the party stabbing him in the back during the struggle. His wife, Zehra, and daughter, Ayşe, were not permitted to be at his funeral; only his sister and two other relatives were allowed to attend. His relatives are still unable to confirm if Önder was in fact the individual buried under his name.

== See also ==
- İnkılâpçı
- Pancyprian Federation of Labour
- Progressive Party of Working People
