= Turgay Hilmi =

Turkish Cypriot French horn player

Turgay Hilmi (born in Cyprus ) is a Turkish Cypriot French horn player. He is a former member of the Staatstheater Nürnberg and associate professor of music at the Friedrich-Alexander University, in Erlangen and Nuremberg, Germany. He is also the general manager of Cyprus Art Music and Ballet School.
