= Şule Yüksel Şenler =

Turkish writer and activist (1938–2019)

- Born: Yüksel Şenler; 29 May 1938; Kayseri, Türkiye
- Died: 28 August 2019 (aged 81); Bağcılar, Istanbul, Türkiye
- Resting place: Mihrişah Sultan Complex, Istanbul
- Occupations: Writer, journalist, activist
- Years active: 1952–2018
- Notable work: Huzur Sokağı
- Political party: Justice Party (1962–1968)
- Spouse: Abdullah Kars (m. 1970; div. 1975)

Şule Yüksel Şenler (29 May 1938 – 28 August 2019) (born Yüksel Şenler) was a Turkish writer and journalist. It has been argued that she is one of the key female figures in the rise of Islamism in Turkey and that she was one of its pioneers. She was the designer of so-called "Türban", instead of the traditional "Başörtüsü" that was common in Anatolia for centuries, which she had learned from an Armenian tailor.

Şule Yüksel Şenler holds several firsts. She was the first journalist to wear a headscarf in Türkiye, the first convict to appear in court with a headscarf, and the first speaker with an Islamic identity to address audiences in public spaces such as seminar and conference halls outside of mosques. Additionally, the first discussions about the headscarf in universities were a result of her work and activism.

== Early life ==
Yüksel Şenler was born in Kayseri on 29 May 1938 into a family of Turkish Cypriot origin. She was raised in a highly secular family, where her parents organized ballroom parties at home. In a program on TRT Avaz, Şenler described her that her family follows: "A modern family structure... My mother was a stylish woman with makeup, a hat, and was manicured and pedicured. My father was a modern-minded person but also conservative in his views. Everything required by the times was fulfilled—balls, tea parties, the socially accepted entertainments of that era... We participated in all of them."

At the age of six, she moved to Istanbul with her family. While attending Koca Ragıp Paşa Primary School, her family’s financial situation deteriorated. After her mother suffered a heart attack and fell ill, she had to drop out in the second year of secondary school at the Girls' Educational Institute. She then started working for an Armenian tailor. This experience later encouraged her to design her own headscarf model.

In her youth, she was an avid reader, skilled in sewing and embroidery, and engaged in arts such as painting and music.

Her birth name was Yüksel, but she added "Şule" before her name in her writings to emphasize that she was not a man. Thus, she became known in the literary world as Şule Yüksel.

== Career ==
She began her writing career at the age of 14 by writing stories for Yelpaze magazine. At 21, she stepped into journalism, writing her first columns under the title Duyuşlar in Kadın newspaper. Her brother, Özer Şenler, encouraged her to read the Risale-i Nur collection, which led her to adopt the Islamic practices of wearing a headscarf and performing prayers. After becoming acquainted with figures such as Necip Fazıl Kısakürek and Nurettin Topçu, her interest in and curiosity about Islam deepened.

In 1965, she decided that her appearance no longer aligned with her beliefs and adopted tesettür (Islamic dress). She later began writing for Yeni İstiklal, a newspaper published by Mehmet Şevket Eygi. During the 1950s, she participated in Cyprus protests, demonstrating significant sensitivity toward the Cyprus Issue.

Due to her articles in Yeni İstiklal, legal cases were filed against her. Following a complaint from the Turkish Women's Union, she was accused of anti-secularism. Şenler became one of the pioneers in bringing the headscarf issue into the lives of educated Muslim women. As she toured Anatolia, delivering speeches, she became the center of debates. The discussions intensified when young girls, inspired by her, began covering their heads in a similar manner. As more women followed her example, this new headscarf style became known as Şulebaşı.

In the 1960s, she joined the editorial team of the newly established Bugün newspaper. Alongside her brother, she co-founded Seher Vakti magazine, where she served as editor-in-chief. She created sketches of modern headscarf and overcoat designs, which were well-received by various circles. Female university students embraced these styles as a way to express their desire for education. After the May 27, 1960 coup, Şenler joined the Justice Party (Adalet Partisi), serving as the head of the Bakırköy Youth Branch and the Literature and Culture Department in 1962. Additionally, in 1978, she served as the president of the Idealist Women’s Association (İdealist Hanımlar Derneği).

== Biography ==
One conference caught the attention of then-president Cevdet Sunay, who said "Those behind [the increasing number of] covered women on the streets, will be punished". Şenler responded in a letter to Sunay and was arrested, serving eight months in prison. Şenler wrote for Hür Söz, Yeni İstiklal, and Babıalide Sabah women's pages. After 1980, she wrote for Zaman and Milli Gazete. Şenler's novel Huzur Sokağı ("Peace Street") became a popular TV drama. Despite her advanced age and illness, Şenler continued to occasionally publish articles in newspapers and magazines. She died on 28 August 2019 from a heart attack in Istanbul.

== Selected works ==
- Gençliğin Izdırabı
- Hidayet
- Bize Ne Oldu
- İslam'da ve Günümüzde Kadın
- Duyuşlar
- Her Şey İslam için
- Uygarlığın Gözyaşları
- Huzur Sokağı
- Kız ve Çiçek
- Sağ El
- Bir Bilinçli Öğretmen
- Yılanla Tilki
