= Erim Metto =

British film director and producer (born 1966)

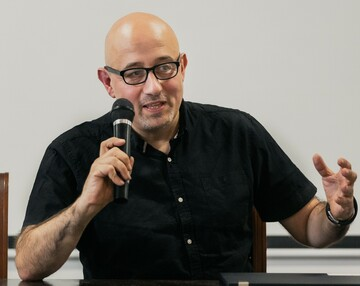
- Born: Erim Hassan; 25 July 1966 (age 60); Enfield, London, England
- Occupations: Filmmaker; Philanthropist
- Years active: 2004 – present
- Children: Yasmin Metto; Jennah Metto

Erim Metto (born: 25 July 1966; Erim Hassan) is a British film director, producer, screenwriter, and business executive. He is the director of the RAaW (film and theatre training company) and CEO of the Turkish Cypriot Community Association. He is the first Turkish Speaking magistrate in the United Kingdom. He was the editor of the book Departures and Arrivals written by Hatice Abdullah. He was a torch bearer for the 2012 London Olympics.

Metto was the recipient of the first Turkish Cypriot Community Achiever Award (Male).

== Early years ==
Metto studies at Greenwich University, following graduation, he started to work for the London Borough of Haringey, and within a year, took the role of Race Equality Officer within the Tottenham constituency, which incorporates Broadwater Farm. He became the first Turkish Speaking Justice of the Peace in 1996, he was a founding member of Enfield Turkish Cypriot Association and has worked with many Turkish organisations over the years raising in excess of £4million pounds for Turkish oriented projects in the UK, Cyprus and Turkey. In 2012 was nominated by various groups in London, ran with The Olympic Torch.

After a hiatus of eight years, Metto assumed the role of CEO at TCCA and has worked on several major projects including the establishment of the Turkish Cypriot Cultural and Arts Festival, The Turkish Cypriot Awards and launch of the Turkish Cypriot Trust UK. Metto spearheaded TCCA to receive a Cache beacon status and a bronze award from the Charity Awards Scheme in 2015. He also led several major international events and was responsible for carrying out the largest study into access of health care within the Turkish and Kurdish communities. Within the field of Project development Metto has developed projects from London to India, including the establishment of an elders' facility in Lefke. Under Metto's leadership, TCCA won the CENTUS top organisation within its first year. In 2019 Metto was awarded Community Achiever of the year at the inaugural Turkish Cypriot Community Awards.

== Career ==
=== Films ===
Metto is a director and producer. He directed or produced five feature-length films, six documentaries, and 21 shorts.

Year	Film	Type	Director	Producer	Screenwriter
1982	Turkish Coffee	Short film	check		check
2004	I Used to live in Cyprus	Documentary	check		
2004	Lockdown	Short Film	check		check
2004	Cultural Need	Short documentary	check		
2004	Flamingo Blues	Feature Film		check	
2004	Cultural Menace	Feature Film	check	check	check
2006	Wartime Life	Short documentary	check	check	check
2011	Invalid Debris	Short film	check		
2013	Detention	Short film	check		
2014	Coma	Feature Film	check	check	check
2014	The Tea, the Warehouse and the Tied Up Russian	Short film	check	check	
2014	Detention	Short film	check		
2015	The Warehouse and the Tied Up Russian	TV Short	check		
2015	Queen of Hearts	Short film	check	check	
2015	Steel Horse	Short film	check	check	
2015	Tracks	Short film	check	check	
2016	Vaccine AG19	Short film	check	check	
2016	Aphorism	Short film	check	check	
2017	Rufus	Short film	check	check	
2018	School	Short film	check	check	check
2018	Amoc	Post-production	check	check	check
2018	Without the Roses	Short film	check	check	

=== Other works ===
In 2012, together with his partner, Robbi Stevens, Metto launched RAaW Ltd. He is also CEO of Turkish Cypriot Community Association.

In 2020, Metto launched the Turkish Cypriot COVID-19 Initiative, a partnership of six organisations that has led in the delivery of services to the most vulnerable within the community, the initiative impacted on the lives of the vulnerable. His work has been commended by receiving the Haringey Hero Award and the recipient of the Bridge Renewal Trust Impact award, for funded contribution towards supporting those vulnerable within our community.
