= İnkılâpçı =

- Type: Weekly newspaper
- Founder: Fazıl Önder
- Political alignment: Left
- Headquarters: Nicosia

İnkılâpçı ("Revolutionary") was a weekly newspaper in Cyprus, closed in 1955.

== History ==
İnkılâpçı (Revolutionary) was first published on 13 September 1955.

The newspaper would be published for 15 weeks, in that period of time being viewed as the voice of the working classes; it published articles regarding all of the important social and economical subjects of those days. But after the British colonial administration declared and emergency situation on 14 December 1955, the newspaper was closed together with Neos Democratis, the daily newspaper of AKEL. Initially AKEL, and then the leftist villager's, socialist youth and women's organizations were outlawed, with many leftists arrested and imprisoned.

As it can be understood from the article under the title "Threat", published in the last issue of İnkılâpçı on 12 December 1955, the then Turkish Cypriot leadership and its underground organisations sent letters of threat to the publishing team of İnkılâpçı, bearing passages such as "stop the publication of İnkılâpçı, you will be killed, your heads will be crushed".

Several years after the closure of the newspaper, its former editor, Fazıl Önder, was assassinated on 24 May 1958 by the TMT. Hulus İbrahim, the co-founder of İnkılâpçı, fled to London to save his life on the same day of Önder's death.
