= Pancyprian Federation of Labour =

Trade union organization

- Pancyprian Federation of Labour
- Παγκύπρια Εργατική Ομοσπονδία (Greek); Tüm Kıbrıs İşçi Federasyonu (Turkish)
- Founded: 1941
- Headquarters: Nicosia, Cyprus
- Location: Cyprus
- Members: 68,100
- General Secretary: Sotiroulla Charalambous
- Key people: Pambis Kyritsis, WFTU General Secretary
- Affiliations: WFTU
- Website: www.peo.org.cy

PEO, the Pancyprian Federation of Labour (Greek: Παγκύπρια Εργατική Ομοσπονδία, Turkish: Tüm Kıbrıs İşçi Federasyonu), is an umbrella organization for trade unions in Cyprus, which evolved from PSE (Greek: Παγκύπρια Συντεχνιακή Επιτροπή). It was instrumental in the 1948 strikes in the mines of the Cyprus Mines Corporation and has been closely related to AKEL.

== History ==
When AKEL was declared illegal by the British colonial government of Cyprus in 1955, PEO, and especially its leader Andreas Ziartides, was the only legal left-wing political entity, and it expressed the politics of underground AKEL.

PEO had a membership from all ethnic groups in Cyprus. In 1958, the Turkish Cypriot nationalist organisation TMT launched a terror campaign against Turkish Cypriot members of PEO, killing the journalist Fazıl Önder and attempting to kill the head of PEO's Turkish bureau, Ahmet Sadi. Following those events, most Turkish Cypriots left the union, and PEO's members since then have primarily been Greek Cypriots. The PEO is affiliated with the World Federation of Trade Unions.

List of general secretaries:

- Andreas Fantis (1941–1943)
- Andreas Ziartides (1943–1987)
- Pavlos Diglis (1987–1990)
- Abraham Antoniou (1990–1999)
- Pambis Kyritsis (1999–2022)
- Sotiroula Charalambous (2022–present)

== See also ==
- AKEL
- World Federation of Trade Unions
