= Ulus Baker =

Turkish sociologist and public intellectual (1960–2007)

- Born: 14 July 1960; Leningrad, Soviet Union
- Died: 12 July 2007 (aged 46); Fatih, Istanbul, Turkey

Education
- Education: Middle East Technical University (BA); Middle East Technical University (PhD)
- Thesis: 'Kanaatlerden İmajlara: Duygular Sosyolojisine Doğru' (2002)
- Doctoral advisor: Bahattin Akşit

Philosophical work
- Era: Contemporary philosophy
- Region: Western philosophy, Turkish philosophy
- School: Spinozism
- Notable works: Aşındırma Denemeleri; Siyasal Alanın Oluşumu Üzerine Bir Deneme; Yüzeybilim Fragmanlar; Dolaylı Eylem; Sanat ve Arzu

Ulus Sedat Baker (July 14, 1960 – July 12, 2007) was a Turkish Cypriot sociologist.

== Biography ==
Baker was born on July 14, 1960, in Leningrad, USSR. He was born to a cosmopolitan family; his mother was the Cypriot poet Pembe Marmara, and his father was the prominent psychiatrist of the island, Sedat Baker. Baker studied in the Soviet Union, Turkey, France, and Cyprus. He studied Sociology at the Middle East Technical University (METU) in Ankara, where he later taught as a lecturer. He was a very productive intellectual and a prolific scholar; he had already become an influential public intellectual in Turkish cultural life beyond the academia by mid-nineties. Although he had always taught within academic institutions, his relation with academia had certain tensions and breaks; he only completed his Ph.D. in 2002 with a thesis titled "From Opinions to Images: Towards a Sociology of Affects", he was uninterested in having a stable academic position, and after 2000 till his death, he had various teaching gigs in different universities in Ankara and Istanbul besides his main affiliation at Middle East Technical University. Shortly before his death, he also started teaching in Istanbul, where he died.

Baker was an influential figure in contemporary political theory in Turkey, both as a prolific author, and as a professor of sociology, media, and film theory. From late 80's till his death, he frequently wrote for major Turkish scholarly journals such as Birikim, Toplum ve Bilim, Virgül, and Defter. He was a polyglot, his fields of interest ranged from literary criticism to the cinema of Dziga Vertov. He significantly contributed to the rise of interest in the philosophy of Gilles Deleuze and Baruch Spinoza through a variety of translations and lecture series.

He helped found the autonomist political and artistic collective Körotonomedya in 1993 with Aras Ozgun, Hakan Topal, Ali Demirel and Ersan Ocak. Körotonomedya collective has been among the forerunners of experimental new media and video art in Turkey, and Baker's work within the collective became a major theoretical resource in these fields. The collective ceased their activities in 2011.

In 2007, Baker was teaching modern visual arts and visual thinking at the Audio Visual Systems Research and Production Centre (GİSAM) of METU and at Istanbul Bilgi University. He died on July 12, 2007, in Istanbul after being hospitalized for chronic liver deficiency.

Besides a multitude of articles in various publications, Baker's published works include; What is Opinion? (Pyromedia, 2001), Aşındırma Denemeleri (Birikim Yayınları, Istanbul, 2002), and Siyasal Alanın Oluşumu Üzerine Bir Deneme (Paragraf Yayınları, Ankara, 2005).
