= Urkiye Mine Balman =

Turkish Cypriot author and poet

Urkiye Mine Balman (January 29, 1927 - April 28, 2018) was a Turkish Cypriot author and poet who graduated from the Cyprus Turkish Teachers' Training College in 1946 and worked as a teacher in Cyprus. Balman wrote in a wide variety of genres. She is considered one of the pioneers of Cypriot women's poetry.

== Life ==
Balman was born in Lefke in 1927. She wrote her first poems in 1940. She graduated from the Cyprus Turkish Teachers' Training College in 1946 and worked in Cyprus as a primary school teacher.

Balman is considered one of the pioneers of Cypriot women's poetry. She wrote on a wide variety of genres, but her works are mostly romantic poems describing sometimes a lonesome village girl or country life and long-distance romances. Balman wrote in both rhyming and free verse, and was a member of the “Syllabic-Romantic” contemporary movement. Balman published her works in Yeşilada, Türk Dili, and Türk'e Doğru literary magazines in Turkey. Some of her poems have also been set to music by Turkish Cypriot musicians. Balman’s only published poetry collection, "Yurduma Giden Yollar" ["The Roads that Lead to My Home"], was published in 1952. She won the Leading Poet Award at the Ali Nesim Literature Awards in 2017.

Balman died on 28 April 2018 in Lefkosa, at the age of 91. She was buried next to her husband, a school inspector, who had predeceased her.

== Legacy ==
A bronze bust of Balman was added to the Cyprus Turkish Writers Bust Collection at the Walled City Museum in 2021.

In April 2022, four years after her death, the Near East University held a panel to commemorate her, during which a song composed by Kamran Aziz from Balman’s poem “Violin” was played on the piano.

== Works ==
- "Urkiye Mine Balman", Sevgisiir
- "Köy Düğünü" (Village Wedding) Gulum.net
- Yurduma Giden Yollar ("The Roads that Lead to My Home") 1952
- Kibris Turk Yazininin Ilk Kadin Sairlerinden URKIYE MINE BALMAN 2003
