= Vedia Barut =

Vedia Barut (14 February 1919 – 21 May 2003) was the first Turkish Cypriot businesswoman.

Barut was born in Nicosia on 14 February 1919, as the second of the three children of Mehmet Recep Bey, the chief imam of the Saint Sophia's Mosque, and Emine Hanım, a housewife. She started to be schooled at the age of 3 and started receiving violin lessons at the age of 9, being educated at the Ayasofya Primary School. She then graduated from the Victoria Girls' High School and wanted to pursue a career as a pharmacist, but as the British government had changed policy at the time and did not accept pharmaceutical training at Cypriot hospitals, her hopes were dashed. In response, her uncle persuaded her father so that a shop could be opened for her.

This shop was opened in 1937. This proved to be very controversial in a very patriarchal society, some reacted to this with vitriol and claimed that it would not be allowed for them to pray behind her father. Mithat Bey, a writer at the newspaper Söz, saw these reactions as absurd and became a staunch advocate for Barut, eventually leading to her gaining acceptance in society. Barut would operate her business until 2003, despite a fire in the 1980s destroying her shop and forcing her to open a new one with the help of her son. She first started with products that would appeal to women, but later switched to stationery and became the only official vendor of stationery during the World War II in Nicosia. She also became a newspaper distributor, uniquely selling not only Turkish-language newspaper but also Greek and English-language ones that came from the south of the Green Line. She thus became crucial in facilitating the contact between the two communities in Cyprus. After the 1980s fire, she quit the stationery business and continued with selling newspapers only.

She was also one of the first actresses of the nascent Turkish Cypriot theatre. Before the opening of her shop, she staged the adaptation of a popular Turkish play, Aşık Garip, with an amateur crew she established with her friends.
