= Ahmet Erdengiz =

Turkish Cypriot politician

Ahmet Erdengiz served as the ambassador of the Turkish Republic of Northern Cyprus (TRNC) to the United States from 1998 to 2002 and since 2009, has been serving a four-year ambassadorial duty in Brussels, Belgium. Since the TRNC is not a recognized entity, his title was the Representative of the TRNC. In 2009, he began to serve as the Undersecretary of Foreign Affairs. He was also appointed to the Committee on Missing Persons in Cyprus as the Assistant to the Turkish Member.
