= Hasan Tahsin (poet) =

Turkish Divan poet

- Born: 1800/1801; Nicosia
- Died: 18 August 1861
- Occupation: Divan poet

Hasan Tahsin (1800/1801 – 18 August 1861), also known as Kör Tahsin ("Blind Tahsin"), was a Turkish Cypriot divan poet and Islamic jurist. He rose to high-ranking judicial positions in the Ottoman Empire, becoming the kazasker of Rumelia. Not much of his written work survives.

== Life ==
Hasan Tahsin was born in Nicosia. His father was Hacı Mehmed Agha, the muhassıl of Cyprus and a surre emini, who owned a house in Damascus known as "Beytü'ş-şürefâ". His grandfather, Mehmed Agha, was also Cypriot. Hasan Tahsin started his educational life with the lessons he took from his father, learning about the Quran and tecvid. These lessons were later supplemented by lessons from local Cypriot scholars. He then moved to Constantinople, where he continued his Islamic studies, with the appointment of his father. While in Constantinople, he took lessons on sülus and nesih from the famous calligrapher Laz Ömer Efendi. He was educated in a madrasa, where learned about divan poetry and Islamic fine arts. When his father was appointed the muhassıl of Cyprus, he returned there, and upon his father's appointment as the surre emini in 1824, he went to Hijaz and made his Hajj, returning to Cyprus in 1826. Afterwards, he was known as Hacı Hasan Tahsin Bey.

He started his public service as a müderris (religious teacher in a madrasa) in Edirne in 1826/27. He then served as the qadi of Sofia, Üsküdar and Baghdad respectively. On 27 June 1834, he obtained the "license of Mecca" (Turkish: Mekke payesi), which allowed him to serve as a kazasker. During his time in Hijaz in obtaining this distinction, he had lessons from Sheikh Mehmed Can Efendi. After this, he was appointed first the qadi of Constantinople, afterwards being appointed to the sadaret of Anatolia and then in 1847 the sadaret of Rumelia.

On 15 January 1848 he was appointed as the nakîbü'l eşrâf. In October or November 1849, he was further designated as a member of the Meclis-i Vâlâ-yı Ahkâm-ı Adliyye ("Supreme Council of Judicial Ordinances"). With the decision of the Meclis-i Vâlâ to found a ministry for taking care of the properties of the orphans (Turkish: Emval-ı Eytam Nezareti), in November or December 1851 Hasan Tahsin was appointed the first minister of this institution with 24 employees. In October or November 1852, however, he was removed from his ministerial position and he served as the kazasker of Rumelia twice, in 1853 and in 1859. He also briefly served as the grand mufti.

== Literary style ==
According to literary historian Mehmet Fatih Köksal, commentary on Hasan Tahsin's poetry is close to none. His surviving works, according to Köksal, are not "enough in number to get to know a poet in depth", but those that to survive contain didactic couplets, which suggests that he was a follower of the style of Yusuf Nabi.

== Personal life ==
Hasan Tahsin has around 10 children. One of his eyes was blind, hence his nickname as "Blind Tahsin", and some jokes have been recorded about his blindness. Records exist about a keen interest by Hasan Tahsin on chemistry.
