= Mehmet Aziz =

Turkish Cypriot Public Health Professional (1893–1991)

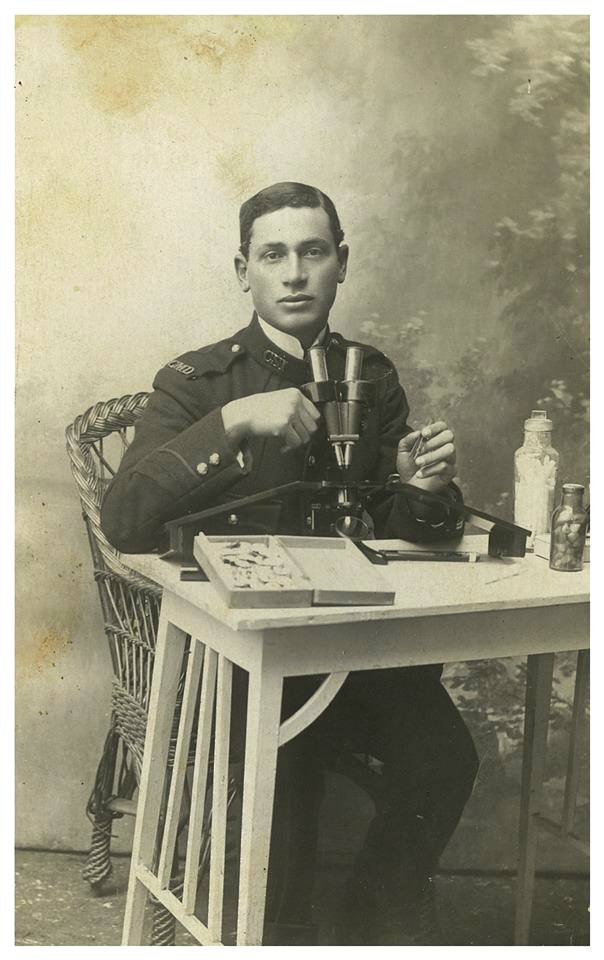
Mehmet Aziz in the 1920s

Mehmet Aziz, OBE, (September 24, 1893, Larnaca – June 17, 1991) was a Turkish Cypriot sanitary health inspector and ordinance professor. He was the Chief Health Inspector for the British colonial Government of Cyprus in the 1930s and 1940s, and is widely credited with eradicating malaria in Cyprus. He was made a CBE by the British crown for this work in 1950.

According to the London newspaper The Times, the three-year project to eradicate malaria in Cyprus was "largely carried out by the Cypriots themselves under the skilful organization of Mr Mehmed Aziz, the island's chief health inspector, who studied with Sir Ronald Ross."

== Career ==
Early British colonists in Cyprus had struggled to understand what caused malaria and it was not until the pioneering Scottish malariologist Ronald Ross established the connection between the disease and the anopheles mosquito that it became possible to address the problem of how the disease could be brought under control.

Ross visited Cyprus in 1913 and took the young Aziz under his wing, but attempts to eliminate malaria in Cyprus floundered due to a shortage of funds. It was not until 1946, after studying similar attempts to control the disease in Egypt, that Aziz (by now chief health inspector for the colony) secured a grant from the Colonial Development Fund to eradicate the anopheles mosquito from Cyprus.

Aziz and his team divided the entire island up into 556 blocks, according to a grid plan. Each block could be covered by one man over a period of 12 days. The campaign began on the Karpas Peninsula and moved westward and while it lasted all traffic travelling from 'unclean' to 'clean' areas of the island had to be sprayed with insecticide. Working methodically, inch by inch, the men sprayed every area of standing water they could find, with such meticulousness it was said that even the hoof prints left by animals were treated.

The total elimantion of malaria from the island took just over three years, and by February 1950, Cyprus had become the world's first malaria-free country.

According to the American Medical Association, Aziz was "widely honored for his achievement in Cyprus, called 'the great liberator' and likened to St. Patrick for ridding his native land of a pest far more insidious than snakes." Aziz was quoted by the same journal as saying, "I was brought up in a village where sanitary conditions were bad. Many young people died who probably would have lived had conditions been better. If in the course of my service I have done something for the improvement and welfare of my country, that is the greatest pleasure I feel."

== Cultural legacy and commemoration ==
In recognition of Mehmet Aziz’s pivotal role in the successful malaria eradication programme in Cyprus, contemporary artistic works have engaged with his legacy and the broader history of public health on the island. On 3 May 2025, a concert was held at Shakespeare House in Cyprus, led by musician Burcu Karagöz, which sought to reinterpret the historical narrative of malaria elimination through music. The event blended musical performance with public health history, aiming to move beyond a purely medical framing by highlighting the social, political, and personal dimensions of the malaria-cessation story. The concert concluded with the world premiere of a new composition titled Sinekci Aziz Efendi ve Arkadaşları — a piece composed and performed by Karagöz that commemorates the labour of public health in Cyprus and pays homage to Aziz and his contemporaries. The performance and composition have since been presented as part of broader efforts to celebrate and reflect on the island’s malaria-free transformation through artistic expression.

== Extinction of the Cypriot freshwater blenny ==
Although glorified for his extermination of Malaria in Cyprus, the disease was not all Aziz was attributed to have exterminated from the island. The Cypriot freshwater blenny was a fish reported from just 2-3 torrents in the Limassol district by the then Commissioner of Limassol, Roland L. N. Michell in 1909. Now presumed extinct on the island and potentially an endemic species, the extermination of the species was attributed to Aziz's DDT campaign.

== Personal life ==
He was married to Hifsiye. Their daughters include Türkan Aziz, who became the first chief nurse on the island, and Kamran Aziz, who was the first female Turkish Cypriot composer and pharmacist.

Aziz died in 1991, aged 98, in north Nicosia.
