= Ayhan Hikmet =

Cypriot journalist

- Born: 1929; Nicosia, Cyprus
- Died: April 23, 1962 (aged 32–33); Nicosia, Cyprus
- Occupations: Journalist, Editor, Barrister

Ayhan Hikmet was a Turkish Cypriot who was allegedly assassinated by the Turkish paramilitary group TMT. He was a trained barrister, and editor of the Turkish Cypriot weekly newspaper Cumhuriyet.

On 23 April 1962, masked men broke into his home and shot him in the presence of his wife. His two children were asleep in another room.

On the same day, his friend and colleague Ahmet Muzaffer Gürkan, who founded Cumhuriyet and served as its first editor, was also murdered. He was found dead in his car on the outskirts of Nicosia the following morning.

Both men had been instrumental in founding the Cyprus Turkish People's Party in October 1961, which in its first manifesto had been critical of the Turkish Cypriot leaders, eschewed partition, and called on Turkish Cypriots to support a united Cyprus. Following their murders Cumhuriyet ceased to be published.

President Makarios described the murders as an “odious crime” against individuals who had “ranged themselves on the side of cooperation and the harmonious coexistence of Greeks and Turks and persistently condemned the policy of the extremist elements in their community." He added: “No matter what political differences there may be among the members of the Turkish community, on no account are murder and violence permissible against their opponents, especially when those opponents practise the high calling of journalism.”

Fazıl Küçük, then Vice-President of Cyprus, said: “I think the persons who committed these murders will not be able to serve any other purpose than undermine order and security within our community and the whole island.”
