= Kamran Aziz =

Cypriot musician and pharmacist

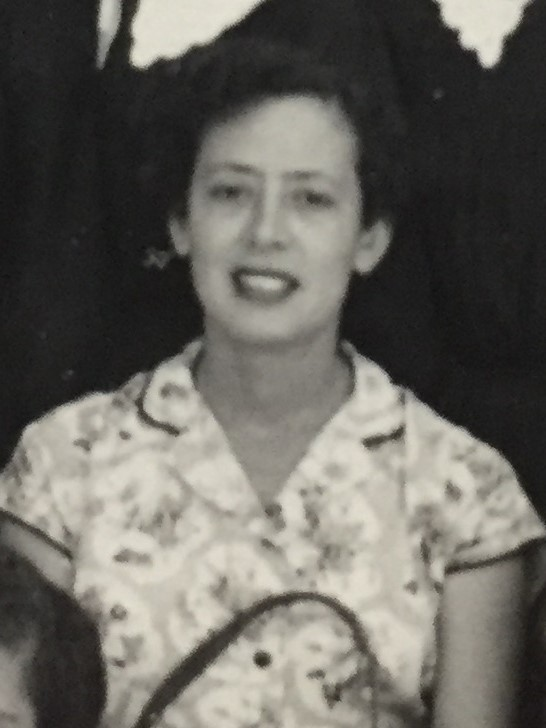
- Kamran Aziz in 1954

Background information
- Born: 1922; Nicosia, British Cyprus
- Died: 7 March 2017 (aged 95) North Nicosia, Northern Cyprus
- Occupation: Composer

Kamran Aziz (1922 – 7 March 2017) was a Cypriot musician and pharmacist. She was the first female composer and the first female pharmacist in Turkish Cypriot society. She made significant contributions to Turkish Cypriot folk music to the extent that she started the genre in its modern sense. She was also one of the first female musicians to play in public and pioneered the playing and teaching of western music, along with her colleague, Jale Derviş.

== Early life ==
Aziz was born in 1922. She was the daughter of Mehmet Aziz, a doctor credited with eradicating malaria in Cyprus; her elder sister, Türkan Aziz, later became the first chief nurse on the island. She started her musical education at the age of 8 by learning how to play the piano. She graduated from American Academy Nicosia.

She received education in pharmacology from the Cypriot government, graduating in 1944 to become the first Turkish Cypriot female pharmacist along with Ayşe Dana.

== Musical career ==
Aziz started her musical broadcasts on the British Military Radio in 1945. She started translating classical pieces into Turkish in that year, years before similar translations would start in Turkey. She founded a musical ensemble called Kâmran Aziz ve Arkadaşları ("Kâmran Aziz and her Friends") in 1950. This ensemble performed on radio and afterwards on TV at the Cyprus Broadcasting Corporation until 1963. They played popular songs as well as translations of opera arias and Lieder of composers such as Schubert into Turkish. These translations were mostly carried out by Aziz herself and her colleague Jale Derviş. This reshaped the musical taste of Turkish Cypriot society and popularised the ensemble. Aziz and Derviş composed tangos, waltzes and marches as well. Despite the majority of her compositions being non-folkloric, some of the songs composed by Aziz were inspired by Cypriot folk music. These songs have proven to be highly popular and are now presented as part of the Turkish Cypriot folk music canon.

Her role in the Turkish Cypriot musical tradition led to the Cultural Committee of the Assembly of the Republic awarding her a Special Prize.

== Career as a pharmacist ==
Aziz opened her pharmacy, the Aziz Pharmacy, in 1947. Throughout her career, she managed music and her pharmacy together. In 1959, she founded the Turkish Cypriot Union of Pharmacists with eleven other pharmacists. She played an influential role in a failed attempt to found the first pharmaceutical warehouse in Northern Cyprus, which would greatly ease access to medication and prevent shortages. She later played a similar role in the foundation of the Güç Warehouse, the greatest one in Northern Cyprus at the time, in 1988. This warehouse was co-owned by a state enterprise and individual pharmacists and was named by Aziz herself, who remained on its board of directors until 1997. Aziz closed her pharmacy in 1997. Her pharmacy inspired a local museum of pharmacology, which was opened in 2011.

== Death ==
Aziz was hospitalised with pulmonary complications in 2017 and remained in Dr. Burhan Nalbantoğlu State Hospital in North Nicosia for a month. She died on 7 March 2017 at the age of 95, one day after having been discharged from the hospital. Her funeral prayer was held in Ismail Safa Mosque and she was buried in Nicosia. Turkish Cypriot President Mustafa Akıncı and Prime Minister Hüseyin Özgürgün published messages of condolence in reaction to her death.
