= List of Türk Maarif College alumni =

This list of alumni of Türk Maarif College includes graduates, non-graduate former students, and current students of Türk Maarif College, Nicosia, Northern Cyprus.

== Politicians ==
=== Government ===
==== Prime Ministers ====
- Serdar Denktaş (acting, 2005)
- Tufan Erhürman (2018-2019)

==== Deputy Prime Ministers ====
- Hasan Taçoy (acting, 2015)
- Serdar Denktaş (1996-1998, 2004-2006, 2013-2015, 2016-2018)

==== Cabinet Ministers ====
- Hasan Taçoy, Economy and Energy (2019-present), Public Works and Transport (2009-2010, 2014-2015), Economy, Tourism, Culture and Sport (acting, 2015)
- Tolga Atakan, Public Works and Transport (2018-present)
- Asım Vehbi, Environment and Natural Resources (2006-2008)
- Birikim Özgür, Finance (2015-2016), Economy, Industry and Commerce (acting, 2016)
- Derviş Kemal Deniz, Economy and Tourism (2004-2006)
- Filiz Besim, Health (2018-2019)
- Gülsün Yücel, Interior (2013)
- Hakan Dinçyürek, Environment and Natural Resources (2014-2015)
- Kutlay Erk, Foreign Affairs (2013)
- Kutlu Evren, Interior (2016-2018)
- Mehmet Altınay, Finance (1976), Labour and Social Security (1985-1986), National Education and Culture (1998-2001)
- Mehmet Harmancı, Tourism, Environment and Culture (2013)
- Özdemir Berova, National Education and Culture (2016-2017)
- Özdil Nami, Foreign Affairs (2013-2015), Economy and Energy (2018-2019)
- Raşit Pertev, Agriculture and Forestry (2004-2005)
- Sami Dayıoğlu, Agriculture and Natural Resources (2013)
- Serdar Denktaş, Interior, Rural Affairs and Environment (1990-1992), Sport, Youth and Environment (1994-1995), State (1996-1998), Labour and Settlement (acting, 1998), Tourism and Environment (2001-2004), Foreign Affairs (2004-2006), Economy, Tourism, Culture and Sport (2013-2015), National Education (acting, 2014), Finance (2016-2019), National Education and Culture (acting, 2017-2018)
- Tahsin Ertuğruloğlu, Foreign Affairs and Defence (1998-2004), Transport (2015-2016), Foreign Affairs (2016-2018)

=== Parliament ===
==== Deputy Speakers ====
- Hüseyin Avkıran Alanlı (2015-2018)

==== Leaders of Main Opposition ====
- Serdar Denktaş (1998-2000, 2015-2016)
- Tahsin Ertuğruloğlu (2006-2008)
- Tufan Erhürman (2016-2018, 2019-present)

==== Members of Parliament ====
- Biray Hamzaoğluları (2013-present)
- Doğuş Derya (2013-present)
- Erek Çağatay (2018-present)
- Fazilet Özdenefe (2013-present)
- Gülşah Sanver Manavoğlu (2018-present)
- Hakan Dinçyürek (2013-present)
- Hasan Taçoy (1998-present)
- Jale Refik Rogers (2018-present)
- Koral Çağman (2018-present)
- Kutlu Evren (2013-present)
- Özdemir Berova (2013-present)
- Özdil Nami (2003-present)
- Serdar Denktaş (1990-1993, 1993-present)
- Sıla Usar İncirli (2018-present)
- Tolga Atakan (2018-present)
- Tufan Erhürman (2013-present)
- Birikim Özgür (2013-2018)
- Hüseyin Avkıran Alanlı (2003-2018)
- Mehmet Altınay (1976-1990)
- Raif Denktaş (1976-1981, 1983-1985)
- Savaş Atakan (1998-2003)
- Tahsin Ertuğruloğlu (1998-2018)

=== Members of Parliamentary Assembly of the Council of Europe ===
- Özdil Nami (2005-2008)
- Tahsin Ertuğruloğlu (2009-2010)

=== Mayors ===
==== Mayors of Nicosia ====
- Mehmet Harmancı (2014-present)
- Kutlay Erk (2002-2006)

==== Mayors of Lefke ====
- Aziz Kaya (2014-present)

== Bureaucrats and diplomats ==
=== Ambassadors ===
- Mustafa Lakadamyalı, Ambassador of Northern Cyprus to Turkey (2010-2014)

=== Negotiations Team ===
==== Chief Negotiators ====
- Özdil Nami
- Raşit Pertev

==== Members of Negotiations Team ====
- Barış Burcu
- Erhan Erçin
- Sertaç Güven
- Sülen Karabacak Mehrübeoğlu
- Tufan Erhürman, former

=== Advisors to the President ===
- Erhan Erçin, Special Advisor on Diplomacy and European Union Affairs
- Güneş Onar, Advisory and Political Affairs Director
- Ömer Gökçekuş, Special Advisor on Economy
- Sülen Karabacak Mehrübeoğlu, Special Advisor for Legal Affairs
- Raif Denktaş, former Advisor on Politics

=== Other ===
- Serdar Çam, President of Turkish Cooperation and Coordination Agency, Turkey

== Artists ==
=== Musicians ===
- Ali Hoca
- Arda Gündüz
- Buray Hoşsöz
- Cahit Kutrafalı
- Erdinç Gündüz
- Genco Ecer
- Günay Bozkurt
- Oskay Hoca
- Raif Denktaş

=== Poets, authors and writers ===
- Neşe Yaşın
- Özdemir Tokel
- Raşit Pertev
- Sevgül Uludağ
- Süleyman Ergüçlü

=== Fashion designers ===
- Abdullah Öztoprak
- Hussein Chalayan

=== Screenwriters ===
- Tamer Garip

== Academia ==
- Birikim Özgür, assistant professor of educational sciences at European University of Lefke
- Emine Beton, former headmistress of Türk Maarif College
- Fehmi Tokay, headmaster of Türk Maarif College
- Halil Güven, professor, dean of San Diego State University Georgia Campus
- Hüseyin Yaratan, associate professor of education at Cyprus International University, head of executive board of Atatürk Teacher Training Academy
- Mehmet Ali Yükselen, rector of European University of Lefke
- Mustafa Djamgoz, professor of cancer biology at Imperial College London
- Raif Denktaş, former lecturer of politics at Eastern Mediterranean University
- Süleyman Başak, professor of finance at London Business School, University of London
- Tufan Erhürman, former associate professor of public law at Eastern Mediterranean University
- Uğur Dağlı, professor of architecture at Eastern Mediterranean University

== Businesspeople ==
- Asım Vehbi, CEO of Girne American University
- Lisani Atasayan, general manager of Coca-Cola Içecek
- Ozan Dağlı, founder of Dağlı Trading Ltd.
- Suat Günsel, founder of Near East University

== Sportspeople ==
- Adem Kaan Kaner, president of Yenicami Ağdelen Kulübü
- Ali Başman, former president of Küçük Kaymaklı Türk Spor Kulübü
- Asım Vehbi, former president of Çetinkaya Türk Spor Kulübü
- Halit Kıryağdı, former basketball player, basketball coach
- Hüseyin Amcaoğlu, former footballer and captain of Northern Cyprus national football team
- Hüseyin Can Ağdelen, chess player, Northern Cyprus champion, Turkey under-age champion, first International Master of Northern Cyprus
- Mehmet Özbilgehan, former international football referee
- Nevzat Nasıroğlu, basketballer
- Orçun Kamalı, vice-president of Cyprus Turkish Football Association
- Yamaç Samani, chess player, Northern Cyprus champion
- Zehra Yılmaz, international volleyball referee
