= 10th Parliament of the Turkish Republic of Northern Cyprus =

This is a list of members of parliament (MPs) elected to the Assembly of the Republic for the 10th Parliament of the Turkish Republic of Northern Cyprus at the 2022 parliamentary election.

The list below indicates the MPs in the parties in which they were elected; any change of political party is indicated separately.

Party	Members	Change	Proportion
National Unity Party	24	▲3	48%
Republican Turkish Party	18	▲6	36%
Democratic Party	3	0	6%
People's Party	3	▼6	6%
Rebirth Party	2	0	4%
Total	50		100%

== Lefkoşa ==
Member of Parliament	Party
Faiz Sucuoğlu	National Unity Party
Olgun Amcaoğlu	National Unity Party
Ahmet Savaşan	National Unity Party
Hasan Taçoy	National Unity Party
Alişan Şan	National Unity Party
Sadık Gardiyanoğlu	National Unity Party
Zorlu Töre	National Unity Party
Tufan Erhürman	Republican Turkish Party
Sıla Usar İncirli	Republican Turkish Party
Doğuş Derya	Republican Turkish Party
Ürün Solyalı	Republican Turkish Party
Devrim Barçın	Republican Turkish Party
Filiz Besim	Republican Turkish Party
Kudret Özersay	People's Party
Hasan Tosunoğlu	Democratic Party
Talip Atalay	Rebirth Party

== Gazimağusa ==
Member of Parliament	Party
Dursun Oğuz	National Unity Party
Sunat Atun	National Unity Party
Oğuzhan Hasipoğlu	National Unity Party
Hakan Dinçyürek	National Unity Party
Resmiye Eroğlu Canaltay	National Unity Party
Hüseyin Çavuş	National Unity Party
Asım Akansoy	Republican Turkish Party
Teberrüken Uluçay	Republican Turkish Party
Erkut Şahali	Republican Turkish Party
Şifa Çolakoğlu	Republican Turkish Party
Fikri Ataoğlu	Democratic Party
Ayşegül Baybars	People's Party
Erhan Arıklı	Rebirth Party

== Girne ==
Member of Parliament	Party
Kutlu Evren	National Unity Party
İzlem Gürçağ Altuğra	National Unity Party
Ünal Üstel	National Unity Party
Özdemir Berova	National Unity Party
Hasan Küçük	National Unity Party
Ongun Talat	Republican Turkish Party
Fikri Toros	Republican Turkish Party
Fazilet Özdenefe	Republican Turkish Party
Ceyhun Birinci	Republican Turkish Party
Jale Refik Rogers	People's Party
Serhat Akpınar	Democratic Party

== İskele ==
Member of Parliament	Party
Nazım Çavuşoğlu	National Unity Party
Yasemi Öztürk	National Unity Party
Emrah Yeşilırmak	National Unity Party
Biray Hamzaoğluları	Republican Turkish Party
Fide Kürşat	Republican Turkish Party

== Güzelyurt ==
Member of Parliament	Party
Ali Pilli	National Unity Party
Ziya Öztürkler	National Unity Party
Armağan Candan	Republican Turkish Party

== Lefke ==
Member of Parliament	Party
Fırtına Karanfil	National Unity Party
Salahi Şahiner	Republican Turkish Party
