= 9th Parliament of the Turkish Republic of Northern Cyprus =

This is a list of members of parliament (MPs) elected to the Assembly of the Republic for the 9th Parliament of the Turkish Republic of Northern Cyprus at the 2018 parliamentary election.

The list below indicates the MPs in the parties in which they were elected; any change of political party is indicated separately.

Party	Members	Change	Proportion
National Unity Party	21	▲7	42%
Republican Turkish Party	12	▼9	24%
People's Party	9	new	18%
Democratic Party	3	▼9	6%
Communal Democracy Party	3	0	6%
Rebirth Party	2	new	4%
Total	50		100%

== Lefkoşa ==
Member of Parliament	Party
Faiz Sucuoğlu	National Unity Party
vacant	National Unity Party
Hüseyin Özgürgün	National Unity Party
Hasan Taçoy	National Unity Party
Olgun Amcaoğlu	National Unity Party
Zorlu Töre	National Unity Party
Tufan Erhürman	Republican Turkish Party
Özdil Nami	Republican Turkish Party
Sıla Usar İncirli	Republican Turkish Party
Doğuş Derya	Republican Turkish Party
Kudret Özersay	People's Party
Tolga Atakan	People's Party
Gülşah Sanver Manavoğlu	People's Party
Cemal Özyiğit	Communal Democracy Party
Serdar Denktaş	Democratic Party
Bertan Zaroğlu	Rebirth Party

== Gazimağusa ==
Member of Parliament	Party
Sunat Atun	National Unity Party
Dursun Oğuz	National Unity Party
Oğuzhan Hasipoğlu	National Unity Party
Ersan Saner	National Unity Party
Resmiye Canaltay	National Unity Party
Erkut Şahali	Republican Turkish Party
Teberrüken Uluçay	Republican Turkish Party
Asım Akansoy	Republican Turkish Party
Hasan Topal	People's Party
Ayşegül Baybars	People's Party
Fikri Ataoğlu	Democratic Party
Hüseyin Angolemli	Communal Democracy Party
Erhan Arıklı	Rebirth Party

== Girne ==
Member of Parliament	Party
Kutlu Evren	National Unity Party
Ünal Üstel	National Unity Party
İzlem Gürçağ	National Unity Party
Özdemir Berova	National Unity Party
Fazilet Özdenefe	Republican Turkish Party
Fikri Toros	Republican Turkish Party
Erek Çağatay	People's Party
Jale Refik Rogers	People's Party
Zeki Çeler	Communal Democracy Party
Koral Çağman	Democratic Party

== İskele ==
Member of Parliament	Party
Nazım Çavuşoğlu	National Unity Party
Önder Sennaroğlu	National Unity Party
Yasemi Öztürk	National Unity Party
Biray Hamzaoğluları	Republican Turkish Party
Mesut Genç	People's Party

== Güzelyurt ==
Member of Parliament	Party
Ali Pilli	National Unity Party
Menteş Gündüz	National Unity Party
Armağan Candan	Republican Turkish Party
Hasan Büyükoğlu	People's Party

== Lefke ==
Member of Parliament	Party
Aytaç Çaluda	National Unity Party
Salahi Şahiner	Republican Turkish Party
