= 2025 Northern Cypriot presidential election =

- 19 October 2025
- Turnout: 64.87%
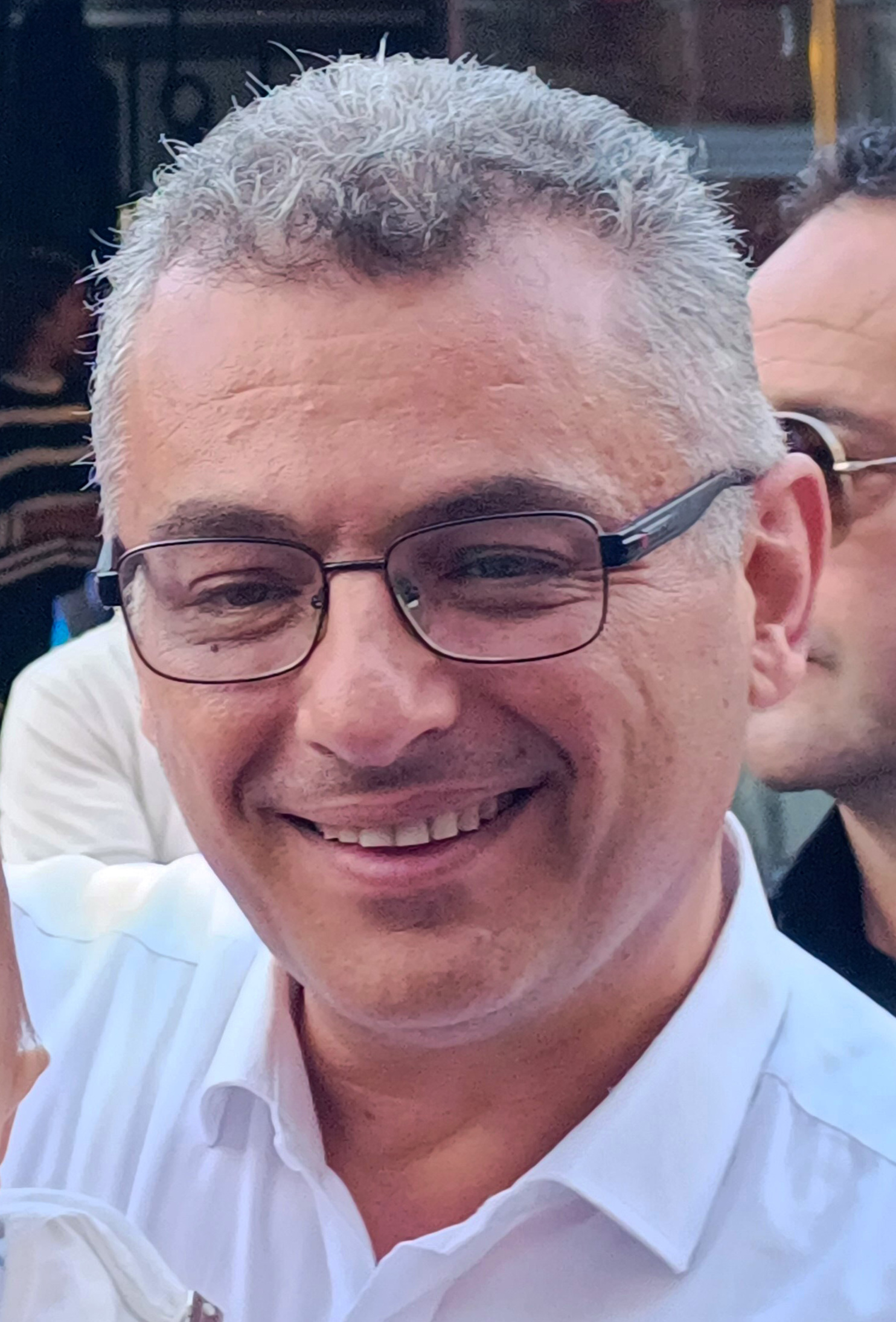

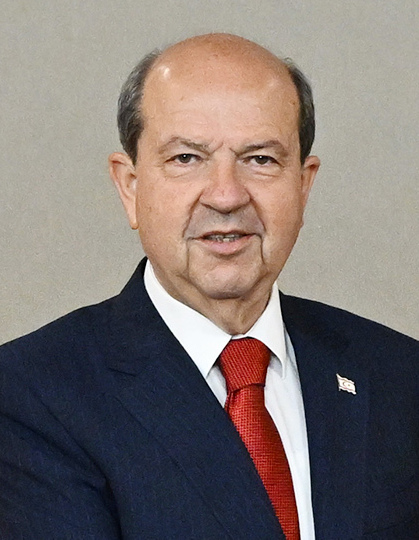
Candidate	Tufan Erhürman	Ersin Tatar
Party	CTP	Independent
Popular vote	87,137	49,714
Percentage	62.76%	35.81%
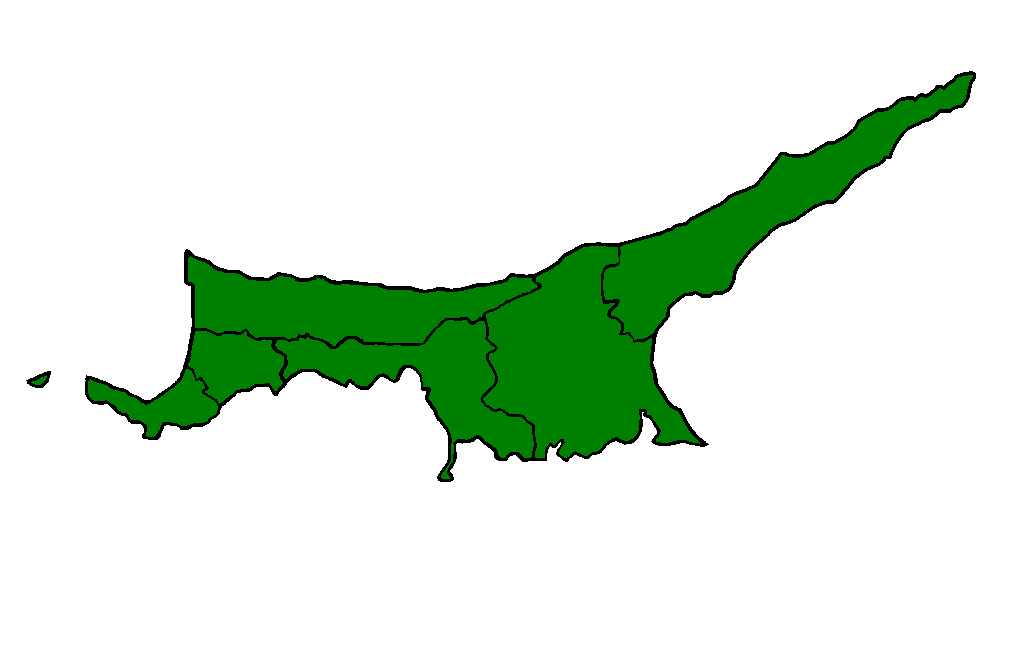
- Results by district (green for Tufan Erhürman)
President before election
Ersin Tatar
Independent
Elected President
Tufan Erhürman
CTP

Presidential elections were held in Northern Cyprus on 19 October 2025. Incumbent president Ersin Tatar was defeated by Tufan Erhürman of the Republican Turkish Party (CTP), who received 63% of the vote.

== Background ==
=== Economic crisis ===
In 2022, Northern Cyprus was affected by the devaluation of the Turkish lira as a result of the Turkish economic crisis. The increase in exchange rates increased import costs and fuelled inflation. In particular, food inflation reached 99%, reaching the highest level since the 1990s. The Russian invasion of Ukraine also negatively affected the TRNC by increasing energy and commodity prices.

The high level of inflation has seriously reduced the purchasing power of the people, making it difficult to access basic necessities. Economic pressures have also affected family structure; an increase in divorce rates has been observed.

The government sought economic support through financial protocols signed with Turkey. However, opinions differ on the effectiveness of these protocols.

=== 2025 protests ===
In 2025, there was a wide public outcry after middle school student İkra Şimşek was not allowed into school because she was wearing a headscarf. Following this incident, the government published a regulation in the Official Gazette on 8 April 2025, on the grounds that it would eliminate a legal gap regarding the headscarf, and put it into effect. Although this decision was considered by some as a guarantee of individual freedoms, concerns that the principle of secularism was being eroded triggered social opposition.

The beginning of the protests was announced at a press conference held on 4 April, led by the Cyprus Turkish Teachers' Union (KTÖS) and the Cyprus Turkish Secondary Education Teachers' Union (KTOEÖS). At this meeting, it was emphasized that they would not remain silent against political interventions targeting secular education and social structure, and it was announced that a large-scale action would be held with the participation of nearly 40 organizations.

The participation of the children of the founding leaders of Northern Cyprus, Fazıl Küçük and Rauf Denktaş, in the protests revealed that the defense of secularism was not limited to left-wing groups, but also found a response in nationalist circles that are sensitive about historical identity and independence. The slogan "Cyprus will stay secular" came to the fore during the protests.

== Electoral system ==
Presidential elections are held directly with universal suffrage and by secret ballot. Every citizen over the age of 18 has the right to vote. Presidential elections are held every 5 years. The minimum age for the presidency is set at 35. In the TRNC, a candidate participating in the election must receive an absolute majority of the valid votes cast to be elected president. If none of the candidates receive an absolute majority, the election is renewed after 7 days between the two candidates who receive the most votes and the candidate who receives the most votes is elected as the new president.

== Candidates ==
=== National Unity Party ===
On 2 June 2025 the Democrat Party and the Rebirth Party held an event called "Common Sense Consensus" to support President Ersin Tatar's second-term candidacy. These three parties stated that they would partner for the next presidential election.

The statement emphasized the importance of Turkish Cypriots defending their sovereignty in the face of the Greek Cypriot side's uncompromising stance and stated that Tatar's two-state solution policy reflects the will of the people. In his speech, President Tatar expressed his determination to promote the TRNC internationally and the need to strengthen the understanding of national unity.

Tatar also had the support of the Turkish government.

=== Republican Turkish Party ===
On 6 April 2025 the Republican Turkish Party Assembly unanimously voted for Chairman Tufan Erhürman as its presidential candidate. This decision was later approved by the party congress. Erhürman received support not only within the party but also from independent members of parliament. He announced his candidacy on social media, emphasizing a presidential approach that would represent the integrity of the people.

Mehmet Harmancı, the strongest potential candidate for the Communal Democracy Party, called for his party to not field a candidate in the elections and support CTP candidate Tufan Erhürman.

Münür Rahvancıoğlu said that Independence Path might not field a candidate if only Erhürman and Tatar compete but in the end, the party refused to endorse him. İzzet İzcan of the United Cyprus Party avoided endorsing Erhürman directly but stated that they "support candidates who advocate for peace against those who uphold the status quo" and acknowledged the common views with Erhürman.

=== Cyprus Socialist Party ===
The party's Central Committee released a written statement announcing its decision to run its own candidate in the elections. During the nomination process, Osman Zorba, a member of the party's Central Committee, was selected as the presidential candidate, and the candidacy was announced to the public.

=== Independent candidates ===
Mehmet Hasgüler and Arif Salih Kırdağ announced that they would participate in the elections as independent candidates. Although it was claimed that Serdar Denktaş would also be a candidate due to a statement he made on July 18, 2024, he did not announce his candidacy.

On October 18, the Supreme Election Council (YSK) announced that Hüseyin Gürlek applied to the Supreme Election Council and announced his withdrawal from the presidential candidacy. In accordance with the Election and Referendum Law, the name of the withdrawn candidate continued to appear on the ballot. Hüseyin Gürlek announced he withdrew in favor of Ersin Tatar.

=== Confirmed ===
The final candidate list announced by the YSK is as follows:

- İbrahim Yazıcı – Independent
- Osman Zorba – Cyprus Socialist Party
- Ersin Tatar – Independent
- Arif Salih Kırdağ – Independent
- Mehmet Hasgüler – Independent
- Tufan Erhürman – Republican Turkish Party
- Ahmet Boran – Independent
- Hüseyin Gürlek – Independent

== Campaign ==
Tatar supported the continued division of Cyprus into two separate states while Erhurman supported a resumption of negotiations with Greek Cypriots towards a binational Cypriot federation and criticized Tatar's hardline stance for isolating the Turkish Cypriot community internationally.

== Opinion polls ==
Fieldwork date	Polling firm	Sample size	Erhürman CTP	Siber CTP	Tatar Ind.	Özersay HP	Manavoğlu HP	Harmancı TDP	Denktaş DP	Arıklı YDP	Others	Lead
Election results		141,615	62.76	–	35.81	–	–	–	–	–	1.43	26.95
4 Oct	Public Global	1,516	47.90	–	51.20	–	–	–	–	–	0.90	3.30
2 Oct	CMIRS	500	50.40	–	40.60	–	–	–	–	–	9.00	9.80
Sep–Oct	GENAR	~200	40.01	–	41.80	–	–	–	–	–	18.10	1.79
August	CMIRS	500	51.63	–	46.64	–	–	–	–	–	1.74	4.99
April	CMIRS	500	33.80	–	35.10	6.60	–	5.80	4.50	6.20	8.00	1.30
4 April			Anti-government protests broke out across TRNC.									
8–21 Mar	GENAR	200	36.00	–	37.90	6.80	–	7.00	4.60	7.10	0.60	1.90
March	CMIRS	500	33.83	2.34	35.11	6.60	1.91	5.74	4.47	6.17	3.93	1.28
2025
December	CMIRS	500	34.56	2.59	29.81	7.99	4.54	8.21	2.16	5.18	4.96	4.75
September	CMIRS	500	38.08	2.34	37.02	3.19	2.77	9.36	1.91	3.19	2.14	1.06
June	CMIRS	500	36.21	2.27	29.83	7.61	3.08	7.82	5.14	4.73	3.31	6.38
2024

== Results ==
The turnout was 64.87% of registered voters. Tufan Erhürman of the Republican Turkish Party was elected president with 62.76% of the vote, while incumbent Ersin Tatar (independent) received 35.81%.

Candidate	Party	Votes	%
Tufan Erhürman	Republican Turkish Party	87,137	62.76
Ersin Tatar	Independent	49,714	35.81
Arif Salih Kırdağ	Independent	458	0.33
Osman Zorba	Cyprus Socialist Party	443	0.32
İbrahim Yazıcı	Independent	331	0.24
Mehmet Hasgüler	Independent	300	0.22
Hüseyin Gürlek	Independent	258	0.19
Ahmet Boran	Independent	198	0.14
Total		138,839	100.00
Valid votes		138,839	98.12
Invalid/blank votes		2,665	1.88
Total votes		141,504	100.00
Registered voters/turnout		218,313	64.82
Source: YSK

== Aftermath ==
At a victory rally in North Nicosia, Tufan Erhürman said the election was a victory for all Turkish Cypriots, adding that any steps to revive peace efforts with the Greek community would continue to be subject to consultation with Turkey. Greek Cypriot president Nikos Christodoulides expressed congratulations, adding that he looks forward to meeting Erhürman as soon as possible and reiterated his readiness to resume peace talks.

Turkish president Recep Tayyip Erdoğan congratulated Erhürman and said that Turkey would "continue to defend the rights and sovereign interests" of Northern Cyprus. He also stated that the election “demonstrates the democratic maturity possessed by the Turkish Republic of Northern Cyprus”. Hakan Fidan, Turkish Minister of Foreign Affairs stated that “The only realistic solution to the Cyprus problem lies in the acceptance of the existence of two separate states on the island,". Turkish far-right leader Devlet Bahçeli rejected the election results and called on the Northern Cypriot parliament to pursue unification with Turkey. Conversely, Turkish opposition leader, Özgür Özel, of the Republican People’s Party welcomed the results and criticized the autocratic drift into which Turkish domestic elections are turning, saying, “I hope those in Ankara... who openly flout the law, resorting to all kinds of smear campaigns to ensure their supported candidate’s victory, have correctly understood the message of the Turkish Cypriot people.”
