= Gülşah Sanver Manavoğlu =

Turkish Cypriot businsesswoman, politician

- Born: October 12, 1971 (age 54); Nicosia, Cyprus
- Education: Bilkent University
- Occupations: Businesswoman, politician
- Political party: People's Party Güner Manavoğlu (Son) Mehmet Manavoglu (Wife)

Gülşah Sanver Manavoğlu (born October 12, 1971), is a Turkish Cypriot businesswoman and politician.

Manavoğlu was born in Nicosia on October 12, 1971. In 1989, she graduated from the Türk Maarif Koleji, and in 1993, she earned her degree in economics from Bilkent University. She continues to serve as a director in the family business.

On January 17, 2021, she was elected General Secretary of the People's Party (Halkın Partisi). She entered parliament in the early general elections of January 7, 2018, as a Member of Parliament for Nicosia representing the People's Party. In November 2022, she resigned from the party along with 64 other members, including Jale Refik Rogers and Ayşegül Baybars.
