= Kızılay =

Kızılay is the short name for Kızılay Derneği, the Turkish Red Crescent.

== Places ==
Cyprus

- Kızılay, Cyprus the Turkish name for the town of Trachonas

Turkey

- Kızılay, Ankara, a neighborhood of Ankara, and one of the primary nerve centers of the city
  - Kızılay Meydanı, a square in the neighborhood
