= List of mayors of Nicosia Turkish Municipality =

This is a list of mayors of North Nicosia (Nicosia Turkish Municipality), Northern Cyprus.

== Mayors (1958-2013) ==
- Tahsin Gözmen: 1958-1962
- Cevdet Mirata: 1962-1962
- Fuat Celalettin: 1962-1968
- Ziver Kemal: 1969-1976
- Mustafa Akıncı: 1976-1990
- Burhan Yetkili: 1990-1994
- Şemi Bora: 1994-2002
- Kutlay Erk: 2002-2006
- Cemal Metin Bulutoğluları: 2006–2013
- Kadri Fellahoğlu: 2013-2014
- Mehmet Harmancı: 2014-present
