= Ersan Saner =

14th prime minister of Northern Cyprus

Prime Minister of Northern Cyprus
- In office 9 December 2020 – 5 November 2021
- President: Ersin Tatar
- Preceded by: Ersin Tatar
- Succeeded by: Faiz Sucuoğlu

Leader of the National Unity Party
- In office 20 December 2020 – 31 October 2021
- Preceded by: Ersin Tatar
- Succeeded by: Faiz Sucuoğlu

Minister of Labor and Social Security
- In office 16 April 2016 – 2 February 2018
- President: Mustafa Akıncı
- Prime Minister: Hüseyin Özgürgün
- Preceded by: Asım Akansoy
- Succeeded by: Zeki Çeler

Minister of Transport and Public Works
- In office 17 May 2010 – 13 June 2013
- President: Derviş Eroğlu
- Prime Minister: Irsen Küçük
- Succeeded by: İsmail Başarır

Minister of Tourism, Environment and Culture
- In office 5 May 2009 – 17 May 2010
- President: Mehmet Ali Talat
- Prime Minister: Derviş Eroğlu
- Preceded by: Erdoğan Şanlıdağ
- Succeeded by: Kemal Dürüst

Member of the Assembly of the Republic
- In office 19 April 2009 – 23 January 2022
- Constituency: Gazimağusa (2009, 2013, 2018)

Personal details
- Born: 1966 (age 59–60) Famagusta, Cyprus
- Party: National Unity Party
- Education: University of Trakya

Hamza Ersan Saner (born 1966) served as the Prime Minister of Northern Cyprus from 9 December 2020 to 5 November 2021.

President Ersin Tatar gave the task of establishing the government on 7 November 2020 to Ersan Saner, as he would temporarily serve as its chair until the National Unity Party Congress. After 14 days of contacts with other political parties, he was unable to form a government and returned the post on 21 November 2020. After the Leader of the Republican Turkish Party, Tufan Erhürman, who was given the task of forming the government, could not form the government, Ersan Saner was assigned to form the government for the second time on 7 December 2020. On 8 December 2020, the National Unity Party - Democratic Party and the Rebirth Party Coalition Government protocol was signed. He became the Prime Minister of Northern Cyprus when the list of ministers was approved by the President of the Republic Ersin Tatar on 9 December 2020.

== Early life and education ==
Saner was born in 1966 in Famagusta. He graduated from Trakya University, Department of Architecture in the year 1988. Saner is married and has 2 children and speaks English.

== Resignation ==
Saner was under pressure to resign after a video emerged of him masturbating while speaking to a scantily clad woman on the video app FaceTime.

On 13 October 2021, Saner informed President Tatar that his government has resigned. Per the Constitution of Northern Cyprus, he remained in office as the caretaker Prime Minister until the formation of a new government under Faiz Sucuoğlu.

Political offices
Preceded by Ersin Tatar	Prime Minister of Northern Cyprus; 2020–2021	Succeeded by Faiz Sucuoğlu
