= Kadri Fellahoğlu =

Turkish Cypriot politician

Kadri Fellahoğlu (born 1957) is a Turkish-Cypriot politician, who was the mayor of the capital of Northern Cyprus, North Nicosia's Nicosia Turkish Municipality (Turkish: Lefkoşa) between 2013 and 2014. He was born in Paphos.

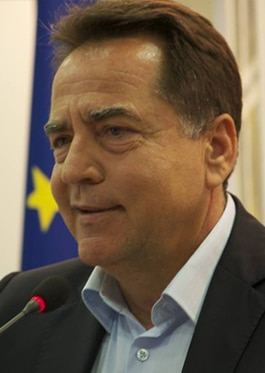
Kadri Fellahoğlu

Political offices
Preceded by Cemal Metin Bulutoğluları	Mayor of Turkish Nicosia; 2013–2014	Succeeded by Mehmet Harmancı
