= Nicosia Turkish Municipality =

Municipal administration of North Nicosia

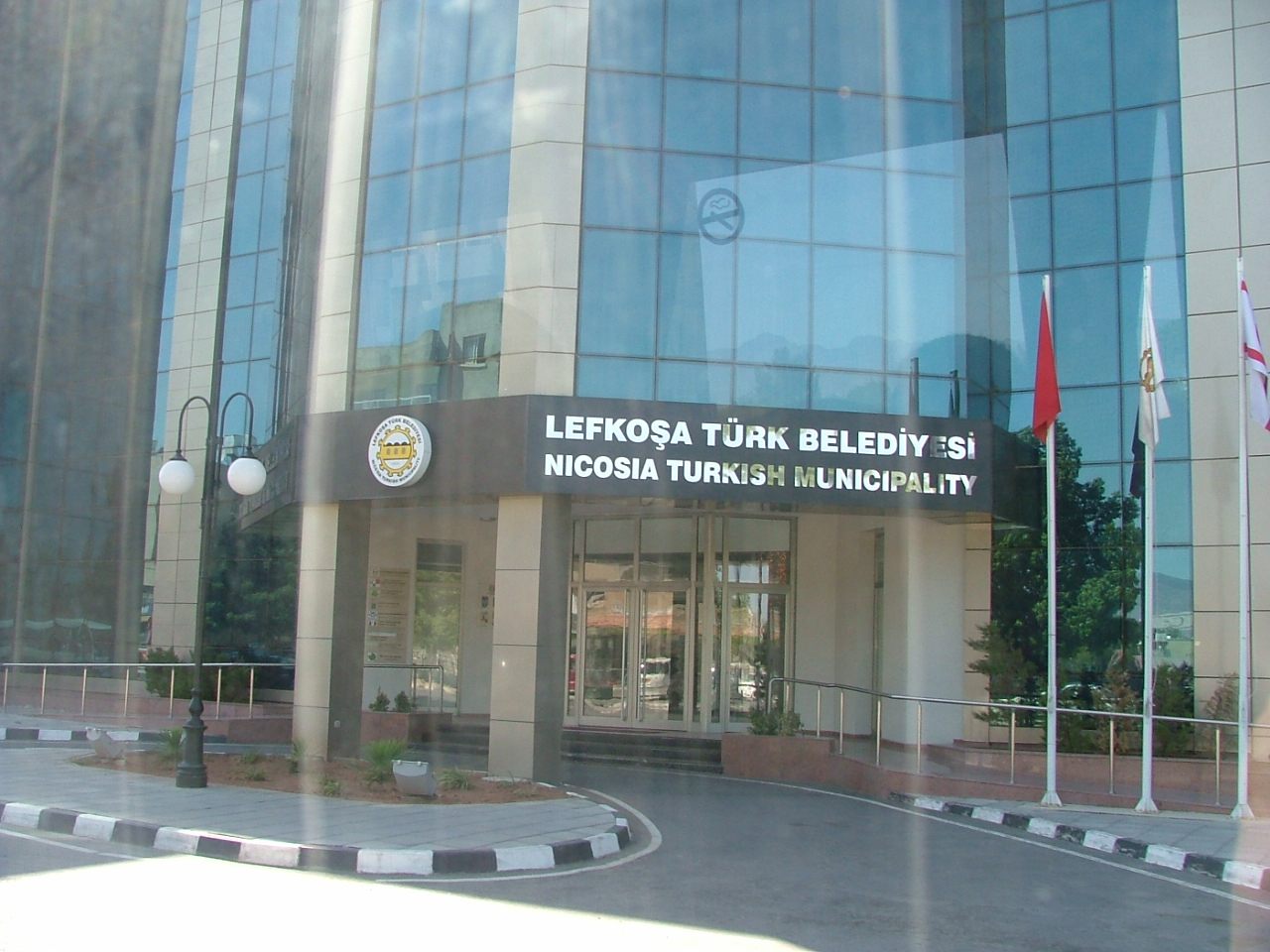
The building of Nicosia Turkish Municipality

Nicosia Turkish Municipality (Turkish: Lefkoşa Türk Belediyesi) is the governing body of North Nicosia province of TRNC. It was established in 1958 and was recognized by Article 173 of the Constitution of the Republic of Cyprus. After 1974 and the Turkish invasion of Cyprus, it became the municipality of North Nicosia. The current mayor is Mehmet Harmancı.

== Mayors of North Nicosia ==
Below is a list of "mayors" of the Nicosia Turkish Municipality since its establishment in 1958:

No	Name Surname	Took office	Left office	Party
1	Tahsin Gözmen	1958	1961	
2	Cevdet Mirata	1961	1962	
3	Fuat Celalettin	1962	1969	
4	Ziver Bodamyalızade	1969	1976	
5	Mustafa Akıncı	1976	1990	
6	Burhan Yetkili	1990	1994	
7	Şemi Bora	1994	2002	
8	Kutlay Erk	2002	2006	Republican Turkish Party
9	Cemal Metin Bulutoğluları	2006	11 January 2013	Democratic Party
10	Kadri Fellahoğlu	8 April 2013	27 June 2014	Republican Turkish Party
11	Mehmet Harmancı	30 June 2014	incumbent	Communal Democracy Party

== See also ==
- Nicosia Municipality
