= Atatürk Teacher Training Academy =

- Atatürk Öğretmen Akademisi
- Established: 1937
- President: Prof. Güner Konedralı
- Location: Nicosia, North Cyprus
- Website: www.aoa.edu.tr

Atatürk Teacher Training Academy (Turkish: Atatürk Öğretmen Akademisi) is a higher education institution in Nicosia, North Cyprus. The academy was founded in 1937 by the ruling British government in Cyprus as the Morphou Teacher Training College. It is accredited as a university by YÖK, the Council of Higher Education of Turkey, and YÖDAK, The Higher Education Planning, Evaluation, Accreditation and Coordination Council of Northern Cyprus. Atatürk Teacher Training Academy is the oldest active higher education institution in Cyprus.

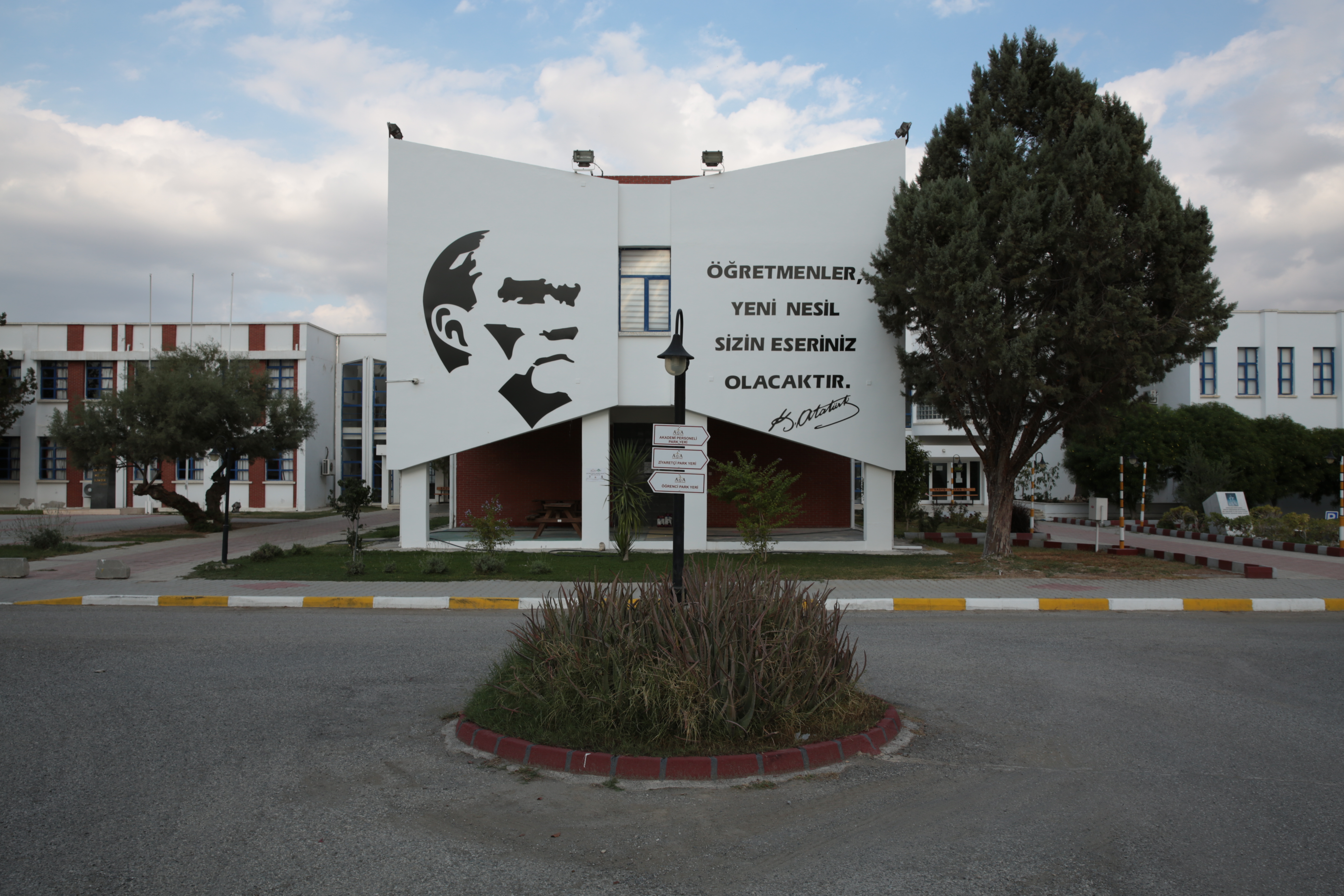
Ataturk Teacher Training Academy front view

== History ==
Morphou Teacher Training College (Omorfo Öğretmen Koleji) was established as a two-year institution by the ruling British, offering teacher training in English both for Greek Cypriots and Turkish Cypiots, with graduates qualifying as primary teachers, in 1937. The college was not popular amongst the Orthodox Church since they preferred to handle the education of Greek Cypriot teachers by themselves. In 1943, a new institution was formed to train Greek Cypriot women, however Turkish Cypriot women were also admitted after 1948. Following the intercommunal violence in 1958, Greek Cypriots withdrew from the institution and moved into a new college in Nicosia, the Teacher Training College.

British government moved the Morphou Teacher Training College to Terra Santa, Strovolos in Nicosia and named it as the Turkish Teacher Training College (Türk Öğretmen Koleji) in 1958. The school later moved to the Turkish Cypriot quarters of Nicosia in 1969. The school moved to Kyrenia in 1974, Kuchuk Kaimakli in 1990, and Yeni Jami in 1994 before settling down to its current location in Dumlupınar, Kuchuk Kaimakli in 1999. The Assembly of the Republic passed a new law in 2000, giving it an academy status and renaming it to Atatürk Teacher Training Academy (Atatürk Öğretmen Akademisi).

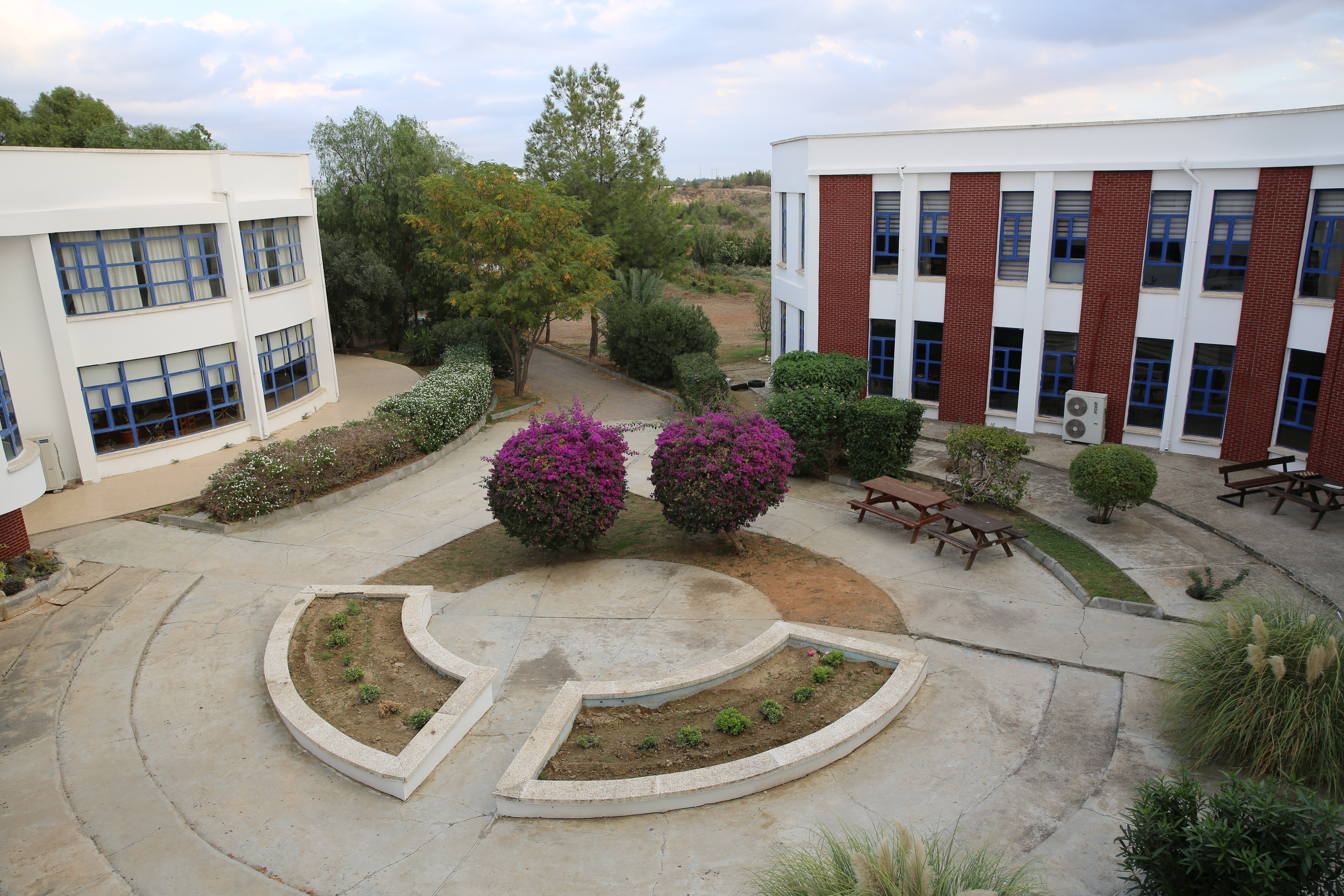
Ataturk Teacher Training Academy garden

== Today ==
Atatürk Teacher Training Academy offers two undergraduate and one graduate programmes. The students are admitted through an entrance exam and interviews held by the university and the Ministry of Education and Culture. Students are trained to receive undergraduate degrees either in primary school education or in pre-school education. Public primary schools and pre-school institutions only employ the graduates of these programmes.

Public secondary education institutions only can employ teachers with pedagogic education. The Academy also offers a Master of Education degree for those who do not have the necessary qualifications.

== Administration ==
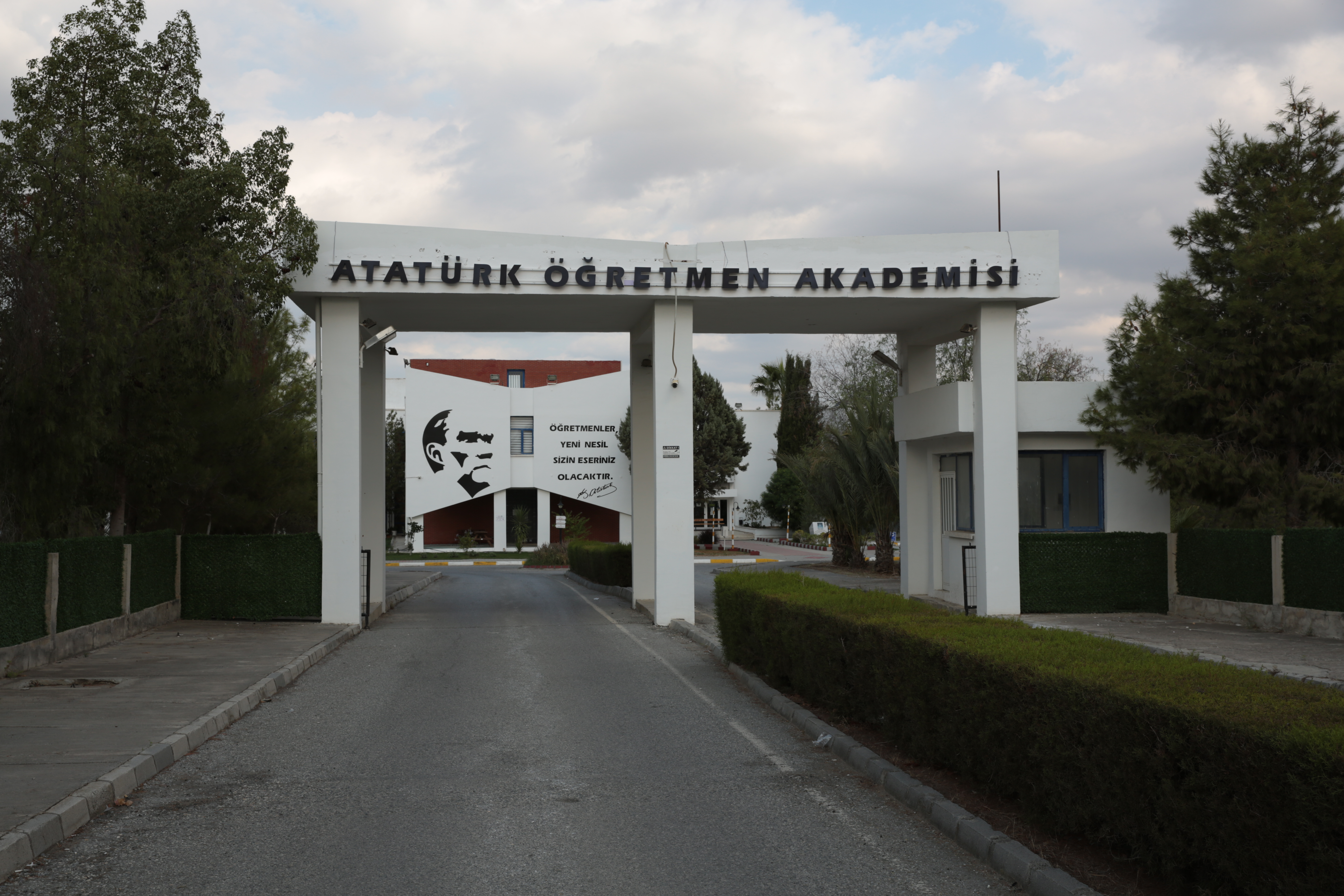
Ataturk Teacher Training Academy entrance

Atatürk Teacher Training Academy is governed by the five members who are appointed by the Council of Ministers directly. These members forms the Executive Committee and elects a president between them. The president must have the minimum academic title of Associate Professor, while must have worked in an academic position for at least five years.

The executive board appoints the Academy Presidential Board. The president of this board is named the President of the Academy and is the head of academic administration of the institution. The current President of the Academy is professor Güner Konedralı.

Title	Name
President of the Executive Board	Nazım Burgul
Member of the Executive Board	Hüseyin Azer Özkan
Member of the Executive Board	Murad Aktuğ
Member of the Executive Board	Hakkı Başarı
Member of the Executive Board	Fikret Deniz

== Notable alumni ==
- Cemal Özyiğit, teacher, trade unionist, Member of Parliament, Cabinet Minister for National Education and Culture
- Ahmet Derya, teacher, former Member of Parliament, former Cabinet Minister for National Education and Culture, former CEO of Cyprus Turkish Airlines
- Ahmet Yusuf Atamsoy, teacher, former Member of Parliament, former Cabinet Minister for Education, Youth, Culture and Sport
- Arif Hasan Tahsin Desem, teacher, trade unionist, former Member of Parliament
- Burhan Nalbantoğlu, teacher, physician, former Member of Parliament for the Republic of Cyprus, former Substitute Member of Assembly of the Council of Europe
- Cenk Gürçağ, teacher, actor, chief of staff to the President
- Erol Erduran, teacher, writer, academician, journalist
- Esat Varoğlu, teacher, trade unionist, former Member of Parliament
- Halit Ali Rıza, teacher, former Member of Parliament for the Republic of Cyprus, former Member of Assembly of the Council of Europe
- Hüseyin Avkıran Alanlı, teacher, former Member of Parliament, former Vice Speaker of Parliament
- Hüseyin Gültekin, teacher, former Member of Parliament
- İltaç Karayel, teacher, football manager, former footballer, former Member of Parliament
- Kemal Emirzade, teacher, former Member of Parliament, former mayor of Morphou
- Macit Cevdet, teacher, former Member of Parliament
- Mazlum Mercan, teacher, Member of Lefke Municipality Council
- Mehmet Özbilgehan, teacher, former football referee, academician
- Mustafa Gökmen, teacher, former Member of Parliament, former Cabinet Minister for Environment, Natural Resources, Youth and Sport
- Neriman Cahit, teacher, trade unionist, poet, author
- Özker Özgür, teacher, trade unionist, former Member of Parliament, Cabinet Minister for State, former Deputy Prime Minister
- Tuğberk Emirzade, biologist, politician
- Turgut Mustafa Avşaroğlu, teacher, trade unionist, former Member of Parliament
- Vasvi Candan, teacher, former Member of Parliament
