= Sıla Usar İncirli =

Turkish Cypriot statesperson

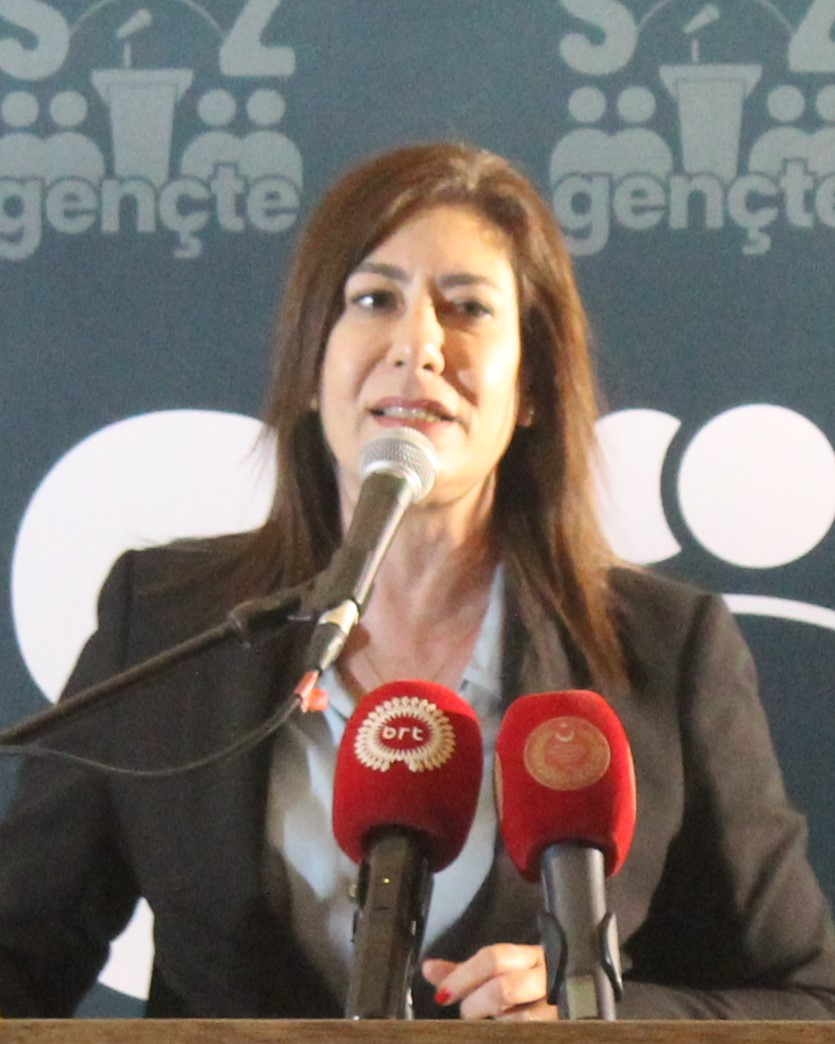
- İncirli in 2026

Leader of the Republican Turkish Party
- Incumbent
- Assumed office 30 November 2025
- Preceded by: Tufan Erhürman

Personal details
- Born: 15 December 1972 (age 53) Nicosia, Northern Cyprus
- Education: Hacettepe University

Sıla Usar İncirli (née Usar, born 15 December 1972) is a Turkish Cypriot neurologist, politician, researcher and trade unionist. She was elected as a member of the Assembly of the Republic of Northern Cyprus in 2018, and was later elected as the leader of the Republican Turkish Party in 2025.

== Early life and professional career ==
Usar İncirli was born in Nicosia, in 1972 to Naci Talat Usar and Vesile Usar (née Vehbi). She attended the Şehit Tuncer Primary School. She graduated from the Türk Maarif Koleji, and started her medical degree in the Hacettepe University of Ankara in 1990, aged 17.

She graduated from the Hacettepe University in 1996 and completed her training to become a specialist in neurology in the İbni Sina Hospital of Ankara University in 2001. She returned to Cyprus in 2002, to work for the Dr. Burhan Nalbantoğlu State Hospital in Nicosia. She was appointed to be the Chief for the Clinic of Neurology of the hospital in 2015. She has been contributing to a variety of researches based on Northern Cyprus in the field of neurology, epidemiology and pathology. She is known for her work on multiple sclerosis, a common demyelinating disease in Northern Cyprus.

Following the 2018 parliamentary election, it was speculated that Usar İncirli was going to be appointed as the Minister of Health for Erhürman cabinet. However she refused the role citing multiple reasons including a lack of practitioners in her field and her desire of continuing her profession rather than being a member of cabinet.

Sıla Usar İncirli became the new leader of the Republican Turkish Party (CTP) on November 30, 2025, after securing 52% of the votes at the party congress following the ascension of Tufan Erhürman to the Presidency.

== Political and trade union career ==
She became the president of Turkish Cypriot Physicians' Union (Tıp-İş), the main trade union of physicians working for state hospitals in Northern Cyprus, in 2015. She received public attention following the strike action by her union in 2017.

She became a candidate of Republican Turkish Party for the 2018 parliamentary election after receiving an invitation from Tufan Erhürman. She was elected as a Member of Parliament, obtaining a seat for Nicosia. She was expected to be the minister of health but chose continuing her profession over the cabinet position.

Usar İncirli appointed by her party to be a member of the Parliamentary Committee for Petitions and Ombudsman, and the Parliamentary Committee for Administrative, Public and Health Works on 15 February 2018.

== Family and personal life ==
Sıla Usar İncirli is married and has a son. She speaks English and French in addition to Turkish.

=== Usar family ===
She is the third person from the Usar family to become a Member of Parliament after her father and her uncle. Usar İncirli's late father, Naci Talat Usar was a famous politician and a figurehead to Turkish Cypriot left as the Secretary General of Republican Turkish Party. He died in 1991 after serving 15 years as a Member of Parliament. Her uncle, Salih Usar also served as a Member of Parliament for 10 years and as a cabinet minister for 4 years. Her brother, Talat Usar is a judge and the President of District Court of Nicosia.

=== Work with civil society ===
Starting from her years in secondary school, she was highly involved with civil society organisations. She worked as a part of executive committees for many different organisations including the Council of University Representatives, the Cyprus Turkish Neurological Sciences Society and the Cyprus Turkish Medical Association. She was also the head of the International Nicosia Old Town Jazz Festival in 2013 and 2014.

She is currently the President of Naci Talat Foundation.
