= Cemal Metin Bulutoğluları =

Turkish Cypriot politician

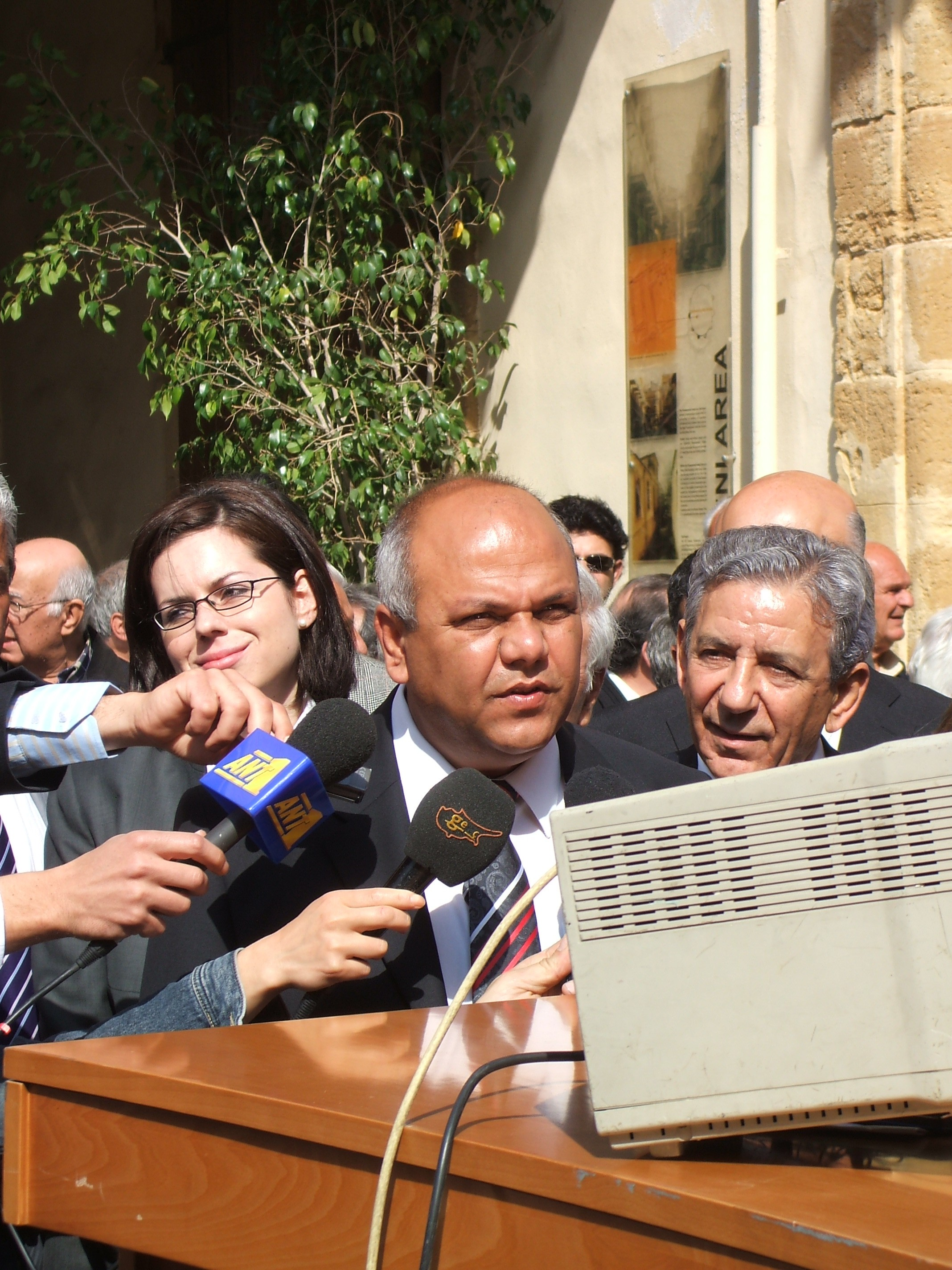
Cemal Metin Bulutoğluları is interviewed after having crossed the Green Line at the reopened Ledra Street on 3 April 2008

Cemal Metin Bulutoğluları (born September 2, 1960) is the mayor of the capital of Northern Cyprus, North Nicosia's Nicosia Turkish Municipality (Turkish: Lefkoşa). He was born in Nicosia. He lived his childhood in Ortaköy Marmara neighbourhood and graduated from the Nicosia Turkish High School in 1979. He graduated from Eastham College of Technology in England. Cemal Metin Bulutoğluları is married with two children. He speaks fluent English.

Political offices
Preceded by Kutlay Erk	Mayor of Turkish Nicosia; 2006–2013	Succeeded by Kadri Fellahoğlu
