= Serdar Çam =

Turkish bureaucrat (born 1966)

- Born: March 30, 1966; Ankara, Turkey
- Education: Türk Maarif College; Middle East Technical University (BS); Boston University (MA); Marmara University (PhD)
- Known for: President of the Turkish Cooperation and Coordination Agency

Serdar Çam is a Turkish bureaucrat who is currently the president of Turkish Cooperation and Coordination Agency since his appointment in 2011.

== Early years ==
Çam was born in Ankara, Turkey. His father was a diplomat for the Ministry of Foreign Affair of Turkey, so he moved to Libya and then to France where he completed his primary education. He moved to Nicosia as his father was assigned to the Embassy of Turkey to the Turkish Republic of Northern Cyprus.

== Education ==
Çam completed his secondary education at the Türk Maarif Koleji. He received his bachelor's degree in chemical engineering from the Middle East Technical University. He earned a master's degree in management from the Boston University, followed up by a PhD in international marketing from the Marmara University.

== Career ==
Upon the completion of his education, Çam worked as a high level executive for numerous companies and lectured at the Fatih University

He was appointed by Recep Tayyip Erdoğan, then-Prime Minister of Turkey, to be the Chief of Cabinet of his Office in the Grand National Assembly of Turkey in September 2002. He became the Chief of Cabinet for the Speaker of the Grand National Assembly in August 2009, during the tenure of Mehmet Ali Şahin.

He was appointed by Prime Minister Binali Yıldırım, to be the president of Turkish Cooperation and Coordination Agency on June 5, 2011.

Serdar Çam is a member of the executive committee of Yunus Emre Institute and a member of the board of trustees of Ahmet Yesevi University since May 9, 2015.

== Personal life ==
Serdar Çam is married to Lütfiye Selva Çam who is currently serving her second term as a Member of Parliament for Ankara. He met with Recep Tayyip Erdoğan, now the president of Turkey through a common friend and was later employed by him. It is claimed that he is amongst the closest people to Erdoğan. Çam is fluent in English, French and German.

Çam is a member of Independent Industrialists and Businessmen Association (MÜSİAD). He served as the Deputy Secretary General of MÜSİAD from 1996 to 1999.
