= Girne American University =

University

Coordinates: 35.332291°N 33.275732°E

- Turkish: Girne Amerikan Üniversitesi
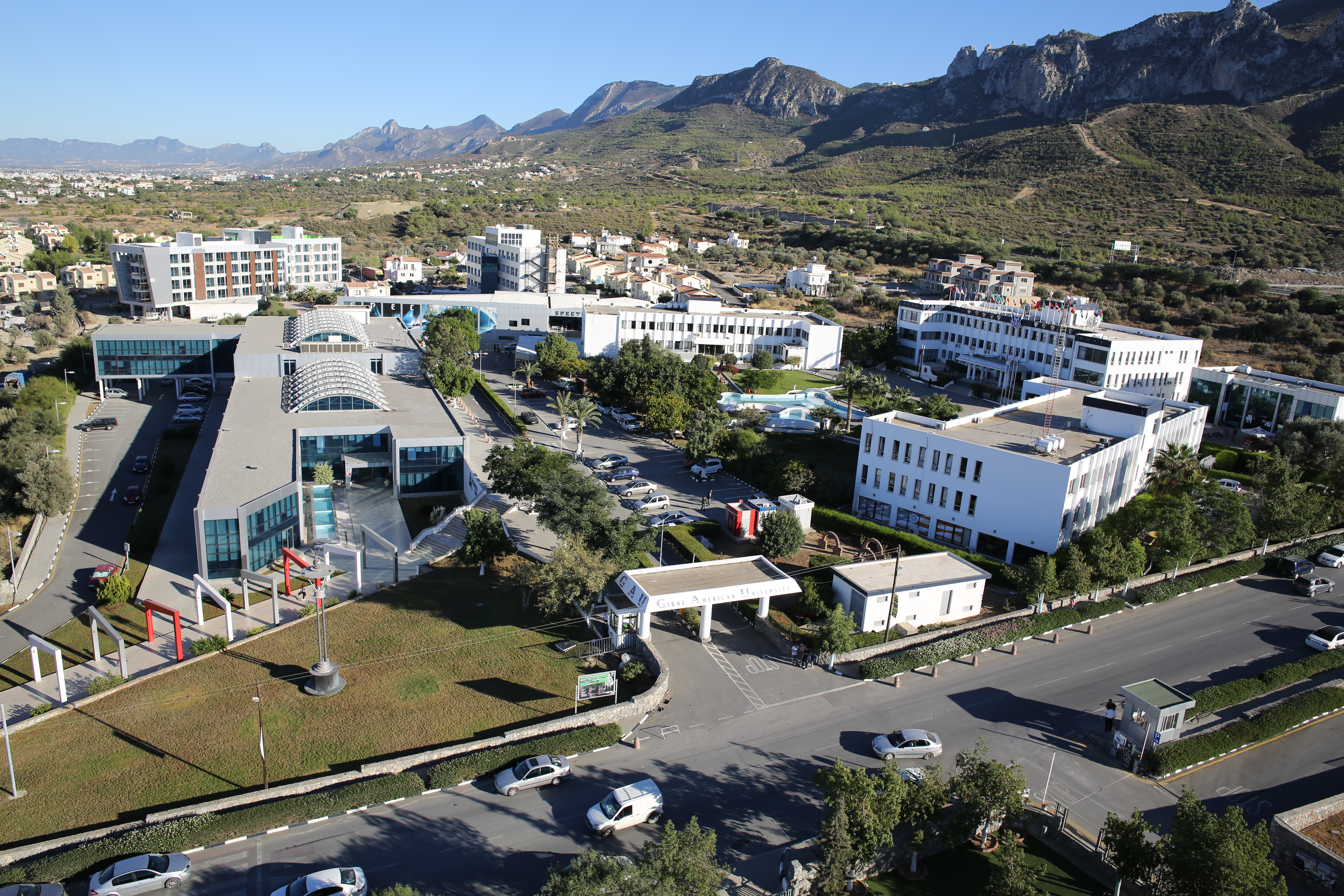
- Girne American University in Girne, Northern Cyprus
- Other names: The American University, Girne
- Motto: Latin: Discendo Vivimus
- Motto in English: We live through learning
- Type: Non-profit university
- Established: 1985; 41 years ago
- Affiliations: Caucasus University Association
- Chancellor: Mr. Serhat Akpinar
- Rector: Prof. Dr. Serdar Yurtsever
- Students: 18,000
- Location: Girne, Northern Cyprus
- Website: www.gau.edu.tr

Girne American University (Turkish: Girne Amerikan Üniversitesi) is the first university in the de facto state of Northern Cyprus. The university was founded in 1985 by Serhat Akpınar with the name of University College of Northern Cyprus (UCNC) as an affiliated campus of Southeastern University (Washington, D.C.) to offer higher education in American traditions. It is part of YÖDAK, the higher education coordinating council of Northern Cyprus and YÖK, its Turkish parallel.

== Faculties ==
- Faculty of Engineering includes five departments:
  - Civil Engineering
  - Computer Engineering
  - Electrical and Electronics Engineering
  - Industrial Engineering
  - Energy Systems Engineering
- Faculty of Business & Economics
- Faculty of Architecture, Design and Fine Arts. In 2013, the Faculty was announced as one of the top 10 Architecture Faculties in Turkey and North Cyprus by Mimari Medya (Architecture Media Network). In 2012 and 2013, the master programme in Construction Management was chosen by Eduniversal as one of the best 100 master programmes in the world. Established in 1985, the Faculty has 4 departments including:
  - Architecture
  - Interior Design
  - Graphic Design
  - Painting
- Faculty of Education
- Faculty of Communication
- Faculty of Humanities
- Faculty of Law
- Faculty of Health Sciences
- Graduate School of Science & Technology (Engineering Master & PhD Programs)
- Graduate School of Social Sciences (Master & PhD Programs)
- School of Applied Sciences
- Marine School
- Nursing School
- School of Sport and Recreation
- School of the Performing Arts

== Research centres ==
=== Research Centre for Applied Science, Engineering and Technology ===
In GAU Research Centers and Laboratories, advanced researches are performed in the fields of Applied Science, Engineering and Technology.

=== International Centre for Heritage Studies (ICHS) ===
The International Center for Heritage Studies (ICHS) is a research and design centre founded within the Faculty of Architecture, Design and Fine Arts (established since 2012) and is working on historical, landscape and archaeological research and the restoration project for the Acheiropoietos Monastery in Cyprus.

== International academic organizations ==
=== ISEAIA ===
The annual International Symposium on Engineering, Artificial Intelligence and Applications (ISEAIA) is a platform for researchers, practitioners, developers and educators to share their experiences in the fields of engineering, artificial intelligence and their applications in.

ISEAIA2013 was held between 6 and 8 November 2013 in Girne/Cyprus. ISEAIA2014 was held between 5 and 7 November 2014 in Girne/Cyprus.

=== CAUMME II ===
CAUMME, Contemporary Architecture and Urbanism in the Mediterranean and the Middle-East, is a series of conferences organized by AUMME. The 2nd CAUMME Conference organized by Girne American University, Yıldız Technical University and Qatar University in 2014. The organization of a biennial international symposium in different areas of architecture and urbanism constitutes the main academic activity of CAUMME series of conferences. The first CAUMME international symposium was held in 2012 at Yıldız Technical University. The main motivation of the second CAUMME international symposium was on the concept of Post-Professionalism.

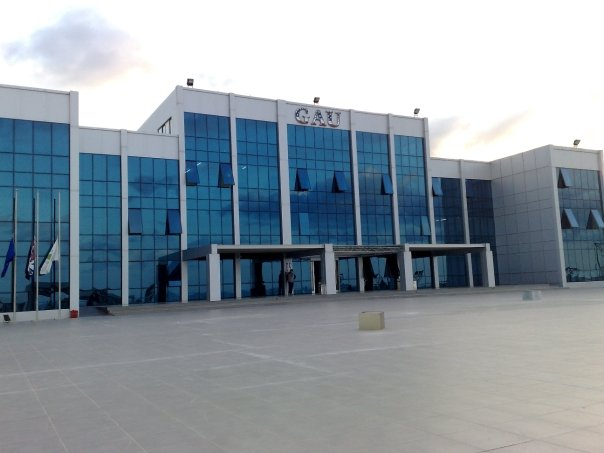

== Journal ==
Girne American University publishes a scientific journal called GAU Journal of Social and Applied Science.

== Notable alumni ==
- Asim Vehbi, Girne CEO and Vice-Chancellor

== Affiliations ==
The university is a member of the Caucasus University Association.
