= Hussein Chalayan =

Cypriot fashion designer

Hussein Chalayan MBE RDI
- Hüseyin Çağlayan
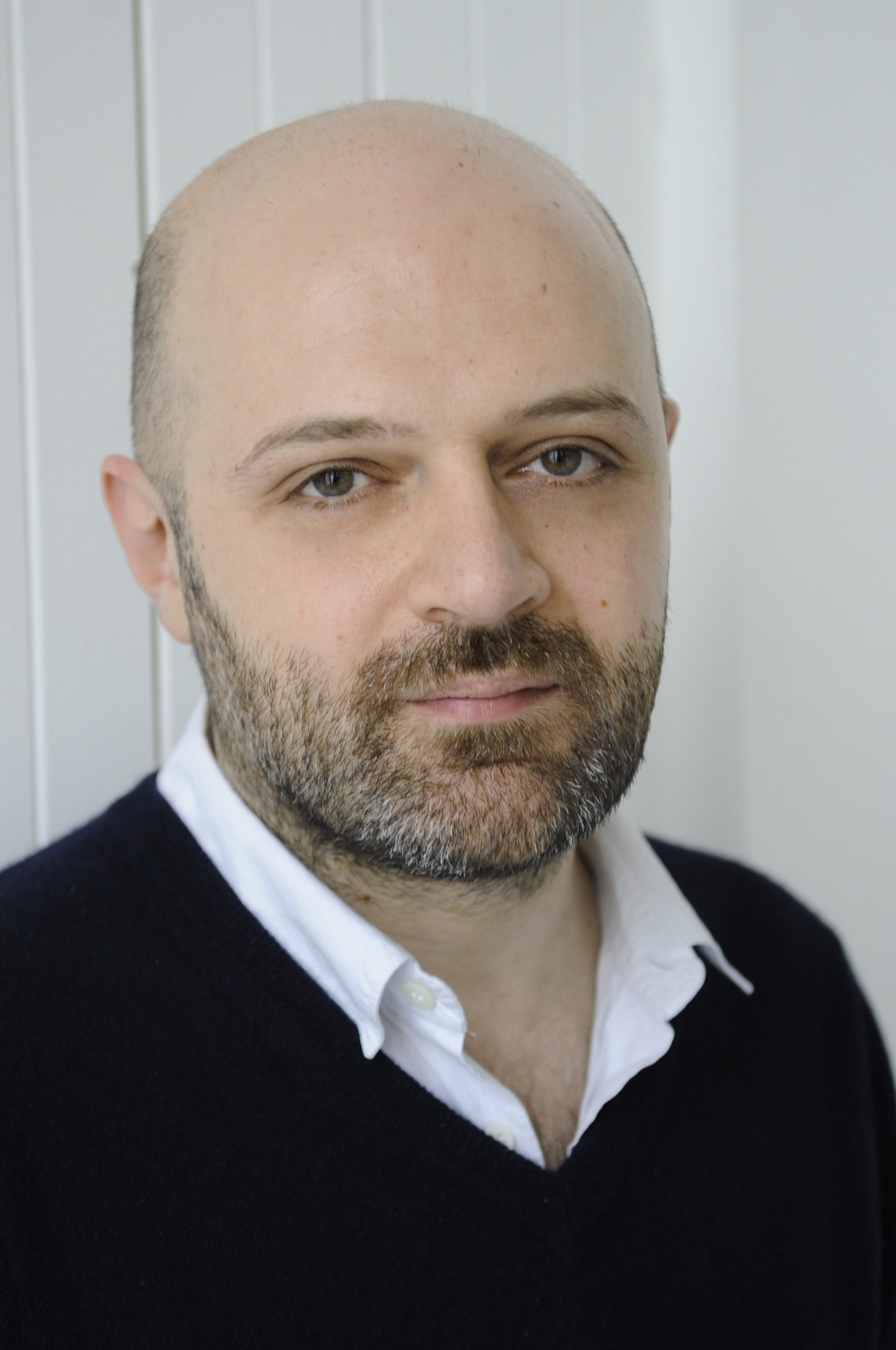
- Born: 12 August 1970 (age 56); Nicosia, Cyprus
- Education: Highgate School and Central St Martins
- Label: Hussein Chalayan
- Awards: 1995 Absolut Fashion Award, twice named British Designer of the Year

Hussein Chalayan, (/huːˈseɪn tʃəˈlaɪən/ hoo-SAYN chə-LY-ən; Turkish: Hüseyin Çağlayan [hyseˈjin tʃaːɫaˈjan]; born 12 August 1970) is a British-Cypriot fashion designer. He has won the British Designer of the Year twice (in 1999 and 2000), and he was awarded the MBE in 2006.

Chalayan currently teaches at HTW Berlin.

== Early life and education ==
Hussein Chalayan was born to Turkish Cypriot parents in Nicosia in 1970 and graduated from the Türk Maarif Koleji secondary school in his hometown. At that time, the population of the island was divided because of the constant struggles between the Greek and Turkish authorities. Ethnic conflicts between the Turkish and Greek Cypriot communities eventually led to the Turkish invasion of Cyprus and led to human right abuses towards civilians on both sides. For this reason, Chalayan and his family were forced to move to England in 1978.

After attending Highgate School, he studied for a National Diploma in fashion and clothing at the Warwickshire School of Arts, and proceeded to study Fashion Design at Central Saint Martins College of Art and Design in London. His graduate collection in 1993, titled "The Tangent Flows", contained clothes which he had buried in a backyard and exhumed just before the show where they were presented with an accompanying text that explained the process. The ritual of burial and resurrection was said to give the garments a dimension that referenced life, death, and urban decay. The work attracted the attention of the Browns fashion boutique in London, who borrowed the collection to feature in their window display.

== Early career ==
Chalayan established his own company in 1994, Cartesia Ltd., as well as his ready-to-wear line, Hussein Chalayan (which he changed in 2010 to just "Chalayan" because of the oriental connotation of his first name, Hussein).

== Professional career ==
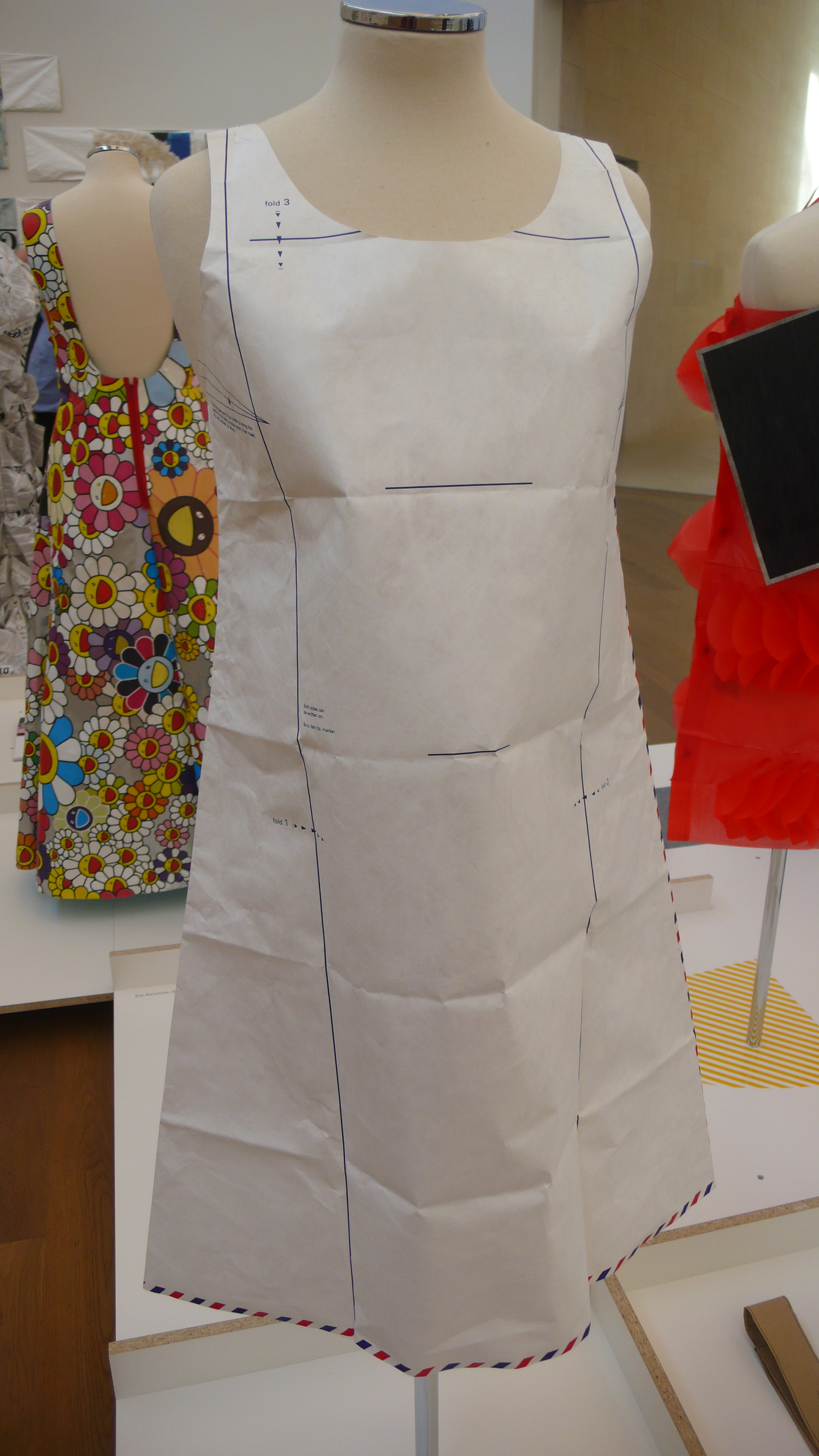
1993 Airmail Dress, paper designed to fold into an airmail envelope and be mailed.

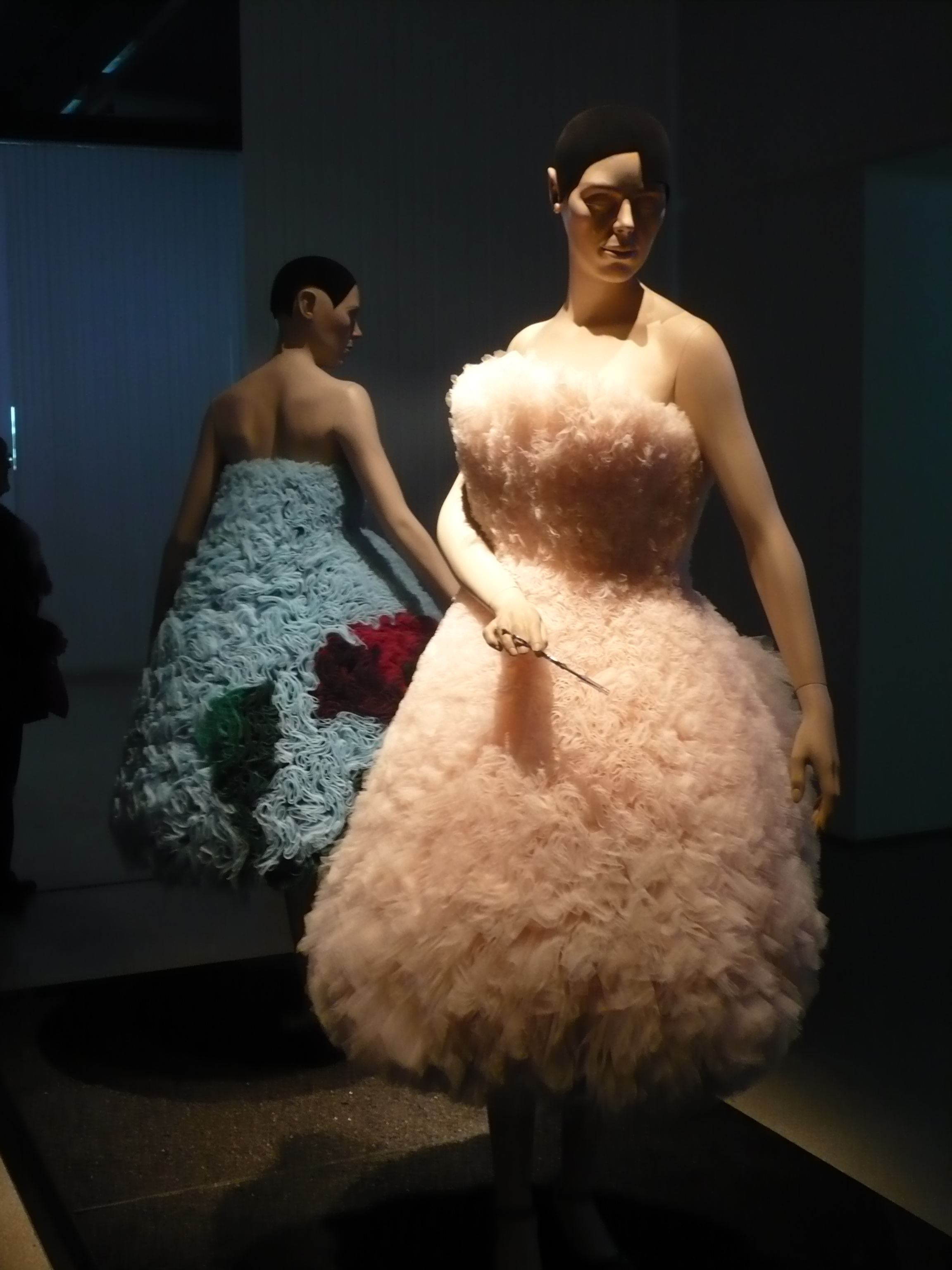
Sculpted tulle dresses displayed at the Design Museum in 2009.

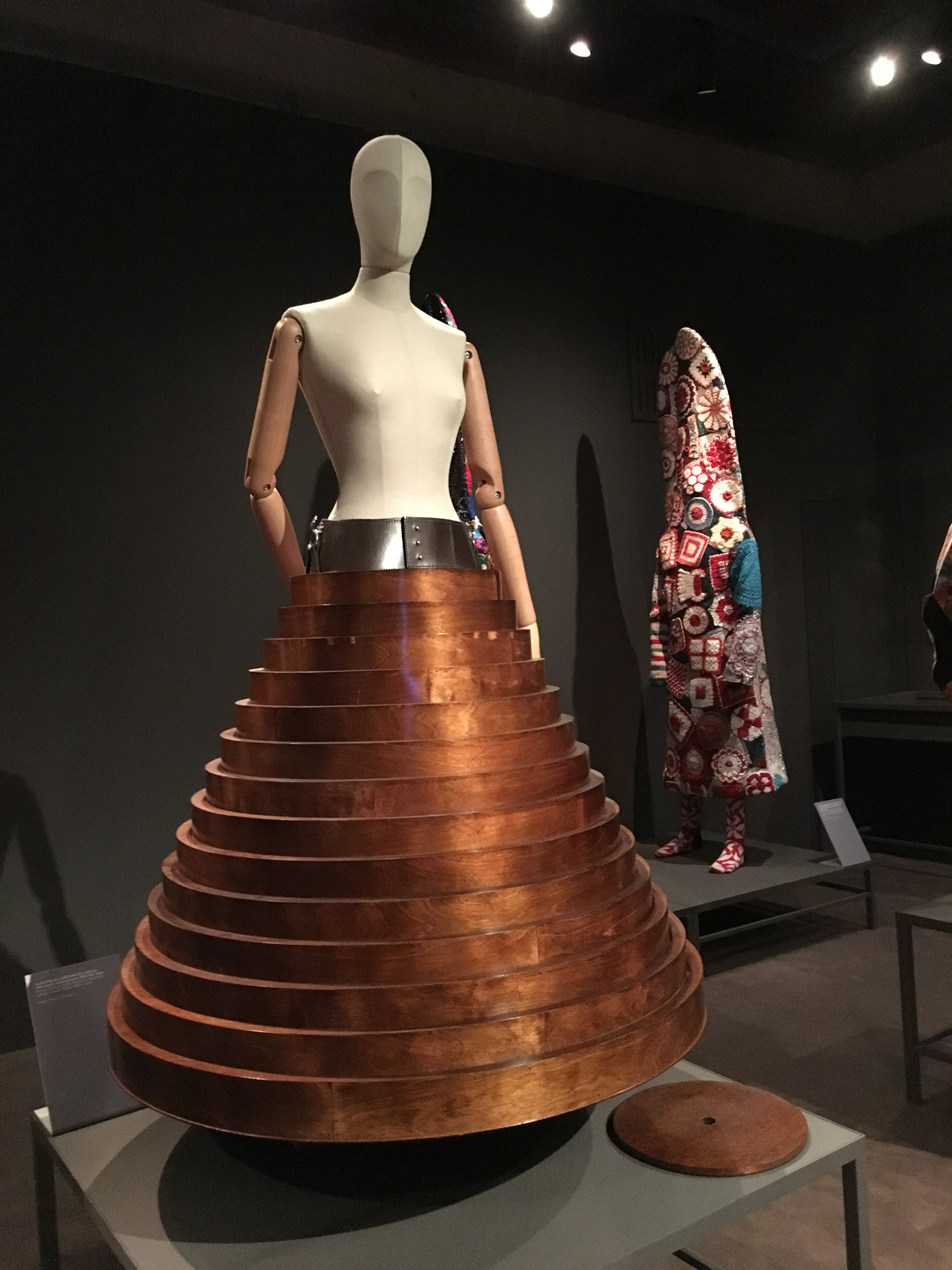
Coffee-table skirt, 2000.

Hussein Chalayan's fashion shows are characterised by minimal sets and a mood of suspense, incorporating elements of contemporary interiors, urban architecture, and geometric structures. In the shows, the conceptual and theoretical inspirations behind his garments are played out across the body.

In 1995 Chalayan clinched a London fashion design award organised by the company "Absolut". Chalayan won a £28,000 grant to develop creations for the British capital's Fashion Week in October 1995. In the same year, Chalayan worked with avant-garde star Björk, designing the jacket featured on the cover of her album Post. Björk's Post tour also featured several creations by Chalayan and Björk modelled for Chalayan in October 1995 for London Fashion week.

His collection Lands Without for Spring/Summer 1997 featured several "Kite" dresses, which were notable because of the way in which he directed the relationship between his garments and the body, and his use of architectural proportions to amplify their interplay with their surroundings.

In his collection Between for Spring/Summer 1998 he sent models onto the catwalk wearing black chadors of varying lengths and nothing else, alluding to fashion's continual shift of erogenous zones around the female body arising in response to changing ideals. The first was nude apart from a mask covering her face. Each veil became longer and longer until, finally, the last one wore a chador which covered most of her body and allowed a gap just for her eyes. According to Chalayan this piece was about defining cultural territory.

The Panoramic collection for Fall/Winter 1998 expressed the idea of infinity in a surreal cityscape of geometric forms and distorted images. The models were distorted into generic shapes and unified by architectural proportions; cones were fixed to the top of the head and faces and bodies swathed in black to obscure their identity. As Chalayan explored the idea of representing nature in this collection, he broke it down into its most basic graphic representation, pixels. Body and clothing were then merged into a digital landscape, which was recreated in enlarged cube-shaped pixels.

In the Autumn of 1998, while still designing his signature line, he was appointed as a design consultant for New York knitwear label TSE. His collaboration with them lasted till 2001 when the company decided not to renew his contract.

For his Echoform collection for Autumn/Winter 1999 Chalayan created leather dresses inspired by car interiors to represent externalising speed. He also mimicked aeroplane interiors by attaching padded headrests to dresses This project was based on exploring the relationship of the body's inherent mobility and aimed to evoke thoughts on speed, spatiality and well-being.

The Before minus now collection for Spring/Summer 2000 contained a series of architectural dresses which evolved from his collaboration with B Consultants, a London-based firm of architectural engineers. The dresses featured wire-frame architectural prints against static white backgrounds, generated by a computer program that allows designers to draw within a range of three-dimensional perspectives inside an architectural landscape. The images were then transferred onto silk and cotton fabrics using a mechanised fabric-printing process. This collection also featured the "Remote Control" dress which premiered at the Hyères Festival in France in 2000 and clearly illustrated Chalayan's interest in technology. The dress incorporated the aerodynamics of aeroplane travel into its form and aesthetic and was considered a hi-tech triumph that connected fashion to technology and technology to the body, establishing a dialogue between the body and the environment. The Remote Control dress was the first wireless device to be presented as a fully functioning fashion garment.

His Geotrophics collection for Spring/Summer 1999 had already featured Chair Dresses that represented the idea of a nomadic existence and a completely transportable environment. This concept was later expanded in Chalayan's After Words collection for Fall/Winter 2000. which included some of his most well-known designs such as ‘the coffee table dress'. In Afterwords, Hussein Chalayan focused on the involuntary and dramatic aspect of mobility, and illustrated the sentimental impacts of forced migration. Presented at Sadler's Wells theatre in London, the show featured a bare, white stage flanked by asymmetrical planes on three sides and contained 1950s-style furniture that the models adapted as clothing in the show's finale and either carried or wore off the stage. One of the models transforms a mahogany coffee table into a geometrical and telescopic skirt, so that it becomes displaceable on human body. The show was based on the idea of having to evacuate home during a time of war, hiding possessions when a raid was impending, and using clothing as the means to carry away possessions more quickly. The theme was an autobiographical expression of Chalayan's Turkish Cypriot roots and the political events that affected his childhood. However Chalayan does not merely illustrate the situation, he challenges the historical context in which the immigrants had to leave behind their possessions and lose their identity because of their un-portable quality of the objects. Since he designs the clothes as portable private properties, the immigrants can carry these items that define their identities and cultures with them during their unwanted journeys. This way he allows them a relatively more active position where they can adapt the physical nature to the social context. The Table Skirt and the entire set from the show were later featured in the 2001 Tate Modern's Century City exhibition in London.

Despite this attention and recognition for his work Chalayan struggled with sponsorship and funding, often receiving it from various other companies and his own country. TSE's decision not to renew his contract caused further financial difficulties as the designer amounted 250,000 pounds in debt and was forced to go into voluntary liquidation. Subsequently, he restructured his company and staged a comeback collection in 2001 without a catwalk presentation, and designed for high-street label Marks and Spencer to make ends meet. Italian clothing manufacturer Gibo also helped the designer as did British jeweller Asprey, who appointed him as their fashion director the same year.

He was crowned 'British Designer of the Year' in 1999 and 2000, and was awarded a Member of the Order of the British Empire (MBE) on 17 June 2006. International recognition also followed, where he was awarded the Design Star Honoree by The Fashion Group International at their annual Night of Stars Gala, New York in 2007.

In July 2002 Chalayan launched his first menswear collection, which was manufactured by Italian company Gibo. The exclusive rights of which were sold to internet retailer Yoox.com in 2007. After going through financial woes including having to move his studio three times and working from home with his team in-between, he announced plans to relocate his fashion shows to Paris. In 2004, he added another diffusion line to his expanding list of design duties.

In 2007 Chalayan donated a showpiece to the Fashion is Art exhibition in aid of radio station Capital 95.8's Help a London Child charity, which was sold at an exclusive auction in London.

In early 2008 Chalayan designed a series of laser LED dresses in collaboration with luxury label Swarovski, showcased in Tokyo.

On 28 February 2008, Chalayan was appointed as the creative director for German sportswear label Puma. Puma also purchased a majority stake in his label. The designer also collaborated with German hosiery and legwear label Falke to produce one-off footwear pieces for his Autumn/Winter 2008 collection showcased in Paris. In 2010, he bought back his brand from Puma.

In 2010 Chalayan opened his I Am Sad Leyla multimedia installation at Lisson Gallery in London.

Starting with the 2012 spring collections, the brand became known as Chalayan instead of Hussein Chalayan. The brand also launched a collection called Grey Label that was priced below the runway line.

On 13 February 2011, Chalayan and Nicola Formichetti collaborated with Lady Gaga at the 53rd Annual Grammy Awards.

In 2014 Chalayan was hired to design Vionnet's demi-couture line. He then joined the ready-to-wear creative team for Vionnet in 2015.

== Teaching ==
Chalayan joined the University of Applied Arts Vienna as the Head of Fashion of the Institute of Design in 2015.

In 2019 Chalayan became professor at the University of Applied Sciences Berlin (HTW Berlin) at fashion department with specialization on sustainability.

== Film ==
Apart from his fashion collections Chalayan has also been renowned for his short movies such as Absent Presence which represented Turkey at the 51st Venice Biennale in 2005 and Ambimorphous screened at Mode Natie in Antwerp in 2002.

== Solo and other exhibitions ==
- "Hussein Chalayan, The Box" art project commissioned by the Pippy Houldsworth Gallery (2013 May)
- Solo exhibition "Fashion Narratives" at Les Arts Decoratifs, Paris (2011 July – November)
- Installation "I Am Sad Leyla (Üzgünüm Leyla)" exhibited during a solo show at Lisson Gallery, London.
- Solo exhibition '1994–2010' at the Istanbul Modern (2010 July – October)
- Solo exhibition ' From Fashion and Back' at the Museum of Contemporary Art in Tokyo (2010 April – June)
- Hussein Chalayan: From Fashion and Back – Comprehensive selection of Hussein Chalayan's 15 years of work exhibited at the Design Museum, London (2009 January – May)
- Hussein Chalayan, 10 years of work retrospective exhibition, Groninger Museum, The Netherlands, then travelled to Wolfsburg, Germany. Sponsored by Turquality (2005 April – September)
- Echoform retrospective, Galerist, Istanbul (2003 April)
- Airmail clothing – Musee de la Mode, Palais du Louvre, Photography by Paul Wetherell, Graphics by Mike and Rebecca (1999 December)
- Solo exhibition at Collete, Paris (1998 Paris)
- Solo exhibition – The Window Gallery, Prague (1996 August – September)

== Awards ==
- 1995 Absolut Creation Award, Absolut Vodka (inaugural award)
- 1999 British Fashion Awards – Designer of the Year
- 2000 British Fashion Awards – Designer of the Year
- 2006 Hussein Chalayan awarded an MBE in the Queen's Birthday Honours List (June)
- 2007 Awarded Design Star Honoree by The Fashion Group International at their annual Night of Stars Gala, New York
- 2008 Brit Insurance Designs of the Year Award in the Fashion category for the A/W'07 Airborne collection
- 2008 A/W'07 LED Dress exhibited as part of the 100 nominations exhibition in the Design Museum, London
- 2009 Winner of Outstanding Lifetime Achievement to Design at the FX International Interior Design Awards, London
- 2012 Hussein Chalayan received Lucky Strike Designer Award from the Raymond Loewy Foundation
- 2013 "Fashion Visionary Award" for his 20 years of Design Excellence during Audi Fashion Festival, Singapore
