= İzlem Gürçağ Altuğra =

Northern Cypriot politician (born 1972)

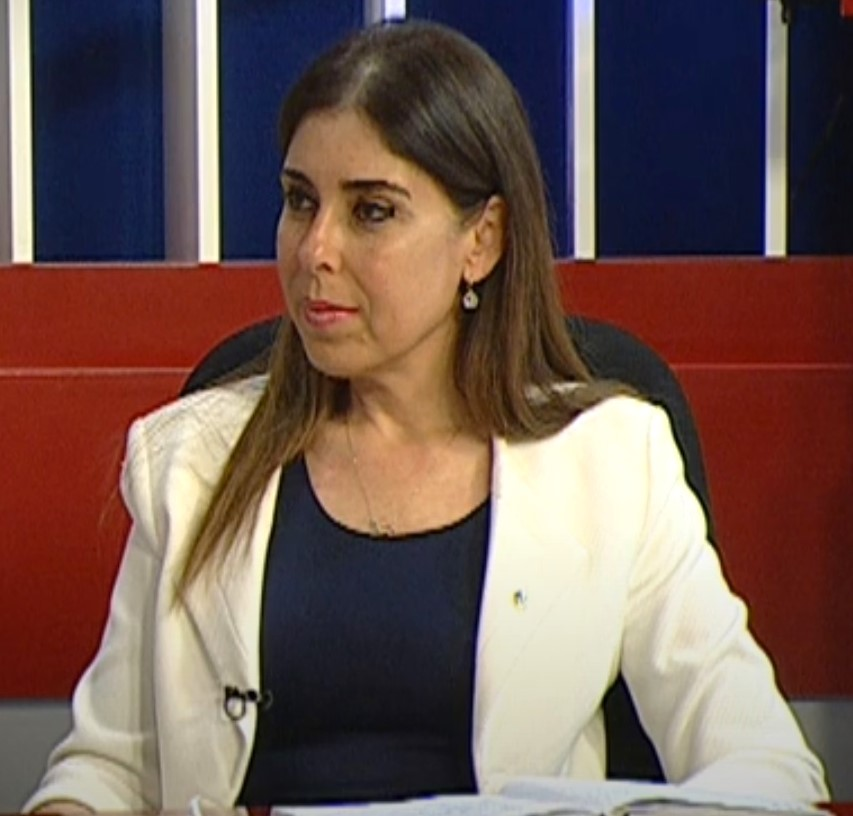
- Altuğra interviewed in 2020

Minister of Health
- In office 12 May 2022 – 11 August 2023
- Succeeded by: Hakan Dinçyürek

Member of the Assembly of the Republic
- Incumbent
- Assumed office 2013
- Constituency: Kyrenia

Personal details
- Born: İzlem Gürçağ; 1972 (age 53–54) Limassol, Cyprus
- Party: National Unity Party
- Children: 2
- Education: Hacettepe University
- Occupation: Politician; medical scientist

İzlem Gürçağ Altuğra (born 1972) is a Turkish Cypriot politician and medical scientist. Born in Limassol, she worked as a biologist before being elected as a National Unity Party MP at the 2013 Northern Cypriot parliamentary election. She spent three years as the head of Girne District between 2015 and September 2018 and fifteen months as Minister of Health between May 2022 and August 2023.

== Biography ==
Altuğra was born in 1972 in Limassol and educated at the Department of Biology of the Hacettepe University Faculty of Science. She has two children with her spouse. She worked as a biologist at Dr. Burhan Nalbantoğlu State Hospital in Nicosia and at Akçiçek Hospital in Kyrenia, before starting the medical analysis laboratory LAMEL. She was a board member in the women's branch of the National Unity Party (UBP). She was elected as a UBP MP for Kyrenia in the 2013 Northern Cypriot parliamentary election. In 2015, she was elected as the head of Girne District, the first woman to be so. In September 2018, after their UBP branch refused to hold elections for the executive board of their women’s branch, which she had opposed, Altuğra resigned as district president in protest. She was re-elected in the 2018 and 2022 Northern Cypriot parliamentary elections.

On 12 May 2022, Altuğra was appointed Minister of Health as part of the first Üstel cabinet. As Minister of Health, she conducted inspections of the State Laboratory Department and the Güzelyurt Health Center in 2022, and visited the construction site of the New Kyrenia Hospital in January 2023. In August 2022, Altuğra received congratulations for her new positions as health minister from Fahrettin Koca, the minister of health of Turkey, and later that month, opened the 2022 Northern Cypriot Women's Chess Championship. After the February 2023 Turkey–Syria earthquakes, she donated her salary for the month to earthquake relief. In May 2023, she congratulated Recep Tayyip Erdoğan for his re-election as president of Turkey after the 2023 Turkish presidential election. On 11 August 2023, Altuğra was replaced as minister by Hakan Dinçyürek when Ünal Üstel started a new cabinet.

In September 2023, Altuğra was present at the sixth death anniversary memorial service of MP Mustafa Hacıahmetoğlu. In October 2023, in response to a counterfeit prescription scandal in the country, she supported drug monitoring and the creation of a qualified pharmaceutical facility within Northern Cyprus, warning that "if we do not produce, we will be destroyed". In February 2024, she criticized the rise of land investments by "third nationality" foreigners, saying that "our country has become foreigners' country" and that "the irregularity in land sales has made us foreigners". In June 2024, Altuğra was a speaker at the TURKPA Women Parliamentarians Group.
