= Türk Maarif College =

Turkish Education College
- Türk Maarif Koleji
- Turcorum Educationem Collegium

Location
- Okullar Yolu; Kizilbash; Nicosia; Northern Cyprus; 35°11′33.155″N 33°21′51.184″E

Information
- School type: Public school Selective school
- Motto: Turkish: 50 Altın Yıl (50 Golden Years)
- Established: 1964; 62 years ago
- Headmaster: Erol Muhtaroğlu (T)
- Teaching staff: 128
- Grades: 7
- Years offered: Year 6–12
- Gender: Co-educational
- Enrollment: 1038
- Language: English
- Hours in school day: 8hrs and 5mins (Mon); 5hrs and 10mins (Tue-Fri)
- Campus size: 6 acres
- Colours: Navy Blue and Gold
- National ranking: 1
- Publication: TMK Times; Contemporary Physics
- Website: http://turkmaarifkoleji.org

Türk Maarif College (Turkish pronunciation: [ˈtyɾc maaɾif koleʒi]), commonly referred to as Kolej, is a selective secondary public school in Nicosia, Northern Cyprus. Access to the school is only open to students with top score in a nationwide entrance exam. It is an English-medium school.

The school is famous with their performative academic programs, consecutively receiving national and international awards. The school engages scholars to be pro-active in sports, musical competitions and science olympiads.

The school follows the English curriculum, preparing students for the International General Certificate of Secondary Education and the GCE Advanced Level examinations. However, students are allowed to follow the Turkish curriculum from Year 10 if they choose to prepare for Yükseköğretim Kurumları Sınavı. All students receive Devlet Lise Diploması (State Lycee Diploma) following their graduation.

== History ==
The school was founded on 27 January 1964 by Hasan Nevzat and two teachers Behzat Gürsel and Mahmut İslamoğlu all teaching members at the English School in Nicosia, which had remained in the Greek Cypriot controlled side after intercommunal fighting between Turkish Cypriots and Greek Cypriots in December 1963. The school was established as a private school in a rented house in the Köşklüçiftlik area and later extended to a ruined church with four classrooms. The school was primarily set up as an English-medium school modelled on the English School, preparing students for the UK GCE examinations. It was then called Kösklüçiftlik English School (Turkish: Köşklüçiftlik İngiliz Okulu).

Eventually, the school moved to the Victoria Girls High School building near the Atatürk Square, and then transferred to the old Commercial Lycee next to the Haydar Pasha Mosque. In 1968, it was turned over to the Turkish Education Office and its name was changed to the English College (Turkish: İngiliz Koleji). Until 1973, the school did not award a diploma to its graduates. Due to the changes made in the entrance to Turkish universities, the school's name was changed once again to Turkish Educational College (Turkish: Türk Maarif Koleji) in 1973, and the school was authorised to award high school diplomas to its graduates. The school moved to its present location in 1974 which was previously used by an old Greek Cypriot High School, Gymnasio Neapolis in Kizilbash. After 1991 the secondary school portion (first, second, and third forms) moved to another building (as a separate school, Bayraktar Turk Maarif Koleji, leaving the high school portion (fourth, fifth and sixth forms). In academic year 2009-2010, the secondary school moved back onto the main premises at Okullar Yolu Street, which remains the current location of the school.

=== Head teachers ===
1. 1964–1967 Mr. Hasan Nevzat
2. 1967–1969 Mr. Selim Inan
3. 1969–1980 Mr. Sacit Nereli
4. 1980–1980 Mr. Vural Aşıcıoğlu (Acting Headmaster)
5. 1980–1990 Mr. Şinasi Tekman
6. 1990–1990 Mr. Recai Deren (Acting Headmaster)
7. 1990–1993 Mr. Erdogan Şensoy
8. 1993–2001 Mrs. Emine Beton
9. 2001–2019 Mr. Fehmi Tokay
10. 2019–2020 Mr. Erol Muhtaroğlu (Acting Headmaster)
11. 2020–present Mrs. Candan Kortay

== Athletics ==
Türk Maarif College has a highly successful athletics programme. Even though the school does not offer any athletic scholarships, the varsity teams earn top national ranks in multiple disciplines.

=== 2016-2017 national honours ===
Only teamwise top three results are listed

- First place in high school girls' chess
- First place in high school mixed chess
- First place in high school boys' swimming
- First place in high school girls' table tennis
- First place in high school boys' tennis
- First place in secondary school girls' chess
- First place in secondary school mixed chess
- First place in secondary school boys' futsal
- First place in secondary school boys' table tennis
- First place in secondary school boys' tennis
- Second place in high school boys' basketball
- Second place in high school boys' judo
- Second place in high school girls' swimming
- Second place in secondary school girls' table tennis
- Second place in secondary school girls' tennis
- Third place in secondary school boys' basketball
- Third place in high school girls' cross country running
- Third place in secondary school boys' swimming
- Third place in secondary school girls' swimming

== Notable alumni ==
- Tufan Erhürman — President of Northern Cyprus, former Prime Minister of Northern Cyprus, Member of Parliament
- Serdar Denktaş — Member of Parliament, Cabinet Minister for Finance, former Deputy Prime Minister, former Acting Prime Minister of Northern Cyprus
- Özdil Nami — Member of Parliament, Cabinet Minister for Economy and Energy, former Chief Negotiator
- Raşit Pertev — Poet, author, former Chief Negotiator, former Cabinet Minister, former Secretary General of World Federation of Farmers, former Undersecretary for the Office of the President
- Mehmet Harmancı — Mayor of North Nicosia, former Cabinet Minister
- Hasan Taçoy — Member of Parliament, former Cabinet Minister
- Mustafa Djamgoz — Professor of cancer biology at Imperial College London, Chairman of the College of Medicine's Science Council
- Tahsin Ertuğruloğlu — Former Member of Parliament, former Cabinet Minister
- Raif Denktaş — Composer, journalist, academic, former Member of Parliament, former Political Adviser to the President
- Neşe Yaşın — Poet and author
- Suat Günsel — Founder of Near East University
- Hussein Chalayan, MBE, RDI — Fashion designer and two-times recipient of the British Designer of the Year Award

== Sister schools ==
- Pertevniyal High School
- Yeşilköy 50th Year Anatolian High School
