= Asım Vehbi =

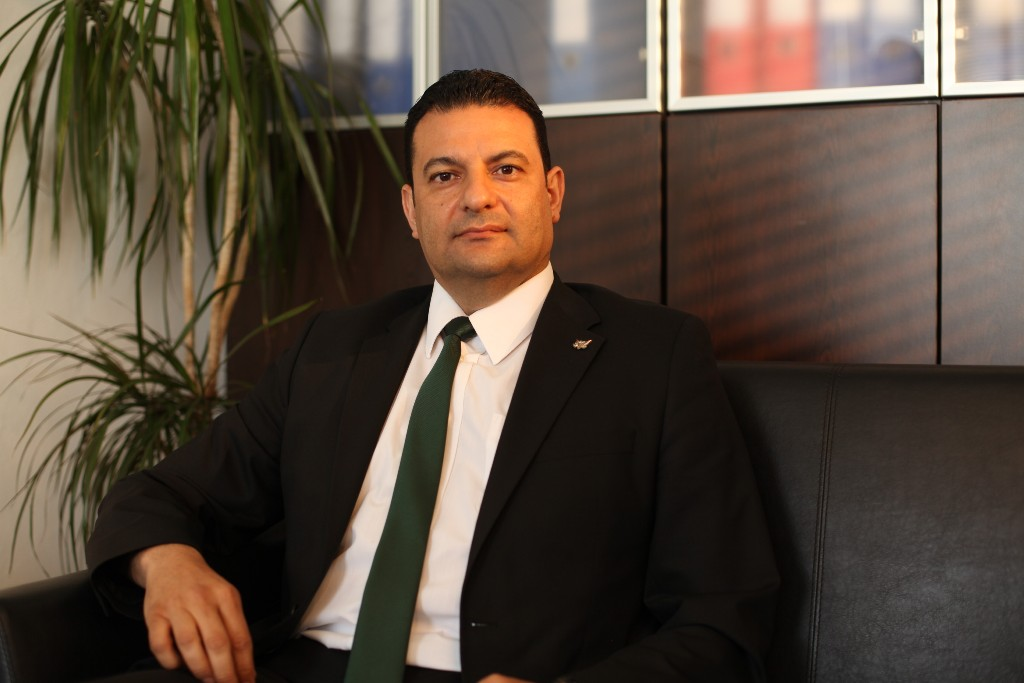
Asım Vehbi

Asim Vehbi (born 1966 in Nicosia) is a Turkish academic who is the CEO and Vice-Chancellor of Girne American University. He has also served as the former Minister of Environment and Natural Resources of the Turkish Republic of North Cyprus.

== Biography ==
In 2004, Vehbi work at Girne American University (GAU) as vice-chair of the board of directors and was appointed in 2012 as chief executive officer.

Between 2006 and 2008 he was the Minister of Environment and Natural Resources and as the Cyprus International University (CIU) President.
