= Erol Erduran =

Turkish Cypriot writer (1932–2011)

Erol Erduran was an influential Turkish Cypriot educator and writer. Erduran was born on 4 November 1932 in Larnaca, Cyprus and died on 5 August 2011 in Bristol, England. He represented the Turkish Cypriot community on the Fulbright Commission and worked closely with other international agencies including the British Council and the Goethe Institute.

== Early life ==
The early influence on Erduran's teaching philosophy was his father Hasan Nihat, a well-respected teacher and leader whose fellow villagers dedicated a street in his name in northern Cyprus 60 years after his death. An obituary of Hasan Nihat was written by Talat Yurdakul and published in the Halkın Sesi newspaper on 17 August 1948.

== Education ==
Erduran was trained at Morphou Teachers' College, and subsequently taught in several village schools in Cyprus, including at Sinde and Küçük Kaymaklı. He was one of the first Cypriot teachers to be granted a scholarship to study in the UK, where he completed a Diploma in Teaching English as a foreign language at the University of Wales, Cardiff in 1962.

== Teaching career ==
Following his return to Cyprus, Erduran moved onto secondary school teaching at several schools including Nicosia Girls’ School where he taught for almost 20 years. Apart from Primary and Secondary School Teaching, Erduran's career included Director of In-Service Teacher Training and Instructor at Anadolu Open University campus in Northern Cyprus. He was a visiting teacher at George Mason University, USA and was one of the founding members of the Eastern Mediterranean University, the very first university of the Turkish Cypriot community. Following the Turkish invasion of Cyprus in 1974, he helped establish a new secondary school in Lapithos and served as its first head-teacher. Throughout his career, Erduran made numerous visits to schools in the United Kingdom, USA and Turkey.

Erduran was an effective teacher who made a significant impact not only on the practice and policy of education but also on the intellectual discourse on education in Cyprus. He was a proponent of interdisciplinary and holistic teaching. In 1954, he said:

"Teachers, above all, are responsible for raising the cultural capital of the societies that they live in. In order to nurture literate and constructive generations, teachers need awareness of not only their subject knowledge but also other subjects to broaden their vision. Academic knowledge is necessary but not sufficient as a strong cultural foundation of youngsters".

Francis Bacon’s essay “Of Studies” best captured Erduran's passion for pedagogy and English literature: “Studies serve for delight, for ornament, and for ability” influenced his teaching philosophy in differentiating the purposes of education. He believed in everyone's potential to learn, and took it upon himself as a teacher and an administrator to find creative ways of facilitating learning. He had a rare talent for transforming complex ideas into simple, striking and animated narrative.

== Literature and journalism ==
Erduran was also a known figure in Turkish Cypriot literature and journalism. He contributed regularly to the Ideas and Arts Magazine “Çardak” where he published short stories. His prose was existential in nature, and was influenced by international literature and philosophy including the work of Bertrand Russell, Albert Camus and Knut Hamsun. He published numerous articles in the Turkish Cypriot newspaper "Nacak." His prose had an existential tone, questioning the absurdity of life and the alienation of humanity, often drawing on metaphors from the natural world to symbolise aspects of the human condition. In an interview he reported:

"I must have believed that everything in life, apart from the earth, is rotten, and everything is lacking of something. It must be so because the smell of soil has never been missing in my stories".

The existential undertone of his writing was uniquely positioned in reference to education where he saw it as the responsibility of teachers and society at large to help the public understand and come to terms with humanity's place in the world. Education in this sense was a vehicle to promote clarity of reason in understanding the existential condition of humanity. In his article “To Make Live,” he took issue with ignorance particularly in reference to the role of reading in the Turkish Cypriot community describing it as a “deep wound of its cultural life” Nevertheless, he was hopeful that the contributions made within the community would yield to the advancement of the indigenous literature to the point of serious competition with the mainland Turkish literature. His stories were full of lyrical use of the Turkish language through simple yet deep and powerful metaphors. His inspiration for writing came to fruition when he would "lock (his) observations in (his) mind and wait for (his) characters to riot against them. Then and only then (he) would feel the necessity to weave the plot onto paper".

== Later life ==
One of Erduran's passions in life was swimming. During British colonial rule, he competed in the swimming championships involving Greek and Turkish Cypriots as well as the British expatriates, having won numerous competitions. Ayten Erduran, his wife of 50 years died in London in 2003. He is survived by his daughter Sibel Erduran, Professor of STEM Education at University of Limerick, Ireland; son Nihat Erol Erduran, Mental Health Manager at the National Health Service, London. His obituary has appeared in the Times Higher Education Magazine (25 August 2011), The Times (17 August 2011) and Cyprus Mail (14 August 2011).
