= Filiz Besim =

Turkish Cypriot politician

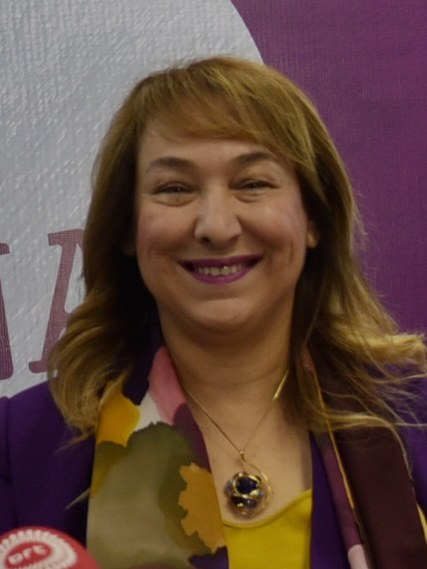

Minister of Health of Northern Cyprus
- Incumbent
- Assumed office 2 February 2018
- Preceded by: Faiz Sucuoğlu

Personal details
- Born: Agios Ioannis, Paphos
- Party: Republican Turkish Party

Filiz Besim is a Turkish Cypriot politician, dentist and writer. She became a member of the Council of Ministers as the Minister of Health for Northern Cyprus in 2018.

== Education ==
Besim completed her secondary studies at the Türk Maarif Koleji. She later graduated from the Ankara University's Faculty of Dentistry in 1987. She received her PhD from the same university in 2000.

== Political career ==
Besim was asked to be the Minister of Health in 2015 by the leader of Republican Turkish Party at the time and former President Mehmet Ali Talat. However she refused the offer citing internal problems within the party.

She became a candidate of Republican Turkish Party for the 2018 parliamentary election after receiving an invitation from Tufan Erhürman, the leader of the party. She failed to obtain a seat as a Member of Parliament for Morphou. She was appointed to be the Minister of Health and received her new post on 2 February 2018.
