= Raşit Pertev =

Cypriot politician (born 1958)

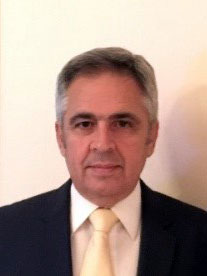

Secretary of the International Fund for Agricultural Development

Raşit Pertev (born September 1958) is a development practitioner, politician and writer. He was appointed as the Secretary of the International Fund for Agricultural Development in October 2013.

Born in Larnaca, Cyprus, Pertev is a graduate of Economics from the University of Cambridge and of Development Economics from the University of London. As Assistant Secretary General of the World Federation of Farmers, he led the international recognition and mainstreaming of farmers' organizations in development policies and institutions, from 1994 to 2000. He served in the World Bank as International Cooperative Specialist and as Senior Agriculture Economist, from 2000-2004 and 2010–2013, in financial restructuring and agricultural reform operations in Turkey, Croatia, Uganda and Burundi.

Between 2004 and 2005, Pertev served as Minister Agriculture and Forestry in North Cyprus, where he led reforms especially in dairy and olive sectors. In April 2005 he was appointed Chief Negotiator for the United Nations Peace Talks and Undersecretary for the Office of the President under the Turkish Cypriot leader Mehmet Ali Talat, and served as plenipotentiary to Mr. Talat until December 2007. As a writer, he has authored several published books on problems of war and displacement, including an award-winning documentary on missing persons.
