= Dr. Burhan Nalbantoğlu State Hospital =

Coordinates: 35.2068689°N 33.33115346°E

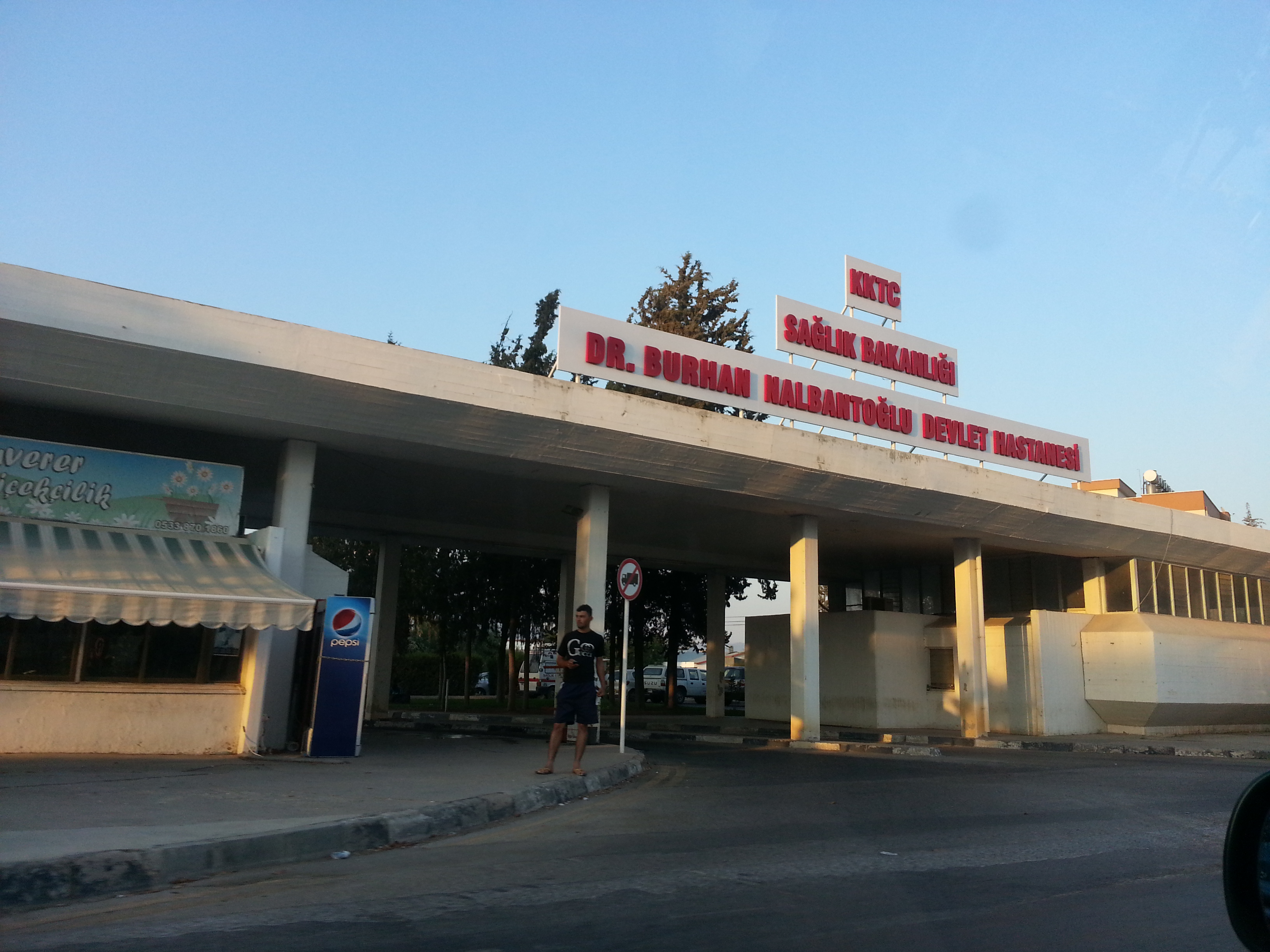

Geography
- Location: Gönyeli, Nicosia, Northern Cyprus

Organisation
- Type: General

History
- Opened: 1978

Dr. Burhan Nalbantoğlu State Hospital in Nicosia, Northern Cyprus built in 1978, is a hospital operated by Ministry of Health of Northern Cyprus. Prior to 1981 it was known as the Nicosia State Hospital.

== History ==
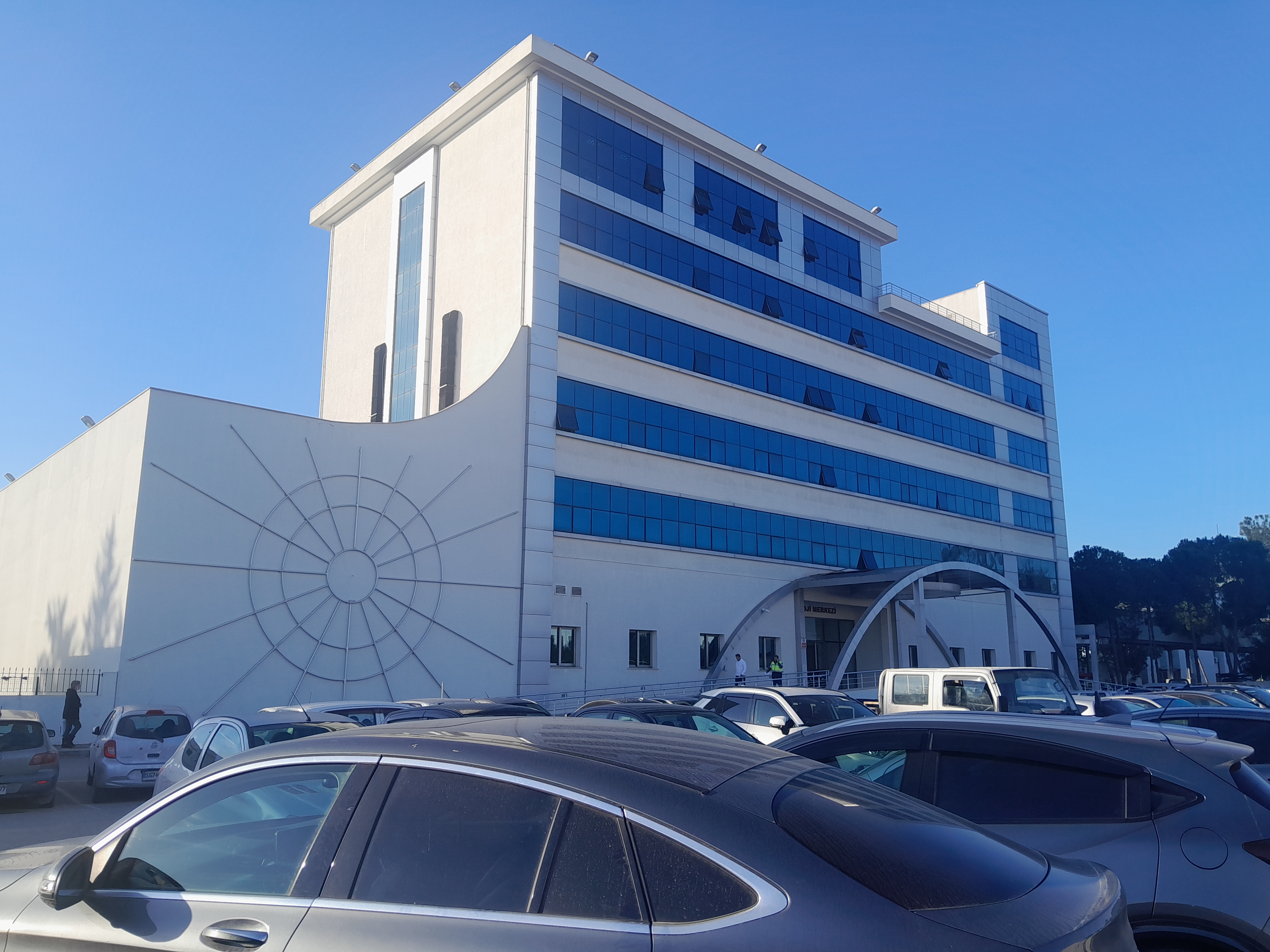
Oncology building

After the events of 1963, a decision was made to increase the number of health centers and hospitals in areas with a high Turkish Cypriot population. In Nicosia, it was decided to construct a new State Hospital with financial and technical assistance from Turkey. The foundation of the hospital was laid in 1971 on a 41,650m² area located between Ortaköy and Gönyeli, 5 km from Gönyeli. The hospital, consisting of 6 blocks and covering an area of 22,556m², was completed and inaugurated with a ceremony on February 13, 1978. On October 19, 1981, with the enactment of the law for naming state hospitals, the Nicosia State Hospital was renamed Dr. Burhan Nalbantoğlu State Hospital.

Over time, due to increasing needs, the hospital became insufficient, and in November 1988, the Cancer Center building was constructed. Later, the Hemodialysis unit was added to this building in 1996, followed by the Chest Diseases and Infectious Diseases units in 1998. A CT scanner was purchased for the section housing the Radiation Oncology unit. Additionally, a Nuclear Medicine unit was established in this section in 1996. In 1988, a Thalassemia Center was founded in this hospital, and in 1996, the Blood Bank was relocated to this section. The upper part of the building began to be used as a nurses' dormitory, and with this relocation, the 4th floor of the Second Block was reorganized to accommodate the Neurology, Neurosurgery, and Physical Therapy units. In 2002, part of the nurses' dormitory above the Thalassemia Center was vacated, and with the contributions of the Cancer Patients Assistance Association, an Oncology Unit was opened in this section. In 2001, a Diabetes Center was built, where all procedures for diabetic patients started to be carried out.

In June 2004, a Polyclinic building was constructed next to the Special Education Center, and all outpatient clinics and laboratories from the main building were moved to this section. Additionally, a new Radiology Center and an Early Diagnosis Center were established in this building.

In June 2015, a new oncology center was added to the hospital. The newly constructed center has a total capacity of 78 beds. The Oncology Center also provides chemotherapy and radiotherapy services within the hospital. This center serves as a fully equipped oncology hospital.
