= Kizilbash (suburb) =

Kizilbash: Τράχωνας (Greek); Kızılay (Turkish)
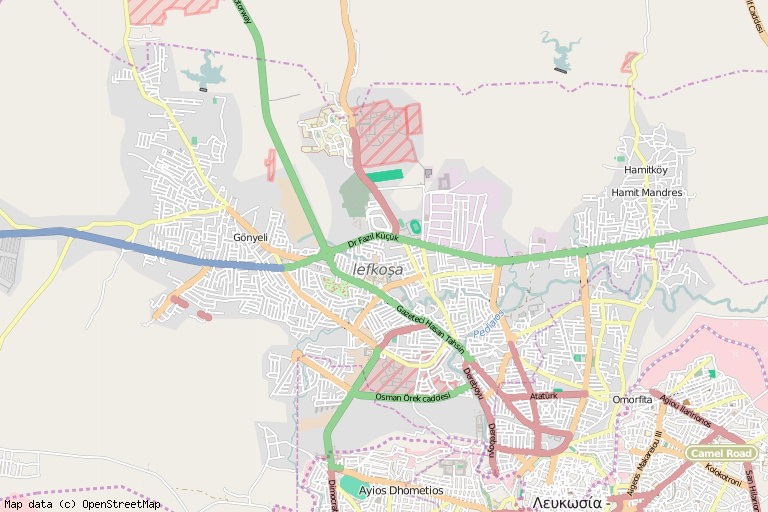
- Location in North Nicosia
- Coordinates: 35°11′41.97″N 33°21′19.41″E
- Country (de jure): Cyprus
  - District: Nicosia District
- Country (de facto): Northern Cyprus
  - District: Lefkoşa District

Population (2011)
  - Total: 3,535
- Time zone: UTC+2 (EET)
  - Summer (DST): UTC+3 (EEST)

Kizilbash or Trachonas (Turkish: Kızılay or Kızılbaş; Greek: Τράχωνας) is a northern suburb of Nicosia, Cyprus. De facto, it is under the control of Northern Cyprus.
