= Mustafa Djamgoz =

- Mustafa Bilgin Ali Camgöz
- Born: 1952 (age 73–74); Nicosia, Cyprus
- Education: Imperial College London
- Awards: Huxley Memorial Medal
- Scientific career
- Fields: Biology

Prof. Mustafa Bilgin Ali Djamgoz (Turkish: Mustafa Bilgin Ali Camgöz) (born in 1952, Nicosia, Cyprus) is Professor of cancer biology at Imperial College London and chairman of the College of Medicine’s Science Council.

== Biography ==
Djamgoz was born in Nicosia, Cyprus, to a Turkish Cypriot family. He emigrated to the United Kingdom in 1970 for his studies. Djamgoz studied at the Imperial College London, where he became a Professor of Neurobiology, and then Professor of Cancer Biology. His scientific consultancies and granting agencies include the Medical Research Council (UK) and the Wellcome Trust. In 2002, Djamgoz established the Pro Cancer Research Fund as a registered charity which runs the Amber Care Centre, which is a drop-in centre for people affected by cancer.

== Awards and honours ==
- The Huxley Memorial Medal
- The Japanese Government Research Award for Foreign Specialist
- The Freedom of the City of London

== Publications ==
Djamgoz has published four books and over 200 primary research papers.
