= Kutlay Erk =

Cypriot politician

Kutlay Erk (born 1952) is a Cypriot politician. He served as mayor of North Nicosia, the Turkish Cypriot part of Nicosia, the capital of Cyprus, from 2002 to 2006. Erk was elected to the post in June 2002 for a four-year term, leaving office in June 2006.

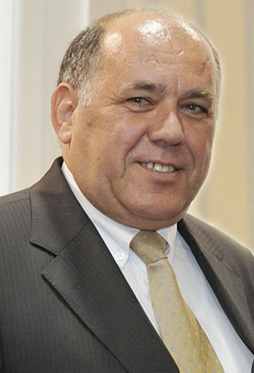
Kutlay-Erk

Political offices
Preceded by Şemi Bora	Mayor of Turkish Nicosia; 2002-2006	Succeeded by Cemal Metin Bulutoğluları
