= Ayşegül Baybars =

Northern Cyprus politician

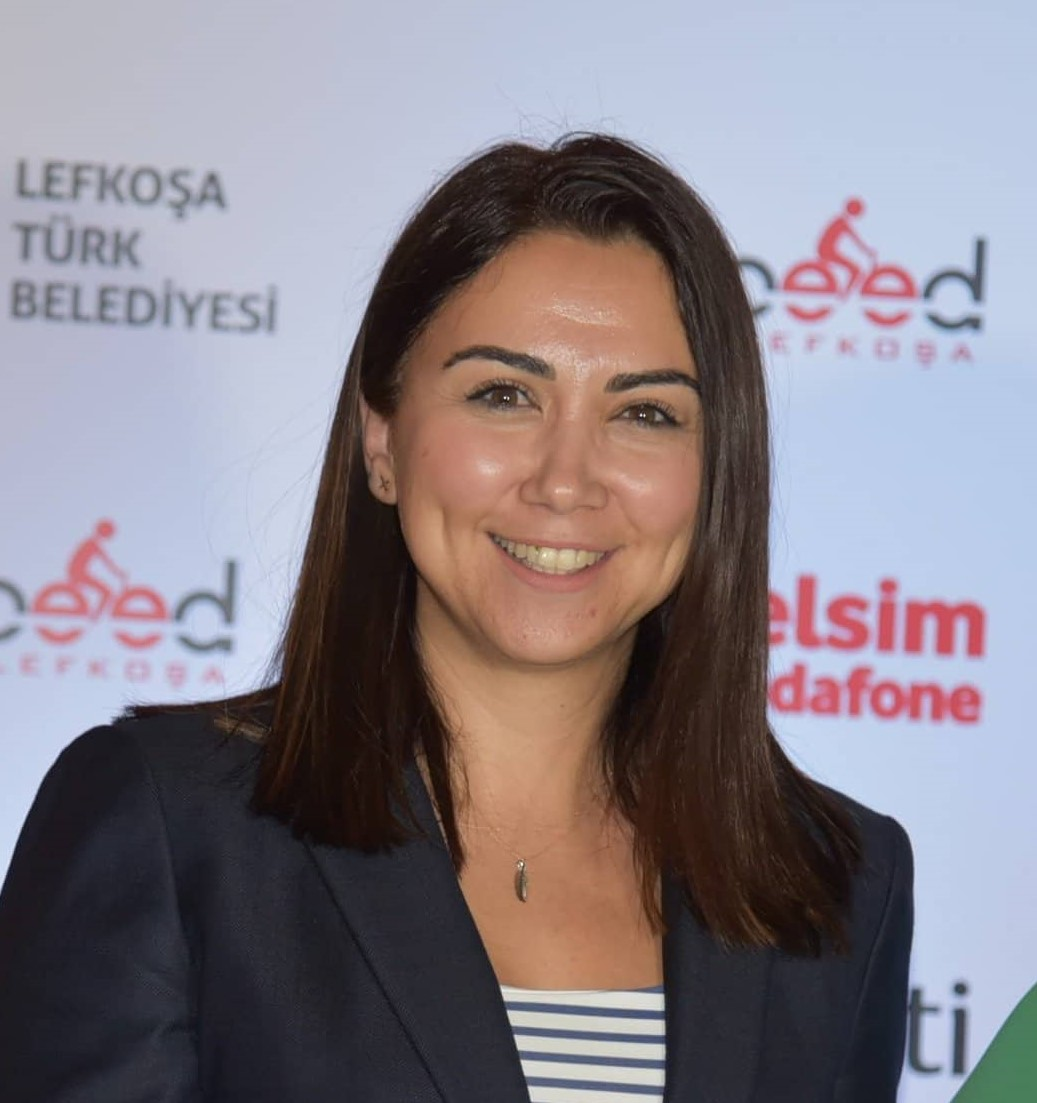
- Ayşegül Baybars (2018)

Interior Minister of TRNC
- In office 2 February 2018 – 10 December 2020
- Appointed by: Mustafa Akıncı
- Parliamentary group: People's Party (former member)

Personal details
- Born: 16 November 1981 (age 44) Gazimağusa
- Education: Marmara University
- Occupation: Politician, lawyer

Ayşegül Baybars Kadri (born 1981) is a Turkish-Cypriot politician, who served as Interior Minister for Northern Cyprus between 2018 and 2020.

== Career ==
In 2002 Baybars graduated with a degree in law from Marmara University. She subsequently studied for a MA in European Law at the same institution. The lawyer was a founding member in 2016 of the Halkın Partisi (People's Party) established. Baybars was appointed Interior Minister on 2 February 2018. She has been the youngest member of the Northern Cyprus coalition government. She resigned from the People's Party in 2022, alongside Jale Refik Rogers and 64 other party members.

== Personal life ==
Baybars is married and has one child.
