= Mehmet Harmancı =

Turkish Cypriot politician

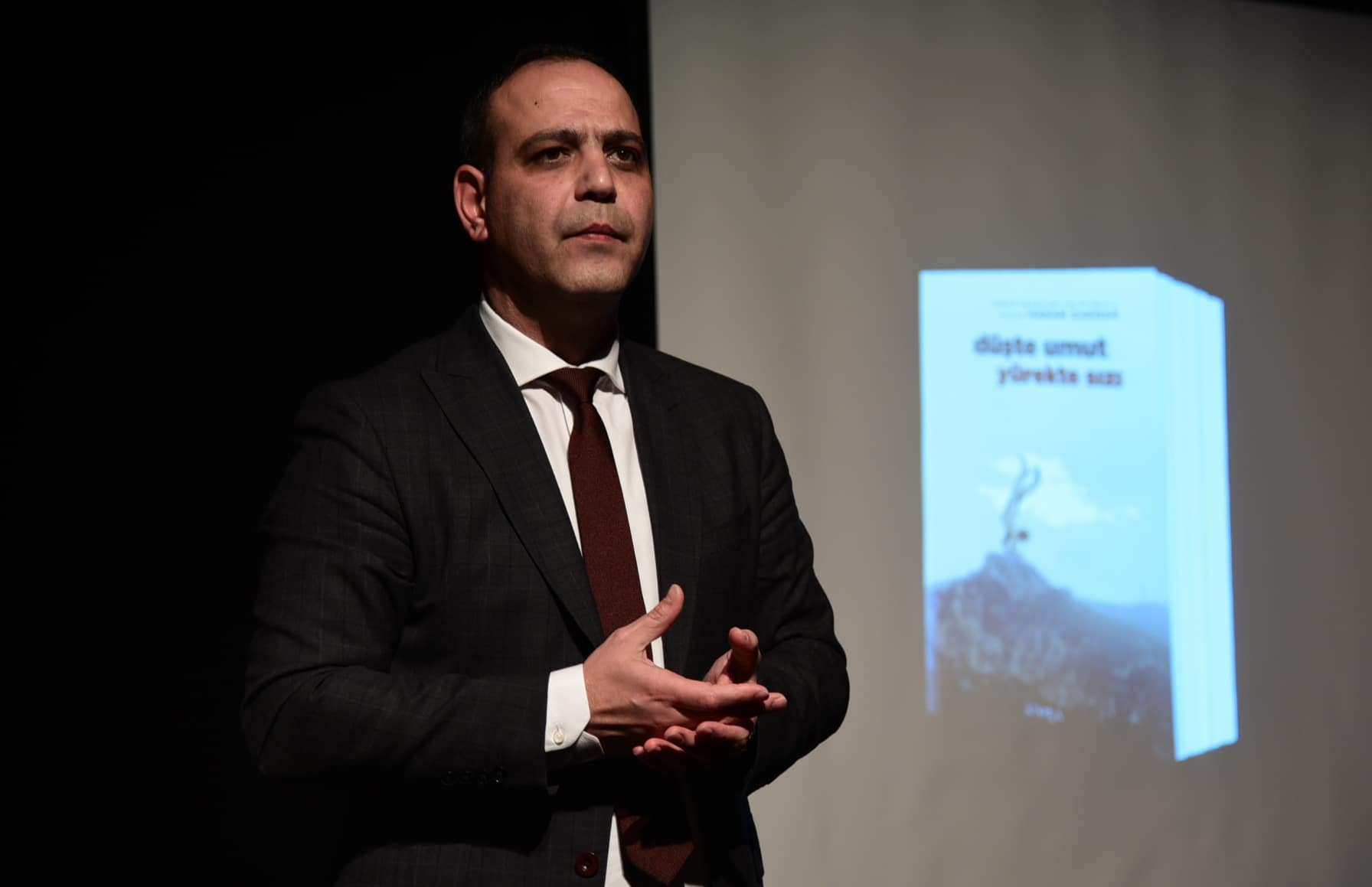
Mehmet Harmancı

Mehmet Harmancı (born 1977) is the current mayor of the Nicosia Turkish Municipality, the local government of the Turkish Cypriot capital North Nicosia. He was born in Nicosia.

He studied international relations in the Eastern Mediterranean University and completed his master's degree on the EU in John Moores University in Liverpool. He began his political life in the youth wing of the Communal Liberation Party and after its merger with the BDH, continued in the Communal Democracy Party. He worked as a director in a tourism agency between 2005 and 2008. From June till September 2013, he served as the Minister of Tourism, Environment and Culture in a transition cabinet headed by Sibel Siber. In the local elections of 2014, he got 38.6% of the votes and was elected the mayor of North Nicosia.

Political offices
Preceded by Kadri Fellahoğlu	Mayor of North Nicosia; 2014–	Succeeded by incumbent
