= Jale Refik Rogers =

Northern Cyprus politician

Personal details
- Born: 4 February 1977 (age 49) North Nicosia, Northern Cyprus
- Party: People's Party
- Education: University of Maine (BSc); Cornell University (PhD)

Jale Refik Rogers (born 1977) is a Turkish Cypriot molecular biologist and politician. She was elected as a member of the Assembly of the Republic of Northern Cyprus in 2018.

== Early years and education ==
Jale Refik Rogers was born in North Nicosia in 1977. She completed her secondary education at the Türk Maarif Koleji. She received the Fulbright Scholarship and enrolled to the University of Maine. She graduated magna cum laude with a bachelor of science degree, majoring in biochemistry with a minor in Chemistry in 1998. Before starting to her doctoral studies at the Weill Cornell Graduate School of Medical Sciences of the Cornell University, she worked as a research assistant for the Harvard Medical School. She received a PhD degree from the Cornell University in Molecular Biology in 2006.

== Professional career ==
Rogers was a research fellow at the Hospital for Special Surgery from 2006 to 2007. She returned to Cyprus in 2007, co-founding and becoming a lecturer as an assistant professor for the Faculty of Pharmacy of the Near East University in Nicosia. She became the founder of the Molecular Genetics Laboratory of the Burhan Nalbantoğlu State Hospital in 2010. She still works as the head of the laboratory.

== Political career ==
Jale Refik Rogers was amongst the founding members of the People's Party. She was named to the provisional Central Executive Body of the party and was reelected to her position after the first congress. She took a critical stance, expressing her concerns on the quality of health services provided by the state and suggested important reforms to reevaluate the health system. In the 2018 parliamentary election, she was the candidate of the People's Party for the Girne District, and was 4th on the party list. She was officially elected to be a Member of Parliament with the formal announcement of the results.

She was re-elected in the 2022 election.
