= Attilla (disambiguation) =

Attilla was the ruler of the Huns from 434 until his death, in March 453.

Attilla may also refer to:

- alternate spelling for Atila (disambiguation)
- alternate spelling for Attila (disambiguation)
- alternate spelling for Atilla (disambiguation)
- alternate spelling for Attila the Hun (disambiguation)
