= Attila (name) =

- Pronunciation: Hungarian: [ˈɒtillɒ]
- Gender: Male

Other names
- Alternative spelling: Atilla

Attila is a popular masculine name in Central and Eastern Europe, Southeastern Europe and Western Asia. Primarily in Hungary, Turkey and Chuvashia. Attila is the most used version in Hungary, however another version of Attila is Atilla and Etele, the female equivalent of which is Etelka. Attila may be also used as Atilla in Turkish.

== Etymology ==
It has been traditionally claimed that the name Attila is formed from Gothic atta meaning "father", through the diminutive suffix -ila, the "little father". Related names are not uncommon among Germanic peoples of the period, i. e. Ætla, Bishop of Dorchester. The Gothic etymology was proposed by Jacob Grimm and Wilhelm Grimm in the early 19th century. Tom Shippey argued that the Gothic etymology is a product of 19th century Germanic romantic philological revisionism.

Otto Maenchen-Helfen, who considered Gothic etymology, noted that Hunnic names were "not the true names of the Hun princes and lords. What we have are Hunnic names in Germanic dress, modified to fit the Gothic tongue, or popular Gothic etymologies, or both".

Hyun Jin Kim noted Attila has more natural and probable Turkic etymology. Omeljan Pritsak considered ̕Άττίλα (Attila) a composite title-name which derived from Turkic *es (great, old), and *t il (sea, ocean), and the suffix /a/. The stressed back syllabic til assimilated the front member es, so it became *as. It is a nominative, in form of attíl- (< *etsíl < *es tíl) with the meaning "the oceanic, universal ruler". Peter Golden, citing Pritsak, like László Rásonyi connected Attila's name with a note by Menander in which the term Attilan was used as the name of the Volga River (Turkic Atil/Itil; "great river"). J.J. Mikkola connected it with Turkic āt (name, fame). Gerd Althoff considered it was related to Turkish atli (horseman, cavalier), or Turkish at (horse) and dil (tongue).

In 2025, Svenja Bonmann and Simon Fries, as part of their hypothesis that the Huns spoke a Yeniseian language, proposed that the name Attila could come from an Old Arin adjective *atɨ-la, meaning "quick".

== Popularity in Hungary during the 20th century ==
It was not until the second half of the 20th century that the name Attila gained widespread popularity; earlier in the century, it remained largely unheard of in rural communities. Illustrating this, the foster parents of renowned poet Attila József in the village of Öcsöd rejected his given name as non-existent, opting to call him Pista (Steve) instead—an incident he documented in his autobiography, Curriculum Vitae (1936):

After consulting with the neighbors, my foster parents declared in my presence that the name Attila did not exist. This astounded me deeply; I felt as though my very existence had been called into question. I believe the discovery of the tales about King Attila had a decisive influence on all my endeavors from then on. In the end, perhaps it was this very experience that led me to literature; it was this experience that made me a thinker—someone who listens to the opinions of others, but examines them critically within himself; someone who answers to the name Pista until what he himself believes is proven true: that his name is Attila.

— Attila József (1936), Curriculum Vitae

== Given name ==
- Attila (died 453), ruler of the Huns
- Saint Attila (937–1007), Aragonese bishop
- Atilla Altıkat (died 1982), Turkish diplomat
- Attila Ábrahám (born 1967), Hungarian sprint canoeist
- Attila Ambrus (born 1967), Hungarian bank robber
- Attila Aşkar (born 1943), Turkish mathematician and president of Koç University
- Attila Balázs (born 1989), Hungarian tennis player
- Attila Barcza (born 1985). Hungarian politician
- Attila Böjte (born 1976), Hungarian footballer
- Attila Burzi (born 1975), Hungarian footballer
- Áttila de Carvalho (born 1910, date of death unknown), known as Áttila, Brazilian international footballer
- Attila Csihar (born 1971), Hungarian musician
- Attila Csipler (1939–1996), Romanian fencer
- Attila Cseke (born 1973), Hungarian politician in Romania
- Attila Czene (born 1974), Hungarian swimmer
- Attila Dargay (1927–2009), Hungarian animator
- Attila Demény, (1955–2021), Romanian ethnic Hungarian composer and theatre director
- Attila Dobos (born 1978), Hungarian footballer
- Attila Elek (born 1982), Hungarian ice dancer
- Atilla Engin (1946–2019), Turkish American musician
- Attila Fekete (disambiguation)
- Attila Filkor (born 1988), Hungarian footballer
- Attila Gróf (born 1964), Hungarian footballer
- Attila Györe (born 1975), Hungarian marathon canoeist
- Attila Hejazi (born 1976), Iranian retired football player and coach.
- Attila Horváth (disambiguation)
- Attilâ İlhan (1925–2005), Turkish writer and poet
- Attila József (1905–1937), Hungarian poet
- Attila Kerekes (born 1954), Hungarian international footballer
- Attila Kornis (born 1989), Hungarian footballer
- Attila Kovács (disambiguation)
- Attila Ladinszky (1949–2020), nicknamed Le Gitan, Hungarian footballer
- Attila Losonczy (born 1974), Hungarian neuroscientist and Columbia University professor
- Attila Menyhárt (born 1984), Hungarian footballer
- Attila Mesterházy (born 1974), Hungarian politician
- Attila Nagy (actor) (1933–1992), Hungarian actor
- Attila Özdemiroğlu (1943–2016), Turkish composer and arranger
- Attila Péterffy (born 1969), Hungarian politician
- Atila Pesyani (born 1957), Iranian actor.
- Attila Petschauer (1904–1943), Hungarian 2x team Olympic champion saber fencer killed in the Holocaust
- Attila Pintér (disambiguation)
- Attila Polonkai (born 1979), Hungarian footballer
- Attila Sallustro, Italian-Paraguayan footballer
- Attila Sávolt (born 1976), Hungarian tennis player
- Attila Sekerlioglu (born 1965), Turkish footballer
- Attila Simon (disambiguation)
- Attila Szabó (disambiguation)
- Attila Szalai (born 1998), Hungarian footballer
- Attila Szalay-Berzeviczy (born 1972), Hungarian economist
- Attila Tököli (born 1976), Hungarian footballer
- Attila Varga (born 1969), Hungarian footballer
- Attila Zoller (1927–1998), Hungarian-born jazz musician
- Attila the Hun (calypsonian) (1892–1962), Trinidadian singer
- Attila the Stockbroker (born 1957), British punk poet

== Other ==
- Attila (horse) (1839–1846), British thoroughbred racehorse and sire
- Louis Attila (1844–1924), name used by German-born American strongman Ludwig Durlacher

== See also ==
- Attila (disambiguation)
