= Atilla (disambiguation) =

Atilla is a variant spelling of Attila, ruler of the Huns from 434 to 453.

Atilla may also refer to:

- Atilla (clothing), a Hungarian shell-jacket or short coat
- Operation Atilla, a Turkish Armed Forces invasion in response to the 1974 Cypriot coup d'état

== People with the surname ==
- Can Atilla (born 1969), Turkish composer and musician

== People with the given name ==
- Atilla Altıkat (died 1982), Turkish military attaché to Ottawa, Canada
- Atilla Birlik (born 1977), Turkish German footballer
- Atilla Engin (1946–2019), Turkish American fusion jazz musician
- Atilla Iskifoglu, Turkish world champion flair bartender
- Atilla Karaosmanoğlu (1932–2013), Turkish economist and politician
- Atilla Koç (born 1946), Turkish politician of the Justice and Development Party
- Atilla Koca (born 1980), Turkish professional footballer
- Atilla Kuzu (born 1963), Turkish designer
- Atilla Manizade (born in Cyprus, 1945–2016), Turkish Cypriot opera singer
- Atilla Özmen (born 1988), Turkish footballer
- Atilla Taş (born 1975), Turkish singer
- Atilla Yayla (born 1957), Turkish political thinker
- Atilla Yildirim (born 1990), Dutch professional footballer
- Atilla Şereftuğ (born 1950), Turkish Swiss songwriter

== See also ==
- Atila (disambiguation)
- Attila (disambiguation)
- Attila (name)
