= Attila (disambiguation) =

Attila (406–453) was a king of the Huns in the 5th century.

Attila may also refer to:

- Attila (name)

== Film and television ==
- Attila (1954 film), an Italian-French co-production
- Attila (miniseries), a 2001 American miniseries starring Gerard Butler
- Attila (Severance), a 2025 episode of Severance

== Literature ==
- Attila (novel), a 1975 novel by Klas Östergren
- Attila, an 1837 novel by G. P. R. James

== Music ==
- Attila (rock band), a late-1960s American duo that included Billy Joel
- Attila (album), a 1979 studio recording by Mina
- Attila (heavy metal band), a group from New York City active 1983–1986
- "Attila", a song from the 2004 Iced Earth album The Glorious Burden
- Attila (metalcore band), a group from Atlanta, Georgia, active since 2005

== Stage ==
- Attila (play), a 1667 production by Pierre Corneille
- Attila (opera), an 1846 work by Giuseppe Verdi

== Other uses ==
- Attila (automobile), a brand of automobiles
- Attila (bird), a genus of tropical birds
- Attila (horse), a British Thoroughbred racehorse
- Attila, Illinois
- 1489 Attila, an asteroid
- Total War: Attila, a 2015 video game
- Mount Conner or Attila, a mountain in central Australia

== See also ==
- Atila (disambiguation)
- Atilla (disambiguation)
- Attila Marcel, a 2013 French comedy film by Sylvain Chomet
- Attila the Hun (disambiguation)
- Attila the Stockbroker (born 1957), British punk poet
- Operation Attila, in World War 2
- Turkish invasion of Cyprus of 1974, code-named by Turkey as Operation Atilla
