= Etelka =

Etelka or Etelke is a Hungarian given name. It is the female equivalent of Etele, a variant of Attila. It may have originated as the name of the title character in the 1788 novel Etelka by Dugonics András.

It is sometimes translated into English as Adelaide.

== People with the name ==
- Etelka Barsi-Pataky (1941–2018), Hungarian politician
- Etelka Freund (1879–1977), Hungarian pianist
- Etelka Gerster (1855–1920), Hungarian soprano
- Etelka Kenéz Heka (1936–2024), Hungarian writer and singer
- Etelka Keserű (1925–2018), Hungarian economist and politician
- Etelka Kispál (born 1941), Hungarian Olympic sprinter
- Etelka A. Leadlay (born 1947), British botanist
- Etelka Szapáry (1798–1876), Hungarian noble

== See also ==
- Burara etelka, a butterfly of family Hesperiidae
- Coleophora etelka, a moth of family Coleophoridae
