= Atila =

Atila, as a given name, is an alternative spelling of Attila, the fifth century ruler of the Huns. It may also refer to:

== People ==
- Spelling of Attila (name) in Turkish, Spanish, Serbian (Serbian Cyrillic : Атила) and Átila in Portuguese
  - Atila Turan (born 1992), Turkish footballer who currently plays for French Ligue 1 club Stade de Reims
  - Átila Abreu (born 1987), Brazilian racing driver
  - Atila Huseyin, British jazz singer of Turkish Cypriot origin
  - Atila Kasaš (born 1968), Serbian footballer of Hungarian origin

== Other uses ==
- Atila, an 1876 Spanish play by Enrique Gaspar
- Atila (band), Spanish band
- Atila, a nickname for the Argentine detention center Mansión Seré

== See also ==
- Attila (406–453), ruler of the Huns
- ATILA, Finite element analysis software
- Atilla (disambiguation)
