= Kuzu (surname) =

Kuzu (IPA: [kuˈzu], literally "lamb") is a Turkish surname from a nickname and may refer to:

- Abdurrahim Kuzu (born 1955), Turkish and American wrestler
- Atilla Kuzu (born 1963), Turkish interior designer and furniture designer
- Burhan Kuzu (1955–2020), Turkish academic and politician
- Tunahan Kuzu (born 1981), Turkish-born Dutch politician

== See also ==
- Kuzu (disambiguation)
