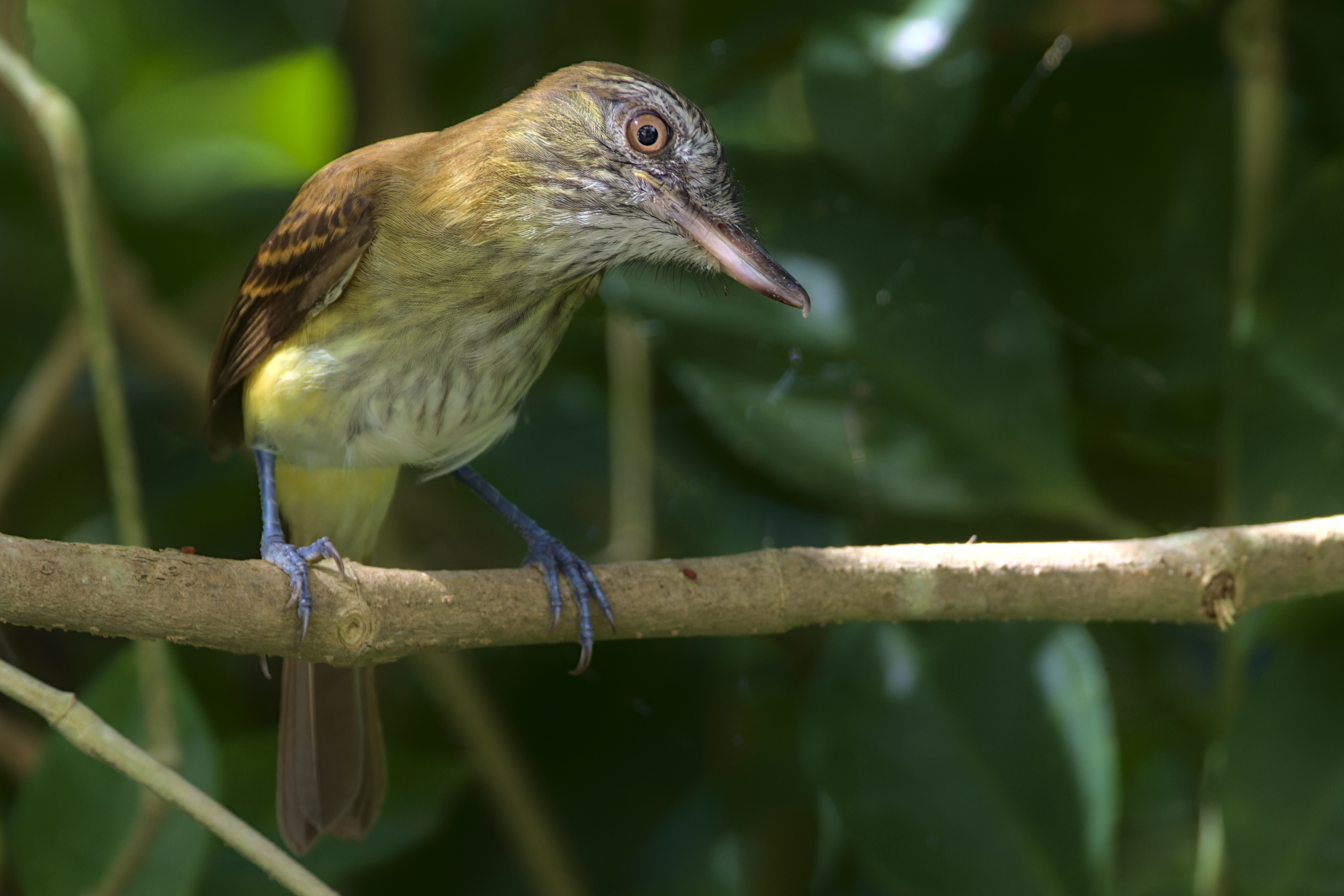

Conservation status
- Least Concern (IUCN 3.1)

Scientific classification
- Kingdom: Animalia
- Phylum: Chordata
- Class: Aves
- Order: Passeriformes
- Family: Tyrannidae
- Genus: Attila
- Species: A. spadiceus

Binomial name
- Attila spadiceus (Gmelin, JF, 1789)

= Bright-rumped attila =

Species of bird

The bright-rumped attila or polymorphic attila (Attila spadiceus) is a small passerine bird in the tyrant flycatcher family (Tyrannidae). It breeds from northwestern Mexico to western Ecuador, Bolivia and southeastern Brazil, and on Trinidad.

== Taxonomy ==
The bright-rumped attila was formally described in 1789 by the German naturalist Johann Friedrich Gmelin in his revised and expanded edition of Carl Linnaeus's Systema Naturae. He placed it with the flycatcher in the genus Muscicapa and coined the binomial name Muscicapa spadicea. The specific epithet is from Latin spadiceus meaning "chestnut coloured" or "date-coloured". Gmelin based his description on the "yellow-rumped flycatcher" from Cayenne that had been described in 1783 by the English ornithologist John Latham in his book A General Synopsis of Birds. The bright-rumped attila is now one of seven flycatchers placed in the genus Attila that was introduced in 1831 by the French naturalist René Lesson.

Twelve subspecies are recognised:

- A. s. pacificus Hellmayr, 1929 – northwest Mexico
- A. s. cozumelae Ridgway, 1885 – Cozumel (Mexico)
- A. s. gaumeri Salvin & Godman, 1891 – Yucatán Peninsula and nearby islands
- A. s. flammulatus Lafresnaye, 1848 – southeast Mexico to Belize and central north Honduras
- A. s. salvadorensis Dickey & Van Rossem, 1929 – El Salvador to northwest Nicaragua
- A. s. citreopyga (Bonaparte, 1854) – southeast Honduras and Nicaragua to west Panama
- A. s. sclateri Lawrence, 1862 – east Panama and northwest Colombia
- A. s. caniceps Todd, 1917 – north, central north Colombia
- A. s. parvirostris Allen, JA, 1900 – northeast Colombia and northwest Venezuela
- A. s. parambae Hartert, EJO, 1900 – west Colombia and northwest Ecuador
- A. s. spadiceus (Gmelin, JF, 1789) – east Colombia through Venezuela and the Guianas south to north Bolivia
- A. s. uropygiatus (Wied-Neuwied, M, 1831) – southeast Brazil

== Description ==
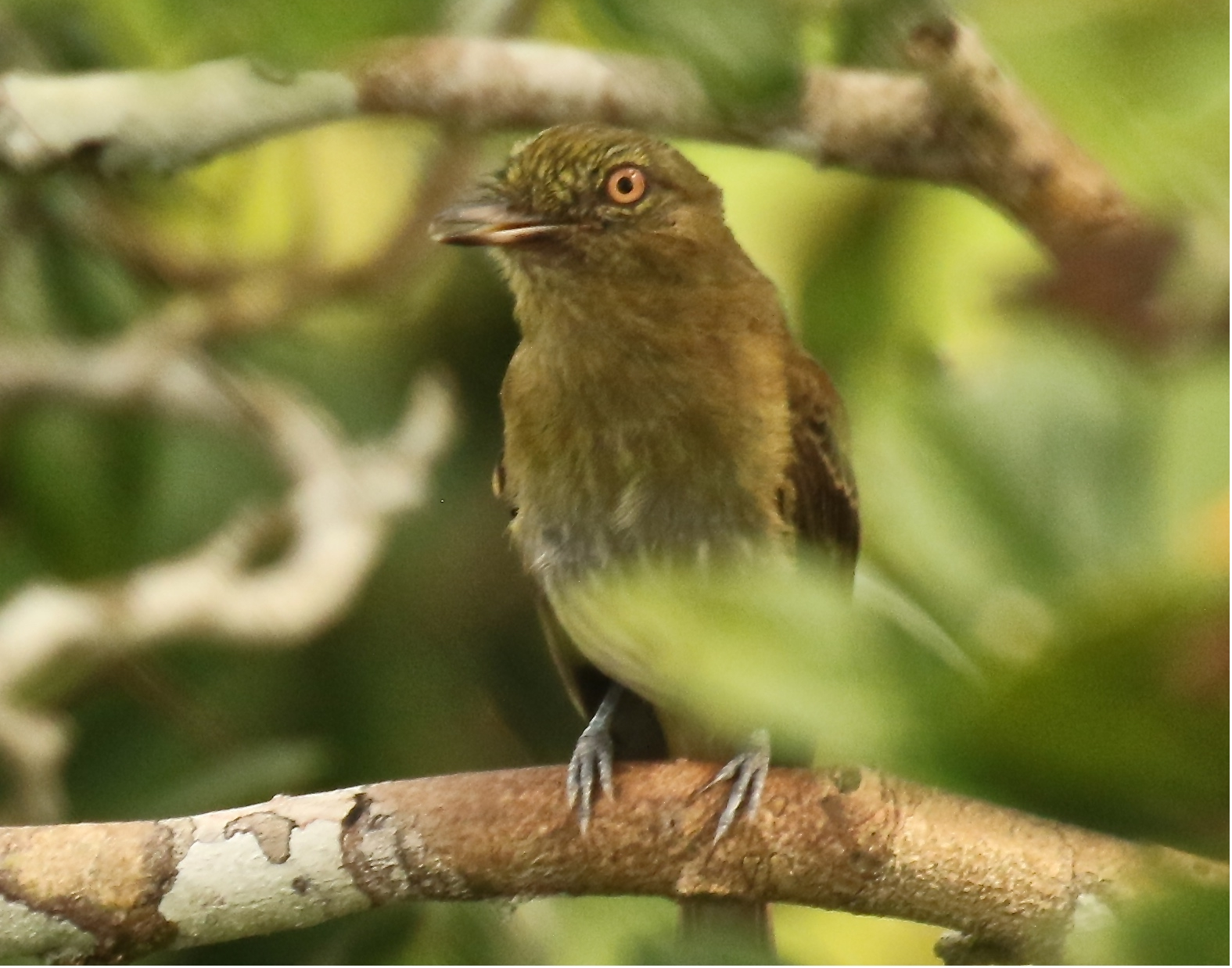
Sacha Lodge - Ecuador

The bright-rumped attila is a large tyrant flycatcher with a big head, hooked and slightly upturned bill and upright stance. It is 7 inches (18 cm) long and weighs 1.4 oz (40 g). The head is olive-green streaked with black, the back is chestnut or olive, the rump bright yellow and the tail brown. The wings are dark brown with two pale wing bars and paler feather edging. The whitish or yellow throat and yellow breast are variably streaked darker. The belly is white becoming yellow near the tail. The iris is red. The sexes are similar, but young birds have a cinnamon-fringed crown and brown eyes.

The plumage is very variable, but the streaking below and obvious wingbars help in distinguishing this species from others in the genus. The calls include a loud beat-it, beat-it and a plaintive ooo weery weery weery weery woo. It does not move when singing, so can be difficult to see.

Central American birds have slightly different song structures and also tend towards lighter ochre plumage independent of Gloger's Rule; they are sometimes separated as flammulated attila (Attila flammulatus) . Their characteristic song given at dawn has been analyzed in detail: it has a very variable number of weerys which may become weery'os, and often ends in a woo-whit; a finite-state machine has been developed to simulate this structure. However, due to the highly variable songs more data is required before the technically plausible split can be accepted; the AOU has so far refrained from formally acknowledging it.

== Distribution and habitat ==
The bright-rumped attila is a common bird from the lowlands to 7,000 ft (2,100 m) ASL. It occurs in forests, second growth, pasture and plantations with trees, and shady gardens, and apparently it can tolerate a considerable amount of habitat destruction.

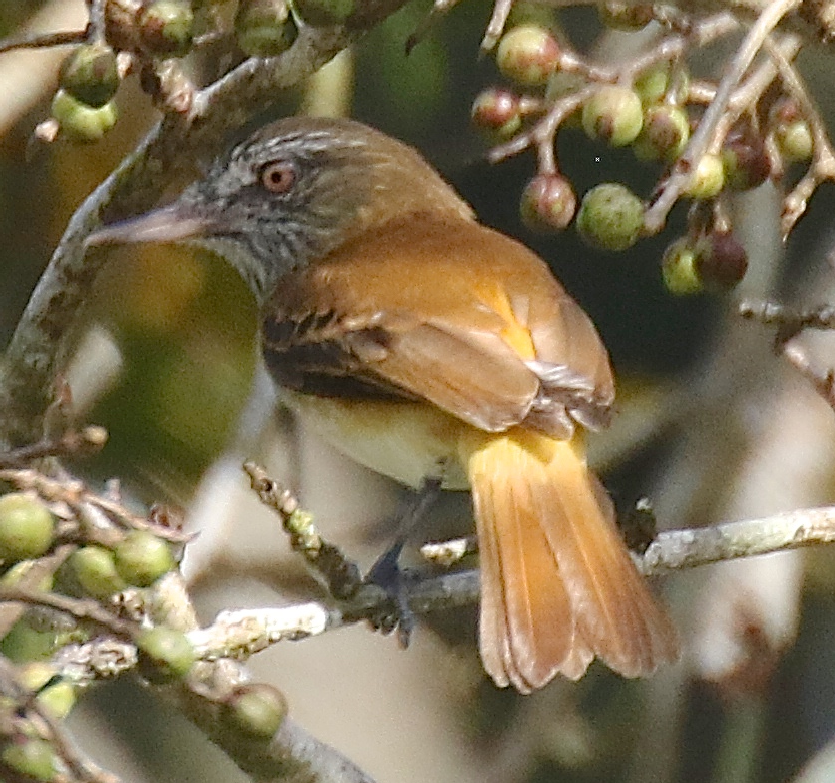
Chan Chich Lodge area -Belize

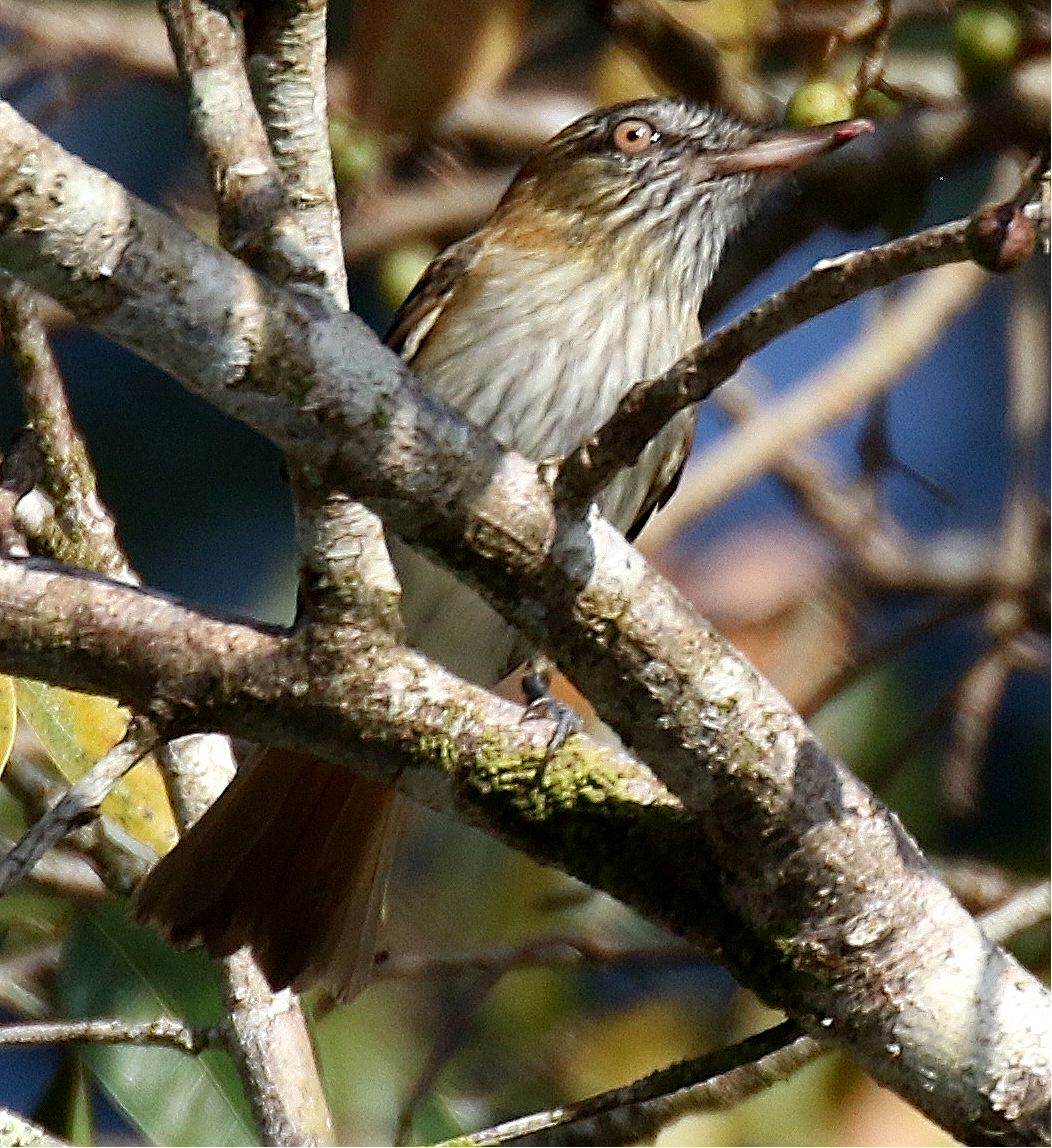
Chan Chich Lodge area - Belize

== Behaviour and ecology ==
=== Feeding ===
It is an active, aggressive and noisy species, usually seen alone. It eats insects, spiders, frogs and lizards taken from vegetation or the ground. It will pursue prey on foot as well as attacking in short sallies, and will follow army ant columns. It also takes many fruits (such as from gumbo-limbo Bursera simaruba, and less frequently from Cymbopetalum mayanum) and seeds.

=== Breeding ===
The nest is a deep cup of mosses, leaves and plant fibre; it may be built usually below 3m high amongst epiphyte, between buttress roots or in a bank, not necessarily in the forest. The typical clutch is 3–4 lilac- or rufous-marked dull white or pink eggs. Incubation by the female is 18–19 days to hatching, with another 18 days to fledging.

== Sources ==
- Hilty, Steven L. (2003): Birds of Venezuela. Christopher Helm, London. ISBN 0-7136-6418-5
