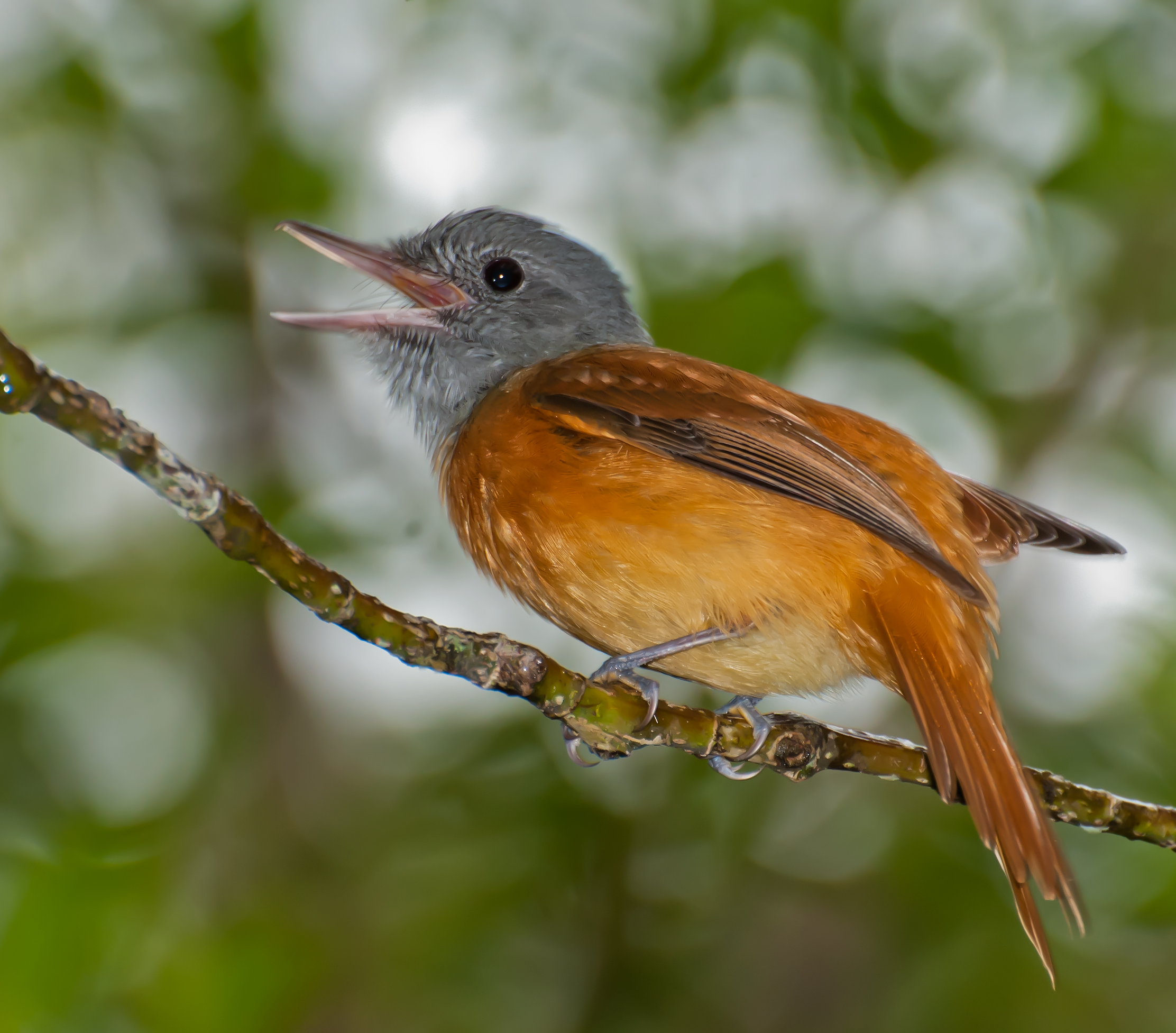

Conservation status
- Least Concern (IUCN 3.1)

Scientific classification
- Kingdom: Animalia
- Phylum: Chordata
- Class: Aves
- Order: Passeriformes
- Family: Tyrannidae
- Genus: Attila
- Species: A. rufus

Binomial name
- Attila rufus (Vieillot, 1819)

Synonyms
- Tyrannus rufus (protonym)

= Grey-hooded attila =

Species of bird

The grey-hooded attila (Attila rufus) is a species of bird in the family Tyrannidae, the tyrant flycatchers. It is endemic to Brazil.

== Taxonomy and systematics ==
The grey-hooded attila was originally described as Tyrannus rufus. From early in the twentieth century until the 1970s many authors classified genus Attila in family Cotingidae; after that it was recognized as belonging to family Tyrannidae.

The grey-hooded attila has two subspecies, the nominate A. r. rufous (Vieillot, 1819) and A. r. hellmayri (Pinto, 1935).

== Description ==
The grey-hooded attila is 20 to 21 cm (7.9 to 8.3 in) long and weighs 36.5 to 51.5 g (1.3 to 1.8 oz). The sexes have the same plumage. Adults of the nominate subspecies have a gray head and nape. Their upperparts are mostly deep rufous with a paler cinnamon-rufous rump and tail. Their wings are mostly deep rufous with blackish primaries. Their chin is gray with white streaks. Their breast is rufous and their belly a paler yellowish rufous. Subspecies A. r. hellmayri has a whitish chin and rufous throat. Adults of both subspecies have a dark iris, a longish bill with a dark maxilla and a whitish to grayish mandible, and gray legs and feet. Juveniles have an all-black bill.

== Distribution and habitat ==
The grey-hooded attila is found in eastern and southeastern Brazil. Subspecies A. r. hellmayri is the more northerly of the two. It is found in central and southern Bahia. The nominate subspecies is found from Minas Gerais and Espírito Santo south to northeastern Rio Grande do Sul. The species inhabits humid forest and scrublands from sea level to 1,500 m (4,900 ft).

== Behavior ==
=== Movement ===
The grey-hooded attila is believed to be a year-round resident.

=== Feeding ===
The grey-hooded attila primarily feeds on large arthropods and also includes fruit in its diet. It typically forages singly or in pairs and sometimes joins mixed-species feeding flocks. It forages at all levels on the forest including on the ground. It perches quietly and takes prey and fruit from foliage and branches while briefly hovering after a short sally.

=== Breeding ===
Grey-hooded attila nests have been found in a tree trunk, in a tree fern, and in a cavity in an earthen bank. Nothing else is known about the species' breeding biology.

=== Vocalization ===
The grey-hooded attila's song is a "slow series of 4-7 emphasized, fluted whee notes, which gradually rise in pitch and strength before the last one, which fades out". It also makes a "softer shorter wee, tee-tee-pu whistle" and an "éé-ew whistle".

== Status ==
The IUCN has assessed the grey-hooded attila as being of Least Concern. Its population size is not known and is believed to be decreasing. No immediate threats have been identified. It is considered uncommon to fairly common and occurs in several protected areas.
