= Kuzu (disambiguation) =

The Kuzu were a people of ancient Japan.

Kuzu may also refer to:

- Kuzu, Tochigi, former town in Japan
- Kuzu Airlines Cargo, a cargo airline based in Istanbul, Turkey
- Kudzu (Pueraria lobata), a climbing vine
- Kuzu (surname), Turkish-language surname
- Kuzu, a 2014 Turkish film
- KUZU-LP, a low-power radio station (92.9 FM) licensed to serve Denton, Texas, United States
- Kuzu tandır, a slow-cooked lamb dish in Turkish cuisine

== See also ==
- "Kuzu Kuzu"
- Kazoo
- Kudzu, a climbing, coiling vine also known as Chinese arrowroot and Japanese arrowroot
