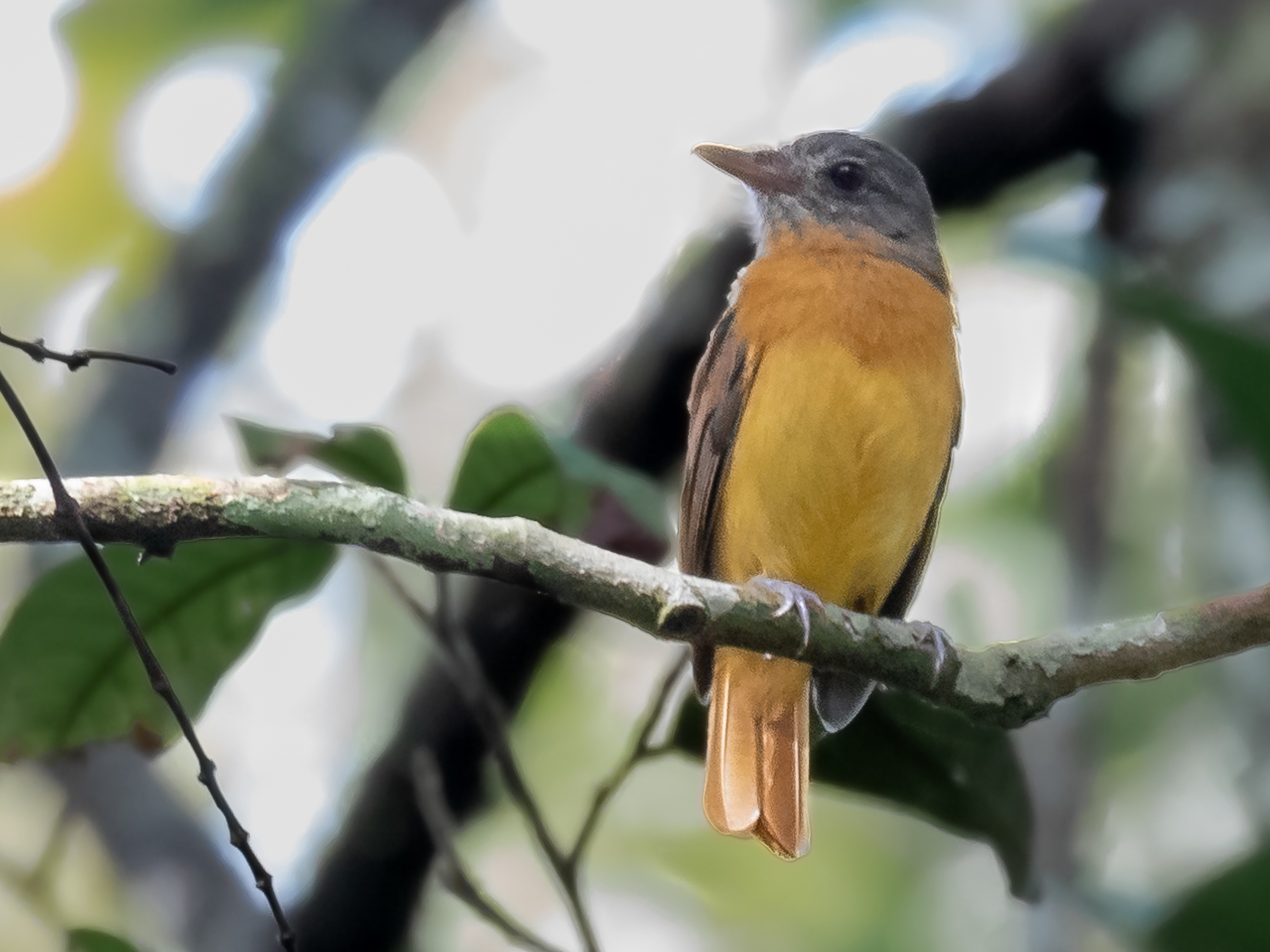

Conservation status
- Least Concern (IUCN 3.1)

Scientific classification
- Kingdom: Animalia
- Phylum: Chordata
- Class: Aves
- Order: Passeriformes
- Family: Tyrannidae
- Genus: Attila
- Species: A. citriniventris

Binomial name
- Attila citriniventris Sclater, PL, 1859

= Citron-bellied attila =

Species of bird

The citron-bellied attila (Attila citriniventris) is a species of bird in the family Tyrannidae, the tyrant flycatchers. It is found in Bolivia, Brazil, Colombia, Ecuador, Peru, and Venezuela.

== Taxonomy and systematics ==
From early in the twentieth century until the 1970s many authors classified genus Attila in family Cotingidae; after that it was recognized as belonging to family Tyrannidae.

The citron-bellied attila is monotypic.

== Description ==
The citron-bellied attila is 18 to 18.5 cm (7.1 to 7.3 in) long and weighs 30 to 38 g (1.1 to 1.3 oz). The sexes have the same plumage. Adults have a dark gray crown and face. Their upperparts and tail are mostly rufous-brown with a paler cinnamon-rufous rump. Their wings are dusky. Their throat is grayish white. Their underparts are mostly bright ochraceous that is yellower on the belly; the lower throat and breast have faint dusky streaks. They have a dark reddish brown iris, a grayish maxilla, a gray-tipped pinkish mandible, and gray legs and feet.

== Distribution and habitat ==
The citron-bellied attila has a disjunct distribution in the western Amazon Basin. Its main range extends from eastern Colombia south through extreme eastern Ecuador and northeastern Peru and from that area east into far southern Venezuela and northwestern Brazil to the Negro River. Scattered populations are found further west in Colombia and further east in Brazil. It first was found in Bolivia, in the extreme northeast, in the early 2000s. It primarily inhabits the interior and edges of terra firme forest. In elevation it reaches 300 m (1,000 ft) in Colombia and Ecuador, 400 m (1,300 ft) in Venezuela, and 500 m (1,600 ft) in Brazil.

== Behavior ==
=== Movement ===
The citron-bellied attila is believed to be a year-round resident.

=== Feeding ===
The citron-bellied attila feeds primarily on large arthropods and also includes fruit in its diet. It typically forages singly, sometimes in pairs, and sometimes joins mixed-species feeding flocks. It mostly forages from the forest's mid-story to its canopy. It takes prey and fruits by gleaning from vegetation and branches after a short sally from a perch.

=== Breeding ===
Nothing is known about the citron-bellied attila's breeding biology.

=== Vocalization ===
The citron-bellied attila's song is "a series of [about] 4–6 loud, rapid and slightly rising whee whistles followed by lower-pitched wu". It also makes "a flat-pitched whee-whee-whee-whee-whee".

== Status ==
The IUCN has assessed the citron-bellied attila as being of Least Concern. It has a very large range; its population size is not known and is believed to be decreasing. No immediate threats have been identified. It is considered uncommon in Colombia and Peru, "rare and seemingly local" in Ecuador, and fairly common in Brazil. In Venezuela it is known only from a small number of records. It is found in several protected areas.
