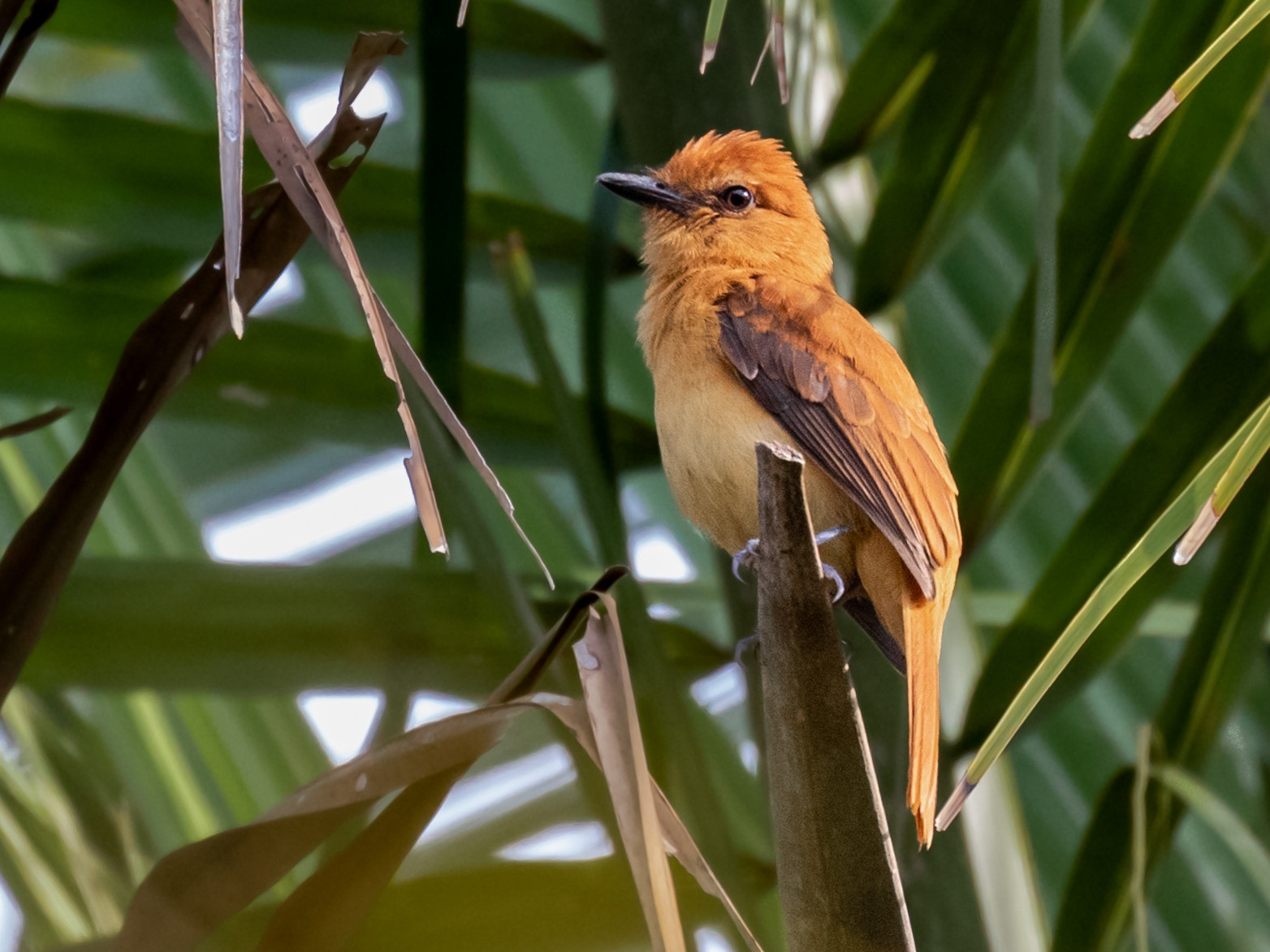

Conservation status
- Least Concern (IUCN 3.1)

Scientific classification
- Kingdom: Animalia
- Phylum: Chordata
- Class: Aves
- Order: Passeriformes
- Family: Tyrannidae
- Genus: Attila
- Species: A. cinnamomeus

Binomial name
- Attila cinnamomeus (Gmelin, JF, 1789)

= Cinnamon attila =

Species of bird

The cinnamon attila (Attila cinnamomeus) is a species of bird in the family Tyrannidae, the tyrant flycatchers. It is found in every mainland South American country except Argentina, Chile, Paraguay, and Uruguay.

== Taxonomy and systematics ==
The cinnamon attila was formally described in 1789 by the German naturalist Johann Friedrich Gmelin in his revised and expanded edition of Carl Linnaeus's Systema Naturae. He placed it with the Old World flycatchers in the genus Muscicapa and coined the binomial name Muscicapa cinnamomea. Gmelin based his description on the "cinnamon flycatcher" that had been described in 1783 by the English ornithologist John Latham in his book A General Synopsis of Birds. Latham had access to a specimen from Cayenne in the Leverian Museum in London. The cinnamon attila is now one of seven flycatchers in the genus Attila that was introduced in 1831 by the French naturalist René Lesson.

From early in the twentieth century until the 1970s many authors classified genus Attila in family Cotingidae; after that it was recognized as belonging to family Tyrannidae. In the early twentieth century the cinnamon attila and the ochraceous attila (A. torridus) were treated as conspecific.

A molecular genetic study published in 2020 found that the cinnamon attila is sister to the rufous-tailed attila (Attila phoenicurus).

The cinnamon attila is monotypic.

== Description ==
The cinnamon attila is about 19.5 to 20.5 cm (7.7 to 8.1 in) long and weighs 28 to 45 g (0.99 to 1.6 oz). The sexes have the same plumage. Adults have a deep rufous head, upperparts, and tail. Their wings are mostly deep rufous with blackish primaries. Their wing coverts are dusky with wide rufous edges. Their underparts are mostly cinnamon-rufous with a somewhat yellower belly. They have a reddish brown iris, a black bill, and gray legs and feet.

== Distribution and habitat ==
The cinnamon attila is a bird of the Amazon and Orinoco basins. It range extends from the southeastern third of Colombia south through eastern Ecuador into northeastern Peru. Its range continues east into Venezuela's Táchira and Amazonas states. In Venezuela its range then resumes in the northeast and extends from there across the Guianas. From southern Colombia, Ecuador, and Peru its range extends across northern Bolivia and across Brazil to the Atlantic, with its southern boundary roughly following the line Rondônia northeast to Maranhão.

The cinnamon attila inhabits a variety of landscapes, most of which are closely associated with water. These include várzea, igapó, and other swampy forest; the edges of oxbow lakes; along small streams; river islands; and palm groves and mangroves in river deltas. In elevation in Brazil it ranges from sea level to 500 m (1,600 ft). It reaches 500 m (1,600 ft) in Colombia, 300 m (1,000 ft) in Ecuador, and 400 m (1,300 ft) in Venezuela.

== Behavior ==
=== Movement ===
The cinnamon attila is believed to be a year-round resident.

=== Feeding ===
The cinnamon attila feeds primarily on large arthropods and also includes small amphibians and fruit in its diet. It typically forages singly or in pairs and seldom joins mixed-species feeding flocks. It mostly forages in the forest's mid-story though it uses all levels. It takes prey and fruits by gleaning from vegetation and branches after a short sally from a perch.

=== Breeding ===
The cinnamon attila's breeding season has not been defined, though nesting has been documented in April, May, and September. Its nest is a shallow cup made from small sticks lined with rootlets; one was noted in a crevice in a tree and another wedged between a bromeliad and a tree trunk. The clutch is two to three eggs. The incubation period, time to fledging, and details of parental care are not known.

=== Vocalization ===
One of the cinnamon attila's songs is "a loud ascending whistle weary weary weary weer-ry". Another is a "slow, reedy series of 3 or more ascending wheer whistles" that is repeated persistently. Its calls are "a loud ringing hawk-like whistle, pü-puéééeeeear" that also is repeated multiple times and a "whoo-whoo-wheeeyeér" that is similar to calls of other Attila species.

== Status ==
The IUCN has assessed the cinnamon attila as being of Least Concern. It has an extremely large range; its population size is not known and is believed to be decreasing. No immediate threats have been identified. It is considered fairly common in Colombia and Ecuador, "uncommon to locally fairly common" in Peru, "fairly common to common...very locally" in Venezuela, and common in Brazil. It occurs in many national parks and other protected areas throughout its range. "Much of its habitat within its relatively large range remains reasonably undisturbed."
