= Liberte Publications =

Turkish publishing company

Liberte Publications (Liberte Yayınları in Turkish) is a publishing company in Turkey established to produce books and journals on liberalism and promoting liberal ideas. It is associated with Liberal Düşünce Topluluğu (Association for Liberal Thinking).

The company was established in 1998 by a group of intellectuals in order to introduce liberal ideas to and thus change the intellectual environment in Turkey. The choice of the Latin word liberte, meaning "liberty", as the company title reflects this ideal. It remains as the only publisher in Turkey to solely produce titles on issues about liberalism. It is based in Ankara.

== Publications ==
Since its establishment Liberte Publications has published over 130 books. Titles include classics of liberalism, studies about contemporary economy with a liberal perspective, research and essays by modern-day Turkish liberals such as Atilla Yayla as well as those of the late Ottoman Empire and some novels such as Murder at the Margin representing the principles of economic thought.

The company also publishes two periodicals on behalf of Liberal Düşünce Topluluğu: Liberal Düşünce (Liberal Thought) and Piyasa (Market).
