= Attila Horváth =

Attila Horváth may refer to:

- Attila Horváth (discus thrower) (1967–2020), Hungarian discus thrower
- Attila Horváth (footballer, born 1971), Hungarian retired international football player
- Attila Horváth (footballer, born 1988), Hungarian footballer for BFC Siófok
- Attila Horváth (handballer) (born 1966), Hungarian former international handball player
