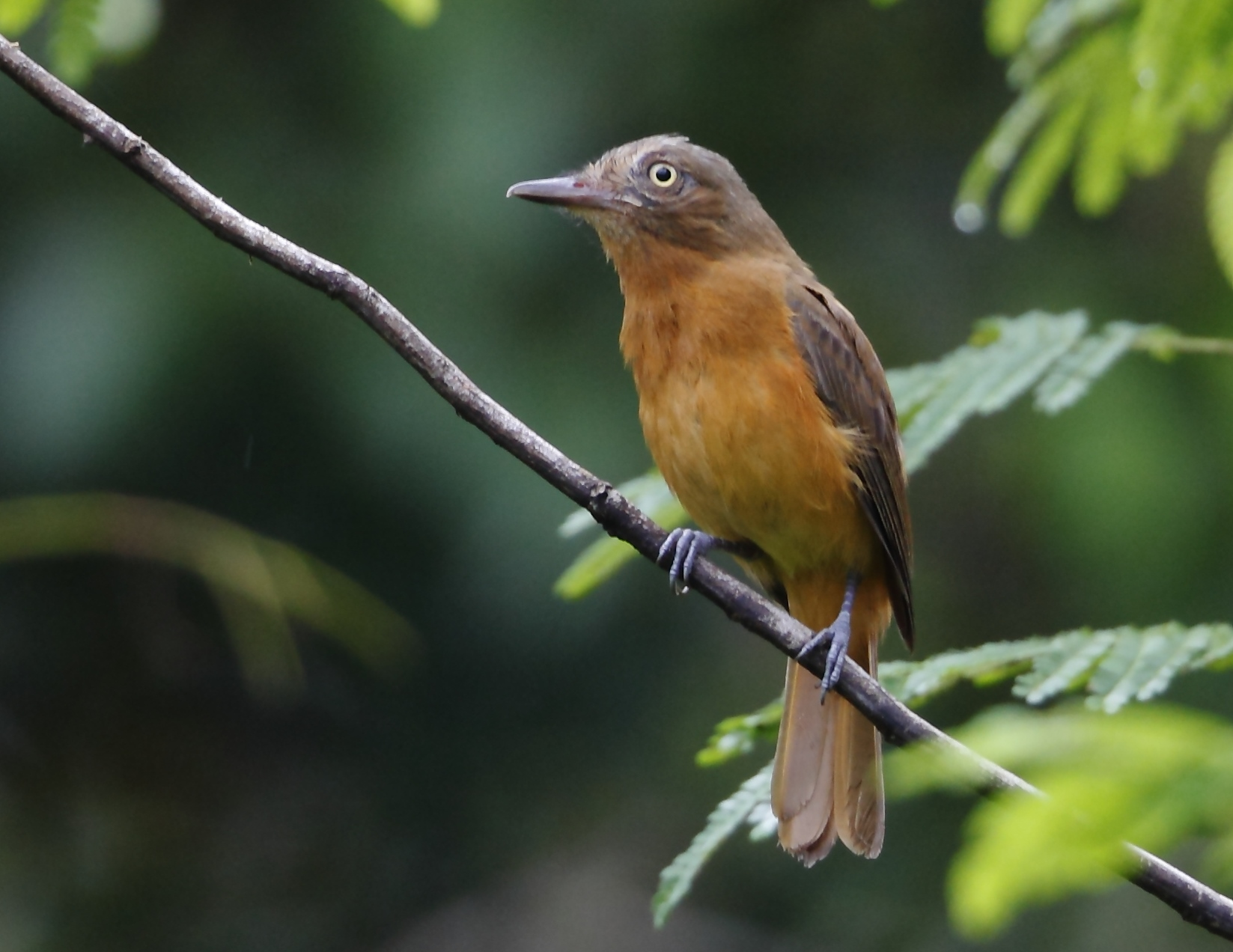
- White-eyed attila at Careiro da Várzea, Amazonas state, Brazil

Conservation status
- Least Concern (IUCN 3.1)

Scientific classification
- Kingdom: Animalia
- Phylum: Chordata
- Class: Aves
- Order: Passeriformes
- Family: Tyrannidae
- Genus: Attila
- Species: A. bolivianus

Binomial name
- Attila bolivianus Lafresnaye, 1848

Subspecies
- See text

= White-eyed attila =

Species of bird

The white-eyed attila or dull-capped attila (Attila bolivianus) is a species of bird in the passerine family Tyrannidae, the tyrant flycatchers. It is found in Bolivia, Brazil, Colombia, and Peru.

== Taxonomy and systematics ==
The white-eyed attila was first described by French ornithologist Frédéric de Lafresnaye in 1848. From early in the twentieth century until the 1970s many authors classified genus Attila in family Cotingidae; after that it was recognized as belonging to family Tyrannidae.

The white-eyed attila has two subspecies, the nominate A. b. bolivianus (Lafresnaye, 1848) and A. b. nattereri (Hellmayr, 1902). Its specific and suspecific epithets bolivianus derive from the country Bolivia. The subspecific epithet "nattereri" honors the Austrian naturalist Johann Natterer.

== Description ==
The white-eyed attila is 19 to 22 cm (7.5 to 8.7 in) long and weighs 40 to 45 g (1.4 to 1.6 oz). The sexes have the same plumage. Adults of the nominate subspecies have a grayish rufous-brown head. Their upperparts are mostly rufous-brown with a bright cinnamon-rufous rump and tail. Their wings are mostly rufous-brown with blackish greater coverts and primaries. Their chin is faintly grayish. Their throat and underparts are mostly cinnamon-rufous that is paler on the belly. Subspecies A. b. nattereri is overall darker than the nominate and has a crown tending to sepia. Both subspecies have a pale yellowish white iris, a horn-colored maxilla, a pinkish tinged horn-colored mandible, and blue-gray legs and feet.

== Distribution and habitat ==
Subspecies A. b. nattereri is the more northerly of the two. It is found from extreme southeastern Colombia south into northeastern Peru's Department of Loreto and east through Brazil along the Amazon almost to the Atlantic. The nominate subspecies is found from Loretta in Peru south into northern and eastern Bolivia and east into southwestern Brazil to southwestern Mato Grosso. Though some sources place nattereri in Ecuador as well, the South American Classification Committee of the American Ornithological Society has no records in that country.

The white-eyed attila inhabits riverine landscapes. In the Amazon Basin it is found in várzea and other swampy forest, typically on river banks and islands. Further south in the Pantanal it is found in gallery forest. In elevation it reaches 150 m (500 ft) in Colombia and 500 m (1,600 ft) in Brazil.

== Behavior ==
=== Movement ===
The white-eyed attila is believed to be a year-round resident.

=== Feeding ===
The white-eyed attila primarily feeds on large arthropods and also includes fruit in its diet. It typically forages singly or in pairs from the forest's understory to midstory. It sometimes joins mixed-species feeding flocks. It perches quietly and takes prey and fruit from foliage and branches while briefly hovering after a short sally.

=== Breeding ===
The white-eyed attila's breeding season has not been defined but includes June in Colombia and September in Peru. One nest was a cup made from rootlets, plant fibers, and moss. It was placed in an epiphyte on a tree trunk 1.3 m (4 ft) above water and contained two eggs. Nothing else is known about the species' breeding biology.

=== Vocalization ===
One description of the white-eyed attila's song is a "slow, rising series of about 10-15 fluted notes, which level out in the 2nd half". Another is "a slow rising series of rising whistles that usually terminates in a lower note, sounding melancholy: wur wer weer wee WEE WEE wurr". Its calls are "quiet pup notes", a "series of rising whistles whip-whip-whip-whip-wheep-wheep", and a "woodpecker-like chatter: TER'terter!".

== Status ==
The IUCN has assessed the white-eyed attila as being of Least Concern. It has a very large range; its population size is not known and is believed to be decreasing. No immediate threats have been identified. It is considered "local and uncommon" in Colombia, "uncommon but widespread" in Peru, and fairly common in Brazil. It occurs in many protected areas both public and private. "Given that much of its habitat within its relatively large range remains more or less undisturbed, it is not at any risk."
