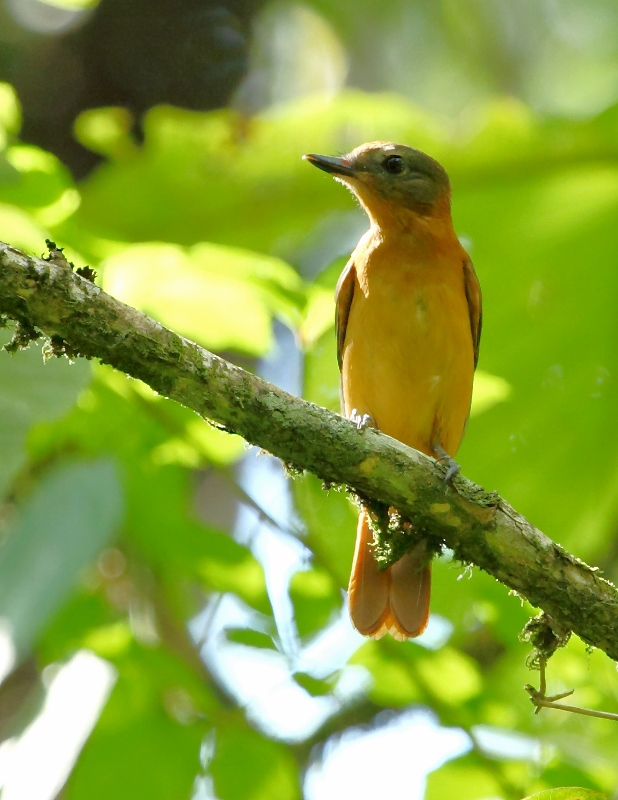
- Rufous-tailed attila at Tapiraí, São Paulo state, Brazil

Conservation status
- Least Concern (IUCN 3.1)

Scientific classification
- Kingdom: Animalia
- Phylum: Chordata
- Class: Aves
- Order: Passeriformes
- Family: Tyrannidae
- Genus: Attila
- Species: A. phoenicurus

Binomial name
- Attila phoenicurus Pelzeln, 1868
- Non-Breeding Breeding

= Rufous-tailed attila =

Species of bird

The rufous-tailed attila (Attila phoenicurus) is a species of bird in the family Tyrannidae, the tyrant flycatchers. It is found in Argentina, Brazil, Paraguay, possibly Bolivia, and as a vagrant to Venezuela.

== Taxonomy and systematics ==
From early in the twentieth century until the 1970s many authors classified genus Attila in family Cotingidae; after that it was recognized as belonging to family Tyrannidae. For a time in the mid-1900s some authors placed the rufous-tailed attila in its own genus Pseudattila; by the 1980s it had been returned to genus Attila.

A molecular genetic study published in 2020 found that the rufous-tailed attila is sister to the cinnamon attila (Attila cinnamomeus).

The rufous-tailed attila is monotypic.

== Description ==
The rufous-tailed attila is about 18 cm (7.1 in) long and weighs about 32 to 34.5 g (1.1 to 1.2 oz). The sexes have the same plumage. Adults have a dark gray crown, face, and nape. Their upperparts are mostly deep rufous with slightly paler uppertail coverts and tail. Their wings are mostly deep rufous with blackish primaries. They have a small whitish area just below the bill. Their throat and underparts are mostly cinnamon-rufous with a wide band of deep rufous across the breast; the band has indistinct edges. They have a dark iris.

== Distribution and habitat ==
The rufous-tailed attila is normally found in a wide swath from northwestern Brazil south to southeastern Brazil, eastern Paraguay, and northern Argentina. It has reached southern Venezuela as a vagrant and there is at least one unconfirmed sight record in Bolivia. It primarily inhabits the interior and edges of humid secondary forest, especially areas dominated by Araucaria, and also scrublands. In elevation it reaches 1,500 m (4,900 ft).

== Behavior ==
=== Movement ===
The rufous-tailed attila breeds in northern Argentina and in southeastern Brazil roughly as far north as São Paulo state. It moves north from that area during the austral winter generally northwesterly into eastern Paraguay and west-central Amazonian Brazil. The exact limits of its breeding and wintering ranges are not known. It has reached Venezuela at least once and has been sighted but not documented in eastern Bolivia.

=== Feeding ===
The rufous-tailed attila's diet has not been studied. It feeds at all levels of the forest though apparently more often from its mid-story up.

=== Breeding ===
Nothing is known about the rufous-tailed attila's breeding biology.

=== Vocalization ===
The rufous-tailed attila's song is a "short, quick series of 4 fluted fee-fee-fifi notes, the 1st 3 rising in pitch [and] the fourth falling off".

== Status ==
The IUCN has assessed the rufous-tailed attila as being of Least Concern. It has a large range; its population size is not known and is believed to be decreasing. No immediate threats have been identified. It is considered fairly common in Brazil and is known from only one area in Venezuela. It occurs in several national parks and other protected areas.
