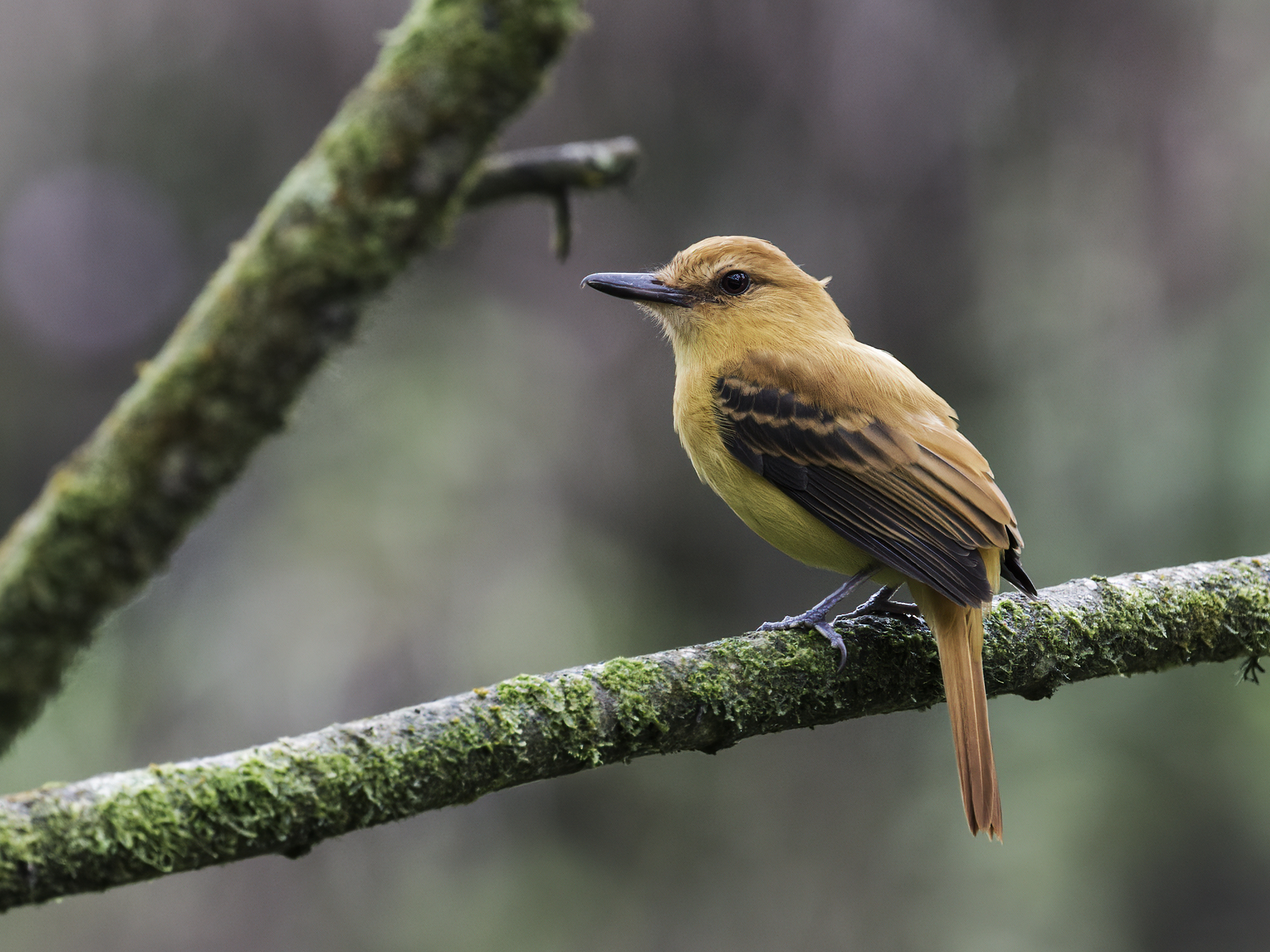

Conservation status
- Near Threatened (IUCN 3.1)

Scientific classification
- Kingdom: Animalia
- Phylum: Chordata
- Class: Aves
- Order: Passeriformes
- Family: Tyrannidae
- Genus: Attila
- Species: A. torridus

Binomial name
- Attila torridus Sclater, PL, 1860

= Ochraceous attila =

Species of bird

The ochraceous attila (Attila torridus) is a Near-threatened species of bird in the family Tyrannidae, the tyrant flycatchers. It is found in Colombia, Ecuador, and Peru.

== Taxonomy and systematics ==
From early in the twentieth century until the 1970s many authors classified genus Attila in family Cotingidae; after that it was recognized as belonging to family Tyrannidae. In the early twentieth century the ochraceous attila and the cinnamon attila (A. cinnamomeus) were treated as conspecific.

The ochraceous attila is monotypic.

== Description ==
The ochraceous attila is 20 to 22 cm (7.9 to 8.7 in) long and weighs about 46 g (1.6 oz). The sexes have the same plumage. Adults have a cinnamon-ochraceous head. Their upperparts are mostly cinnamon-ochraceous with a yellowish rump and base of the tail. Their wings are mostly cinnamon ochraceous with blackish primaries. Their wing coverts are dusky with wide ochraceous edges that show as two wing bars. Their underparts are yellowish ochraceous with the belly being yellowest. They have a reddish brown iris, a dusky bill, and gray legs and feet.

== Distribution and habitat ==
The ochraceous attila is found from extreme southwestern Colombia south through most of western Ecuador and slightly into northwestern Peru's Tumbes Department. It inhabits the interior and edges of semi-humid to humid forest, secondary forest, and nearby clearings and plantations. In elevation it occurs below 200 m (700 ft) in Colombia and below 800 m (2,600 ft) in Peru. In Ecuador it mostly occurs below 1,500 m (4,900 ft) but is found higher in the southern province of Loja.

== Behavior ==
=== Movement ===
The ochraceous attila is believed to be a year-round resident though there have been suggestions of seasonal movements without details.

=== Feeding ===
The ochraceous attila feeds primarily on arthropods and also includes fruit in its diet. It typically forages singly or in pairs. It mostly forages from the forest's mid-story to its canopy. It takes prey and fruits by gleaning from vegetation and branches after a short sally from a perch.

=== Breeding ===
The ochraceous attila is thought to breed during the wet season of January to March but nothing else is known about its breeding biology.

=== Vocalization ===
The ochraceous attila's song is "a mainly rising series of whistled notes, wuuu-wuuu-weee-weee-weeé-weeé-wuyeép!". Its most common call is "a strikingly hawk-eagle-like whoeeeer" that is sometimes "extended into a whoeeeer, wheréu, whit-whit". Another call is "a sharp wheek! or keek".

== Status ==
The IUCN originally in 1998 assessed the ochraceous attila as being of Least Concern. It was reassessed as Vulnerable in 1994 and as Near Threatened in 2024. It occurs patchily in a moderately-sized range and its estimated population of between 5000 and 15,000 mature individuals is believed to be decreasing. "Habitat loss continues, at least in unprotected areas of both Ecuador and Peru...and most remaining lowland forests are in various stages of degradation." "Even protected areas are affected by illegal settling, logging and livestock-grazing." It is considered uncommon in Colombia, "uncommon and local" in Ecuador, and "rare to uncommon" in Peru. "The species is somewhat tolerant of disturbance, as it is found in patchy forest fragments; nevertheless, strongholds are in reserves".
