= Attila Demény =

Hungarian composer (1955–2021)

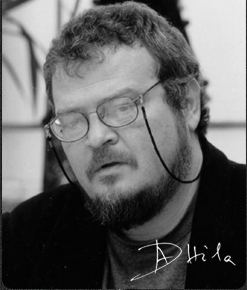

Attila Demény (2 March 1955 – 11 May 2021) was a Romanian composer and theatre director.

Born into an ethnic Hungarian family in Cluj, his parents were Dezső, a psychologist, and Piroska, a folk singer. He died in his native city.
