= ATILA =

- Operating system: Linux, OS X, Windows
- Type: Finite element analysis
- License: Proprietary
- Website: www.mmech.com/atila-fem

ATILA is a finite element analysis software package developed for the analysis of two and three dimensional mechanical structures that contain active piezoelectric & magnetostrictive materials. It is organized around a strong electrical/mechanical coupling and a strong fluid/structure coupling. ATILA is used in many applications including underwater acoustic, seismic, non-destructive testing, medical imaging, RF telecommunications.
