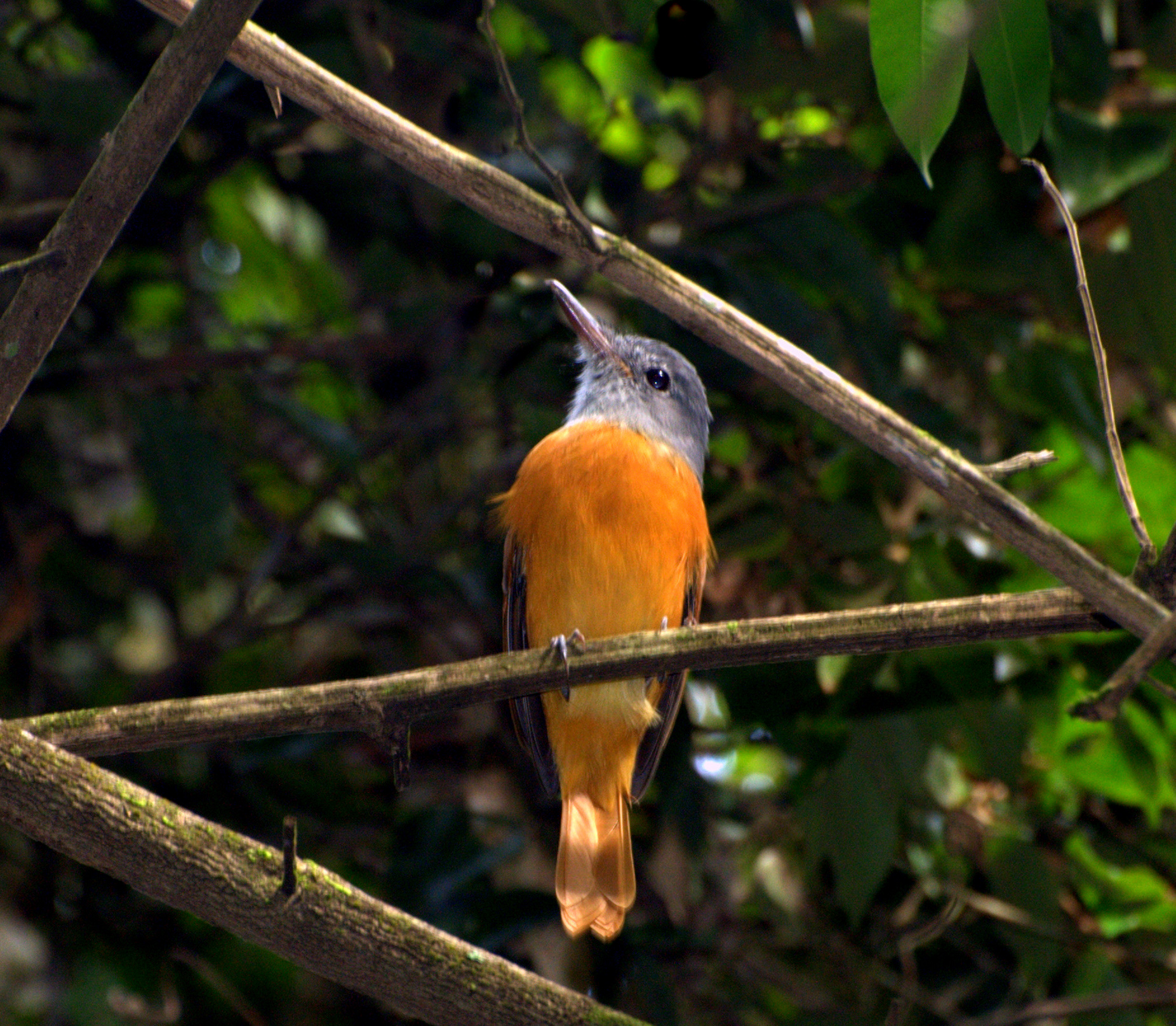
- Grey-hooded attila

Scientific classification
- Kingdom: Animalia
- Phylum: Chordata
- Class: Aves
- Order: Passeriformes
- Family: Tyrannidae
- Genus: Attila; Lesson, RP, 1831

Type species
- Attila brasiliensis = Muscicapa spadicea Lesson, 1831

Synonyms
- Dasycephala

= Attila (bird) =

Genus of birds

Attila is a genus of tropical passerine birds, the attilas. They belong to the tyrant flycatcher family. The species in this genus have large heads and hooked bills; they are markedly predatory and aggressive for their size – hence the scientific and common names, which refer to Attila the Hun.

== Taxonomy ==
The genus Attila was introduced in 1831 by the French naturalist René Lesson to accommodate a single species, the bright-rumped attila, which is therefore considered as the type species. The genus name is from Attila the Hun who attacked Rome and Orléans in the 5th century.

The genus contains seven species:

Image	Scientific name	Common name	Distribution
	Attila phoenicurus	Rufous-tailed attila	southern Paraguay and Brazil; also extreme northeast Argentina, Bolivia and southern Venezuela
	Attila cinnamomeus	Cinnamon attila	Brazil, Colombia, Venezuela, Guyana, Suriname, and French Guiana; also Amazonian Ecuador, Peru, and regions of Bolivia.
	Attila torridus	Ochraceous attila	Colombia, Ecuador, and Peru
	Attila citriniventris	Citron-bellied attila	Brazil, Colombia, Ecuador, Peru, and Venezuela.
	Attila bolivianus	White-eyed attila	Bolivia, Brazil, Colombia, Peru, and possibly Ecuador.
	Attila rufus	Grey-hooded attila	Brazil.
	Attila spadiceus	Bright-rumped attila	northwestern Mexico to western Ecuador, Bolivia and southeastern Brazil, and on Trinidad
