= Attila Pintér =

Attila Pintér may refer to:

- Attila Pintér (footballer, born 1966), Hungarian football manager and former player
- Attila Pintér (footballer, born 1978), Hungarian football defender
