= Attila Horváth (footballer, born 1971) =

Hungarian footballer

Personal information
- Date of birth: 23 January 1971 (age 55)
- Place of birth: Zalaegerszeg, Hungary
- Height: 1.85 m (6 ft 1 in)
- Position: Midfielder

Senior career*
Years	Team	Apps	(Gls)
1991–1996	Zalaegerszegi TE	60	(2)
- VSE St. Pölten
1996	FK Austria Wien	1	(0)
1997–1999	Videoton FC	37	(0)
2000–2001	Mura	4	(0)

International career
1996	Hungary	2	(0)
- * Club domestic league appearances and goals

Attila Horváth (born 23 January 1971) is a retired Hungarian international football player.

== Career ==
During his career, he used to play as a midfielder. On a club level, he has played for Zalaegerszegi TE in his home country, Hungary, until 1996. That summer, he moved to Austrian FK Austria Wien but played only one Austrian Bundesliga match in the early part of the 1996–97 season. Still in that season, he returned to Hungary, signing this time with Videoton FC, where he will play until 1999. In summer 2000, he signed with Slovenian NK Mura, playing in the 2000–01 Slovenian PrvaLiga season.

== National team ==
He has played two matches for the Hungary national team, both in April 1996, one against Croatia and another against Austria.
