= Atila Huseyin =

Turkish / British jazz singer

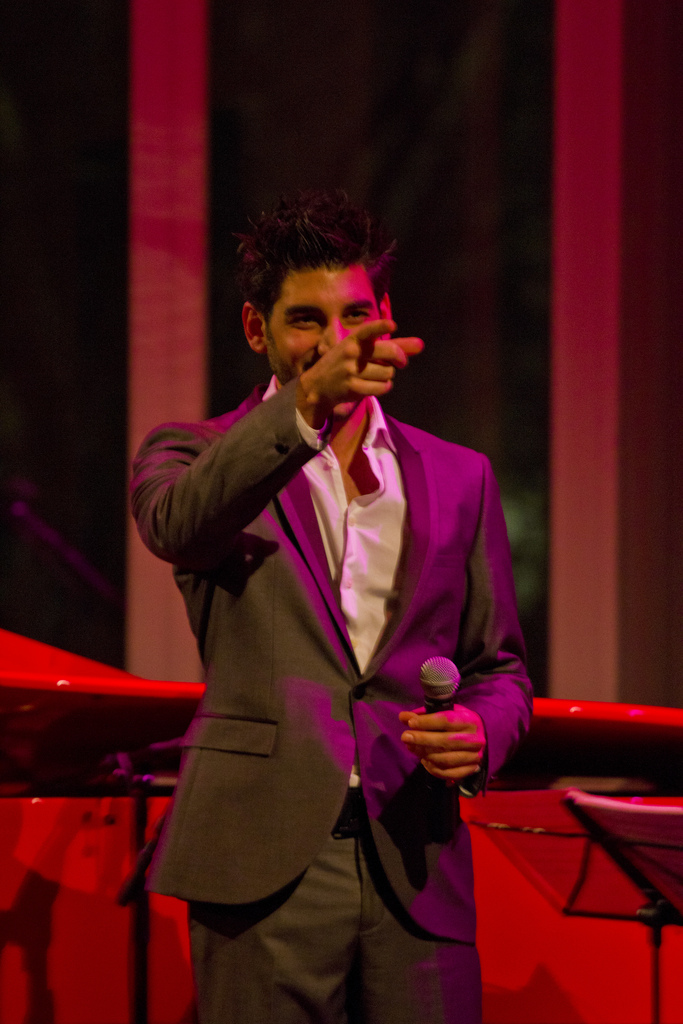

Background information
- Born: London, United Kingdom
- Genres: Jazz
- Occupation: Musician
- Instrument: Vocals
- Website: Official Website

Atila Huseyin is a British jazz singer.

== Biography ==
In February 2002, Huseyin was invited by the British jazz musician Bill Ashton to work with the National Youth Jazz Orchestra. By June 2005, he had released his first solo CD, called Something Old, Something New, which gained positive reviews. Digby Fairweather stated that it is "the best I've heard from a British singer and orchestra since Dame Cleo and Sir John Dankworth's Shakespeare and All That Jazz". His second album was called "How Do You Keep the Music Playing". In April 2006, Huseyin toured with the American musician Buddy Greco; afterwards, Greco stated that "I was knocked out by Atila. He has the voice and the class to show the world what great music is all about". In 2008, Greco invited Huseyin to tour the United Kingdom, the highlights of this included an appearance with the BBC Big Band at the 30th Edinburgh Jazz and Blues Festival.

== Personal life ==
Huseyin was born into a Turkish Cypriot family in London, United Kingdom.
