= Atilla Iskifoglu =

British-Turkish champion bartender and master mixologist

Atilla Iskif
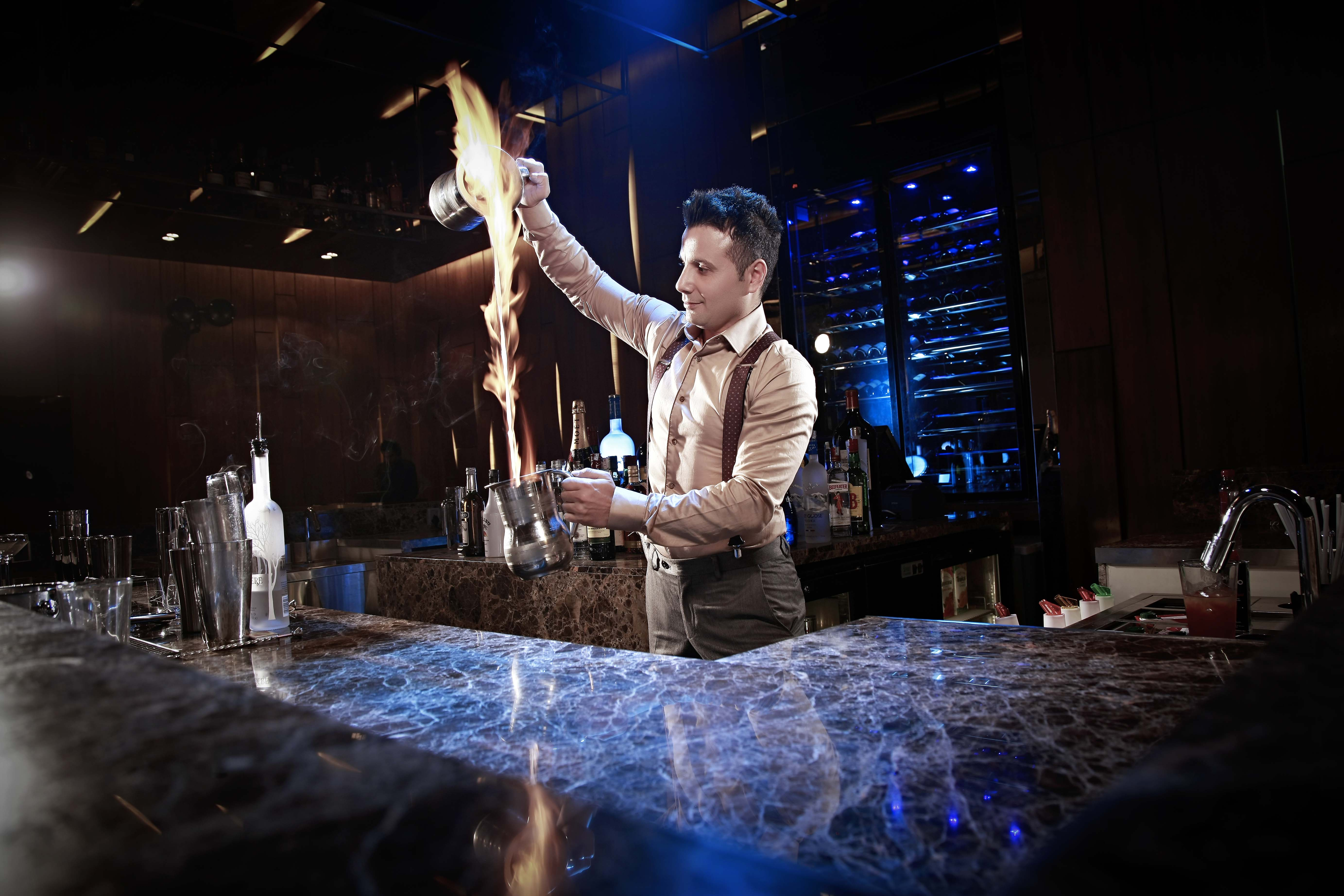
- Born: 1988 (age 37–38)
- Occupation: Master Mixologist
- Known for: Four-time European Bar Show Champion and bar industry social media star.

Atilla Iskif is a British-Turkish flair bartender. He has earned accolades internationally in several countries. He is a four-time Bar Show Champion and a global social media star with millions of followers. He leverages his experience and knowledge to train bartenders all around the globe, having trained around 2000 bartenders in 15 countries. Atilla gained notable recognition on the BBC 6 O’clock News in London while representing the UK at the World Championships in Cuba. In 2009, he played a crucial role in popularizing performance bartending, captivating audiences, judges, and viewers at home with his remarkable performance on Britain’s Got Talent, Atilla gained millions of followers across the social media accounts as well as managing the entire bar operations at celebrity Chefs Nusret Salbae Restaurants in the United States.

== Celebrity performances ==
Iskifoglu has performed flair bartending for Sting, John Travolta, Madonna, Darius, Simon Cowell and Piers Morgan.

- Sting - Jodhpur "indian head injury foundation" Sting concert after party" 2013
- Simon Cowell - Britains Got Talent - London -2009
- Piers Morgan - Britains Got Talent - 2009
- Amanda Holden - Britains Got Talent - London 2009
- John Travolta - Super Bowl - Miami 2007
- Sugar babes, Lemar, Darius, Lulu - Orbit Bar - 2000/2006

== Media and interviews ==
- Behind Bars
- In full spirits
- Flair for fun
- The art of responsible bartending
- Incredible Flair
- Liquid Mag
- Balanced Bartender
- Bloomberg TV "Known for a skills in mixology and flair bartending Atilla Iskifoglu is in India." TV coverage on YouTube from 5:30 minutes.
- BBC London Drink journalist Nigel Barden talking about Atilla Iskifoglu
- ITV LondonBritain's got talent series 3 live on TV

== International awards ==
- Performed on Britain's got talent
