= Attila Fekete =

Attila Fekete may refer to:

- Attila Fekete (fencer) (born 1974), Hungarian fencer
- Attila Fekete (footballer) (born 1987), Hungarian footballer
