= Atilla Yayla =

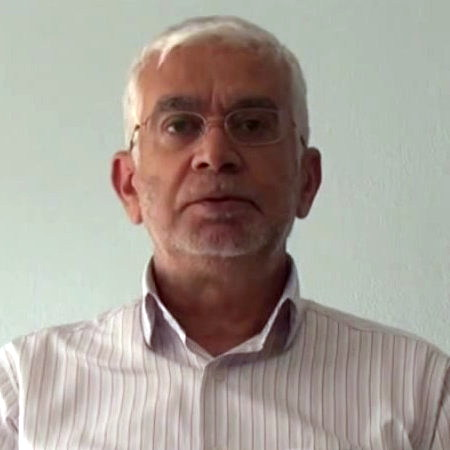
- Atilla Yayla (June 2013)
- Born: 3 March 1957; Kaman, Kırşehir, Turkey

Academic background
- Education: Ankara University; B.A. in Economics, 1980; M.A. in Public Administration, 1983; PhD in Political Sciences, 1986
- Influences: Bastiat • Hayek • Hobbes • Hume • Locke • Mises

Academic work
- Discipline: Political economy, ethics, civil rights
- School or tradition: Liberalism

Atilla Yayla

2nd Chairperson of Association for Liberal Thinking
- In office 1997–2008
- Preceded by: Kazım Berzeg
- Succeeded by: Bican Şahin

Atilla Yayla

4th Chairperson of Association for Liberal Thinking
- Incumbent
- Assumed office 2014
- Preceded by: Bican Şahin

Atilla Yayla (Turkish: [atiɫɫa jajɫa], born March 3, 1957), is a Turkish political thinker and a proponent of liberal democracy. He is one of the founders of Association for Liberal Thinking in Turkey. He was Professor of Politics, Political Economy and Political Philosophy at Gazi University in Turkey. After his retirement from the public sector in 2009, Yayla became head of the International Relations department at Faculty of Commercial Sciences of Istanbul Commerce University until he was fired in 2015. In 2016 he was fired from his teaching post at Haliç University, after the University administration was charged with corruption and turned over to Istanbul University by The Council of Higher Education (YÖK). Yayla lost the case against Haliç University administration in 2019 and was ordered to pay the court fees.

He is currently a faculty member at the Political Science and Public Administration Department of Istanbul Medipol University.

Yayla also wrote articles in the 1980s for the magazine Yeni Forum, and later in the 2000s and 2010s for daily newspapers Zaman, Yeni Şafak, and Yeni Yüzyıl.

== Life and career ==
He was born in 1957 in Kaman, Kırşehir.

As an undergraduate, he studied economics at Ankara University, going on to earn a master's degree in public administration and a Ph.D in political science (1986).

In the mid-1980s, around 1984-85 according to his statement, he embraced liberal views. In 1992 Yayla founded the Association for Liberal Thinking (ALT) with his colleagues and served as its chairperson between 1997 and 2008. He remains an active member of ALT.

He was a visiting professor at the University of Buckingham. He was the winner of the Anthony Fisher Prize in 2000 for his book "Islam, Civil Society and Market Economy". Yayla was awarded the Person of the Year Award by the Stockholm Network in 2007.

== Court case ==
In 2006, Yayla was charged with insulting the legacy of Mustafa Kemal Atatürk by calling him "that man" in a speech where he argued that the one-party period of the Republic of Turkey was less democratic than the preceding period of constitutional monarchy under Ottoman Empire and the early and short-lived multi-party period of the Republic of Turkey, and also strongly criticized the cult of personality that has grown up around Atatürk since. Some newspapers, notably Yeni Asır proclaimed him a traitor. In a court case, he was convicted and received a suspended 15-month jail sentence. Yayla was also dismissed temporarily from his academic post.

== Work and views ==
In 2008 Yayla was one of the signees of the Özür Diliyorum (I Apologize) campaign that caused an enormous reaction in Turkey by the government and the public. The declaration read as "My conscience does not accept the insensitivity showed to and the denial of the Great Catastrophe that the Ottoman Armenians were subjected to in 1915. I reject this injustice and for my share, I empathize with the feelings and pain of my Armenian brothers and sisters. I apologize to them."

Yayla supported The Kurdish Initiative project launched by the AKP government in 2009 to improve the human rights of Kurdish citizens of Turkey, and praised the advisory group, Akil İnsanlar Heyeti (The Wise People Commission), organized by the government to contribute to the solution process.

In an article titled "Constitutional monarchy or republic?" published on 21 September 2022 in the daily paper Türkiye, Yayla stated that while almost all constitutional monarchies were democracies, a significant number of republics were ruled by undemocratic authoritarian and totalitarian regimes, even some like North Korea, Syria, etc. virtually had a ruling dynasty. He then made a distinction between republics in the narrow sense of the term, which often put an end to monarchy but did not let the people freely choose the government through free multiparty elections, and republics in the broader sense of the term which have democracy through pluralist and competitive elections. He said that while the former is undemocratic, even sometimes totalitarian, the latter "is in compliance with democracy more easily, is even identical with democracy in many cases". Finally he said: "I think one can say that constitutional monarchies are compatible with democracy better and easier than republics in the narrow sense of the term in particular." Also, as a vocal critic of the one-party regime in Turkey that lasted roughly from the proclamation of the republic in 1923 until the end of the rule of Republican People's Party in 1950, Yayla also questioned if Turkey had better remained a constitutional monarchy in a tweet posted 26 May 2023, saying: "Perhaps constitutional monarchy, and not republic, was a better path for Turkish democracy. Unfortunately, it's very risky even to write and discuss this. However, it's also fact that the most stable democracies in Europe are constitutional monarchies."

Yayla is the author of many books and articles in English and Turkish on terrorism, liberalism, constructivist rationalism, social justice, and Friedrich Hayek.

== Books ==
Several of Yayla's books are published by Liberte Yayınları (Liberte Publications), a company associated with the Liberal Düşünce Topluluğu (Association for Liberal Thinking).

- On Terrorism (1990)
- Liberalism (1992, 1994, 1997, 2000, 2003)
- Liberal Approaches (1993, 2000)
- The Road to Freedom (1993, 2000)
- Social and Political Theory (ed.) (1994, 2000)
- Rules and Order (Turkish translation of book by F.A. Hayek, 1994)
- On the Welfare Party (with Melih Yürüsen) (1996, in Turkish and German)
- On Turkish Political Parties (with Melih Yürüsen) (1996, in Turkish and German)
- Introduction to Political Theory (1998)
- Islam, Civil Society and the Market Economy (ed.) (1999, in English)
- Road to Freedom: the Social and Economic Philosophy of Hayek (2000, in Turkish)
- Guide to Protect Democracy (2001, in Turkish)
- Statist Mentality and Market Economy (2001, in Turkish)
- Dictionary of Political Thought (2007, 5th ed., in Turkish)
- Market Civilization (2004, in Turkish)

== Selected articles ==
- “Terrorism: A Conceptual Framework” (1980)
- "Terrorism in Turkey" (PDF). SBF Dergisi. 44 (3). Ankara University: 249–262. 1989. ISSN 0378-2921. Archived from the original (PDF) on 2008-10-30.
- “On Theories of Justice” (1991)
- “Constructivist Rationalism, Justice, and Socialism” (1993)
- “The Theoretical and Actual Meaning of Human Rights” (1994)
- “Minorities and Religious Freedom in Democracies: The Case of the Amish Community” (1997, in English and Turkish)
- “Cultural Clashes Between Minorities and Larger Society in Democracies” (in English, 1997)
- “Islam, Secularism and Democracy in Turkey” (1998)
- “Information Age: Some Misunderstandings” (1998)
- “A Guide to ‘Protect' Democracy” (2000)
- "Freedom of expression in Turkey". International Herald Tribune. 2006-12-07. Archived from the original on May 12, 2008.
- "Freedom of Expression Under Attack in Turkey". International Society for Individual Liberty.
- "Seçimlerden Çıkan Sonuçlar" (The Results of the Elections), Yeni Forum 5, No. 112 (1 May 1984): 10.
- "Demokratik Sistemde Basın Sorumluluğu" (The Responsibility of the Press in a Democratic System), Yeni Forum 5, No. 118 (1 August 1984): 10-11.
- "Dünya'da ve Türkiye'de Terör" (Terrorism in the World and in Turkey), Yeni Forum 6, No. 128 (1 January 1985): 36-37.
