= Attila Kovács =

Attila Kovács may refer to:

- Attila Kovács (athlete) (born 1960), Hungarian former sprinter
- Attila Kovács (fencer) (1939–2010), Hungarian fencer
- Attila Kovács (footballer, born 1981), Hungarian footballer for Ceglédi VSE
- Attila Kovacs (footballer, born 1956), Hungarian footballer
- Attila Kovács (swimmer) (born 2004), Hungarian swimmer at Swimming at the 2024 European Aquatics Championships – Men's 200 metre freestyle
