= Atilla Koca =

Turkish footballer

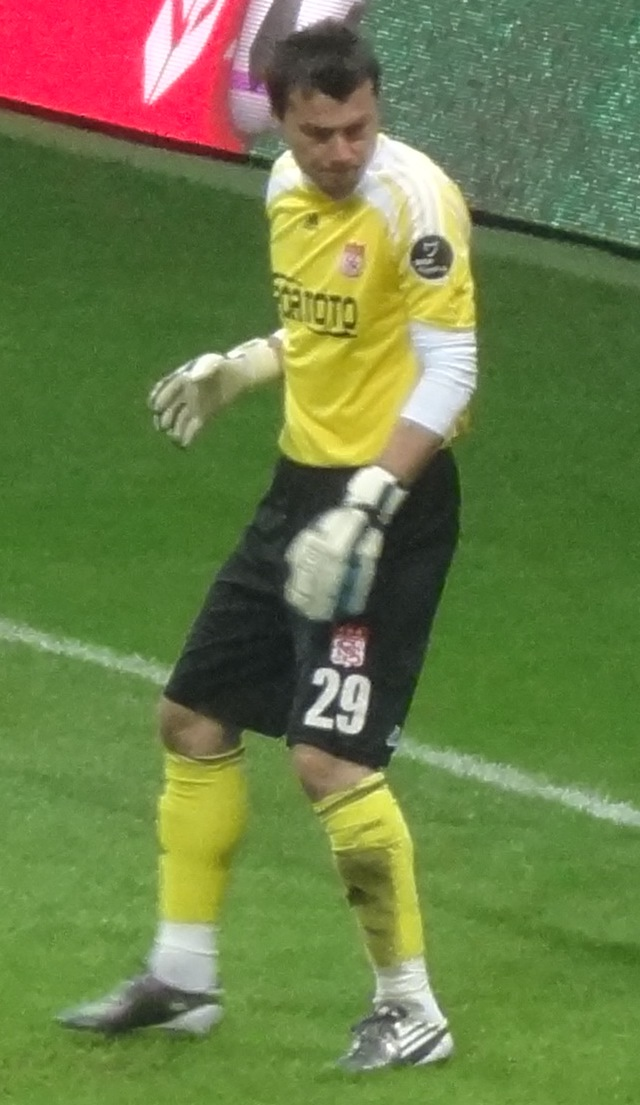

Personal information
- Full name: Atilla Koca
- Date of birth: 16 July 1980 (age 46)
- Place of birth: Gümüşhane, Turkey
- Height: 1.86 m (6 ft 1 in)
- Position: Goalkeeper

Team information
- Current team: Darica Genclerbirligi
- Number: 29

Youth career
- 1998–2001: Fenerbahçe S.K.

Senior career*
Years	Team	Apps	(Gls)
2001–2002	Uşakspor	31	(0)
2002–2005	Kartalspor	47	(0)
2005–2006	Çaykur Rizespor	8	(0)
2006–2008	Diyarbakırspor	55	(0)
2009	Sakaryaspor	17	(0)
2009–2011	Eskişehirspor	7	(0)
2011–2013	Sivasspor	20	(0)
2013–2014	Kayseri Erciyesspor	17	(0)
2014–2015	Adanaspor	9	(0)
2015–	Darica Genclerbirligi	2	(0)
- * Club domestic league appearances and goals as of 1 September 2015

Atilla Koca (born 16 July 1980) is a Turkish professional footballer who currently plays as a goalkeeper for Darica Genclerbirligi.
