= Attila Simon =

Attila Simon may refer to:

- Attila Simon (footballer, born 1979), Hungarian footballer for Békéscsaba 1912 Előre SE
- Attila Simon (footballer, born 1983), Hungarian footballer for Dorogi FC
- Attila Simon (footballer, born 1988), Hungarian footballer for Répcelaki SE
- Attila Simon (runner) (born 1939), Hungarian Olympic athlete
- Attila Simon (sport shooter) (born 1970), Hungarian sport shooter
