= Etelka Freund =

Hungarian pianist

Etelka Freund (1879 – 27 May 1977) was a Hungarian pianist.

A disciple of Ferruccio Busoni, she played regularly for Johannes Brahms during her training years. An international career, throughout which she was an early exponent of Béla Bartók's music, followed her 1901 debut. She brought it to a halt in 1910, resuming it in the mid-1930s. She made her American debut in 1947, at the National Gallery of Art.
