= Attila (heavy metal band) =

American heavy metal band

- Origin: New York City
- Genres: Heavy metal
- Years active: 1983–1986
- Label: Shattered
- Past members: A.T. Soldier; John DeLeon; Vincent Paul Manfredi; Mike Buccel; Jim Bachi

Attila was an American heavy metal band from New York City, active between 1983 and 1986. The group released their sole full-length album, Rolling Thunder, in 1986 on Shattered Records. The group also donated the track "Lucifer's Hammer" to the 1985 compilation album Speed Metal Hell Vol. 1. They also appeared on the Mausoleum Records compilation Metal over America with the tracks "Interceptor" and "Urban Commandos".

After the breakup of the band, drummer Anthony "A.T. Soldier" Tedeschi became a firefighter and was captain of FDNY Squad 270.

== Members ==
Last known lineup:

- A.T. Soldier (Anthony Tedeschi)- Drums, backing vocals
- John DeLeon- Guitar
- Vincent Paul Manfredi- Bass, vocals (died 2017)

Other known members:

- Mike Buccel- Bass
- Jim Bachi- Guitar

== Discography ==
Rolling Thunder (1986, Shattered)
