= Attila the Hun (disambiguation) =

Attila the Hun (?–453) was the ruler of the Huns from 434 until his death in 453.

Attila the Hun or Atilla the Hun may also refer to:

- Atilla the Hun (calypso singer), born Raymond Quevedo (1892–1962), Trinidadian calypsonian
- Attila the Hun (pinball), a pinball machine first manufactured in 1984

== See also ==
- Attila (disambiguation)
