= Atilla Kuzu =

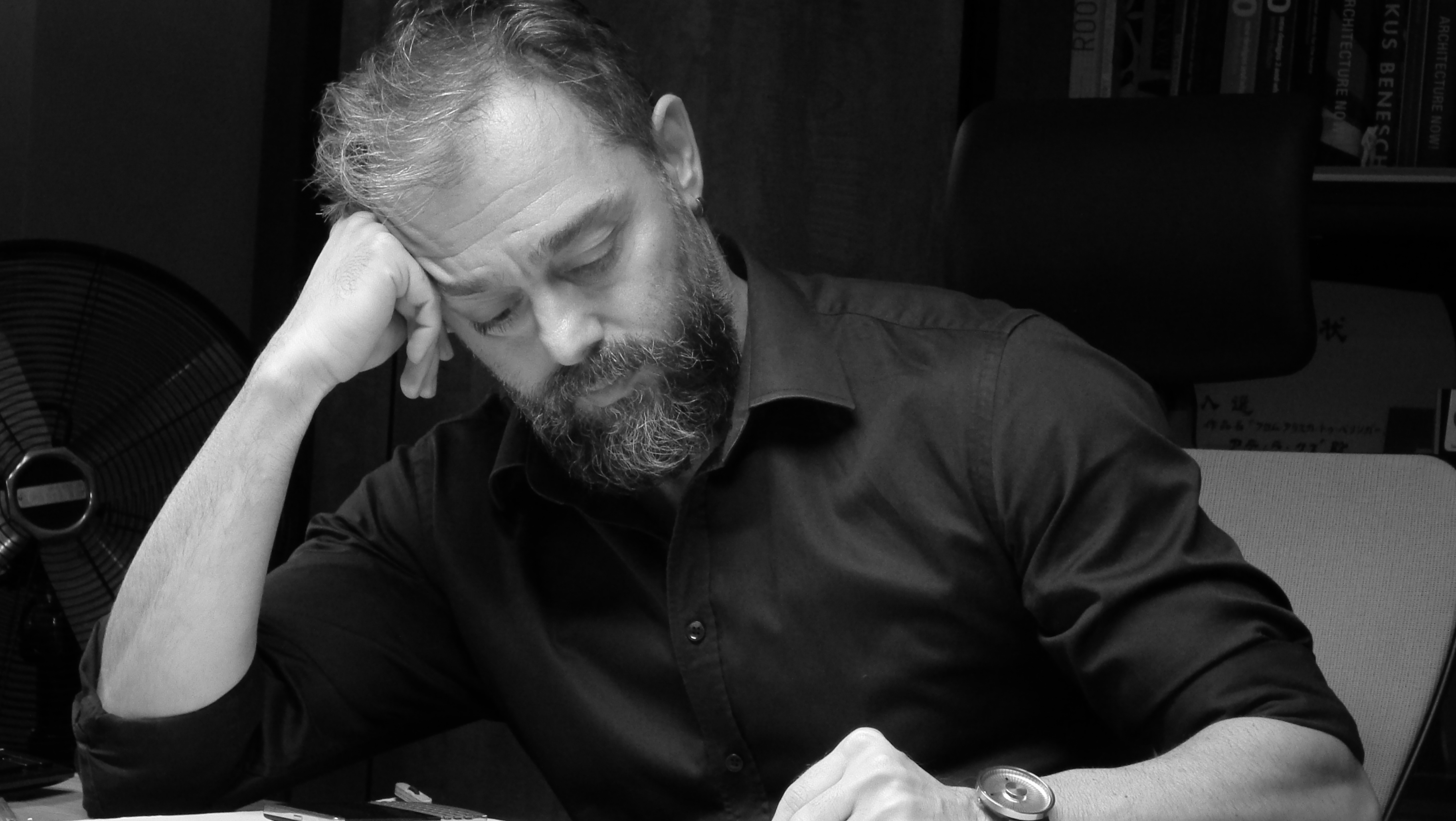
- Born: 11 August 1963 (age 63); Istanbul, Turkey
- Education: Marmara University Faculty of Fine Arts, Industrial Design Department, Interior Design Art Major
- Occupations: Interior Designer, Furniture Designer
- Known for: Taklamakan bench, Barringer coffee table
- Website: http://www.zoom.com.tr

Atilla Kuzu (born 11 August 1963 in Istanbul) is a Turkish interior designer and furniture designer.

== Biography ==
He studied Industrial Design at Marmara University and graduated in 1987. He founded Zoom TPU in 1994 with architect Levent Çırpıcı. His design Taklamakan was selected as a finalist in 1999 at IFDA (International Furniture Design Fair Asahikawa) "Design with love, love with wood" furniture design competition. Taklamakan has been chosen for the collection of the museum MARTa Herford which is one of the most distinguished museum of Europe presenting contemporary works; bringing together the art, design and architecture of Frank Gehry, one of the most important architects alive. His another work Barringer coffee table was selected among the works of another 820 designers in 2002 again at IFDA. Barringer coffee table is now among the catalogue of Conde House Europe along with Atilla Series which consists of a series of furniture designed by Atilla Kuzu. He was selected as one of the 50 most creative Turks. His interior design works are influenced by fractal design.

== Awards ==
- Good Design Award, Design Turkey Awards, with his design Angle Table, produced by 888 Design, 2010
- Elle Decor International Design Awards, “Designer of the Year” Turkey, 2010
- Selected as one of the best 30 designers from 46 countries in IFDA “From Alaska to Barringer” Wood Furniture Designing Competition, with his design named “Barringer”, 2002
- Finalist in IFDA Wood Furniture Designing Competition, with bench named “Taklamakan”, Japan, 1999
