= C-Quals =

School of the Turkish Republic of Northern Cyprus

The Quality Cyprus Education & Language is a school of the Turkish Republic of Northern Cyprus. It has two buildings, one in Nicosia and one in Girne. It was founded in 2009 by Ms. Ferdyie Ersoy. The institution prepares to higher levels of qualification in English and French with among others the IGCSE is recognized for Bac levels and below the license. This examination allows to prepare the Advance Level reserved for higher levels. The school prepares the TOEFL, the IGCSE and the IETS for English and competitions for IGCSE and DELF French. German, Turkish, Russian, and Greek are also offered by the school to try the IGCSE contest. The school owes part of his success to his teachers have been extended in France and England holidays.

== Staffing ==
The school has 10 teachers aggregated. In total, more than 500 students entered the school since its inception in 2009. Feature of this school is that it welcomes students of all ages and backgrounds. Adults are likely to register to attend private classes in order to advance more quickly. They represent 20% of the total number of students of the school.

== The school partners ==
The school has many especially foreign partner organizations of France and Great Britain. The main ones are: the French Institute of Cyprus, the British Council, Cambridge University Press, Oxford University Press and the Oxford Teacher's Academy.

== The events organized by the school ==
In addition to the courses offered, the school offers the possibility of exchange with partner schools. This was the case in 2012 with a school in Upper Brittany that in a cultural exchange program offered a concert in Nicosia. Currently a program to Barcelona is about to be completed with the participation of 15 young people. Every year, in partnership with the French Institute of Cyprus, the school organizes an evening of "music festival".
