= Osman Türkay =

Osman Türkay (born February 16, 1927, in Ozanköy – 2001) was a Turkish Cypriot poet, writer, and literary critic. He was a nominee for the Nobel Prize in Literature in 1988.

After completing his studies at a private school in Kyrenia, Türkay went to London where he read philosophy and studied journalism, after which he was employed on the staff of several magazines and newspapers.

The internationally acclaimed poet, whose literary output includes a number of published books and anthologies, has been credited with many honours in recognition of his contributions to the literature.

In his latest works, Türkay has shown a greater tendency towards working in English and his poetry has also become more abstract in essence and concept. His notable "space age" poetry has won him recognition.

His works are published in more than 30 languages.
