= Kyrenia =

City and municipality in Northern Cyprus

Kyrenia Κερύνεια (Greek) Girne (Turkish)
- City and municipality
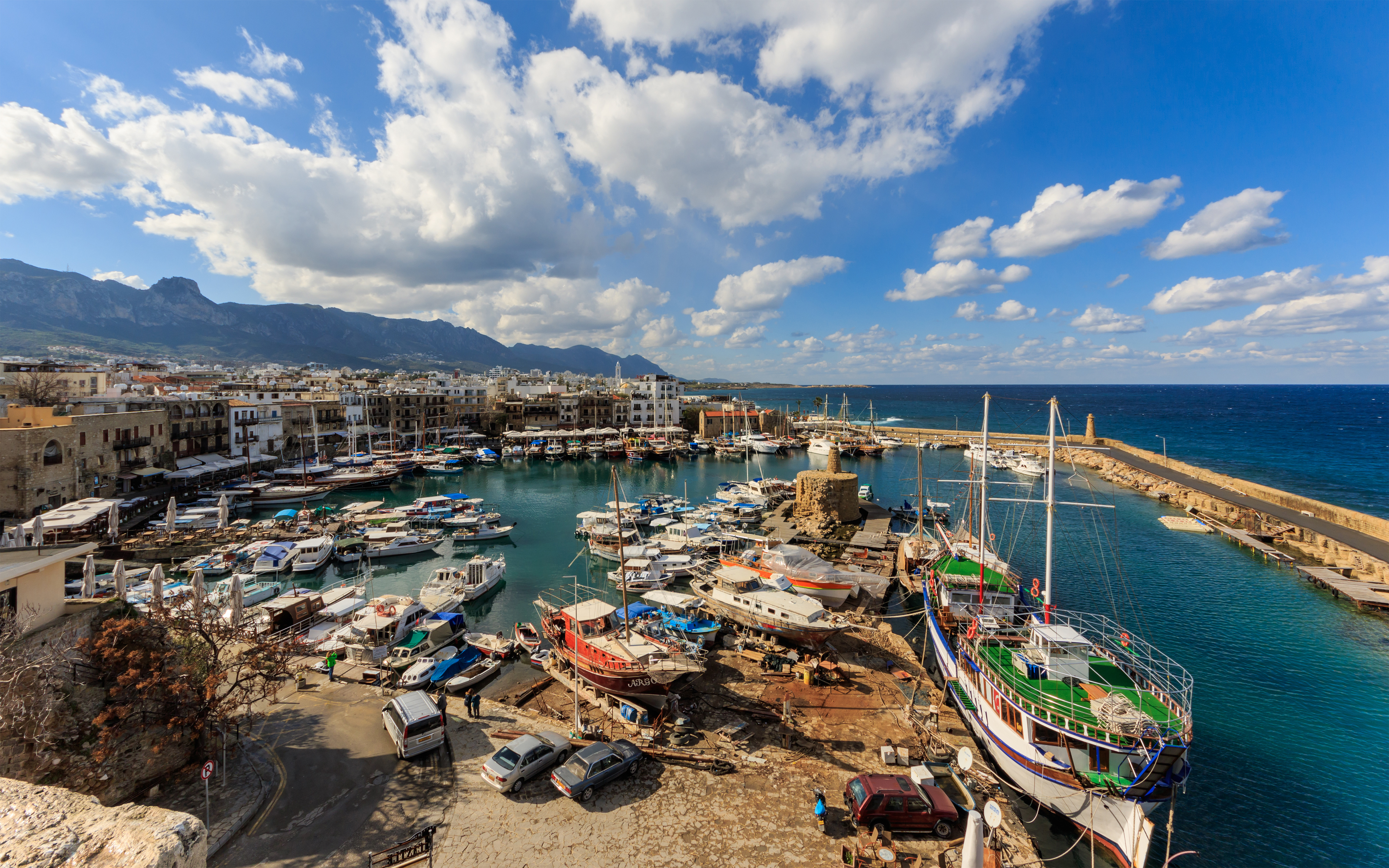
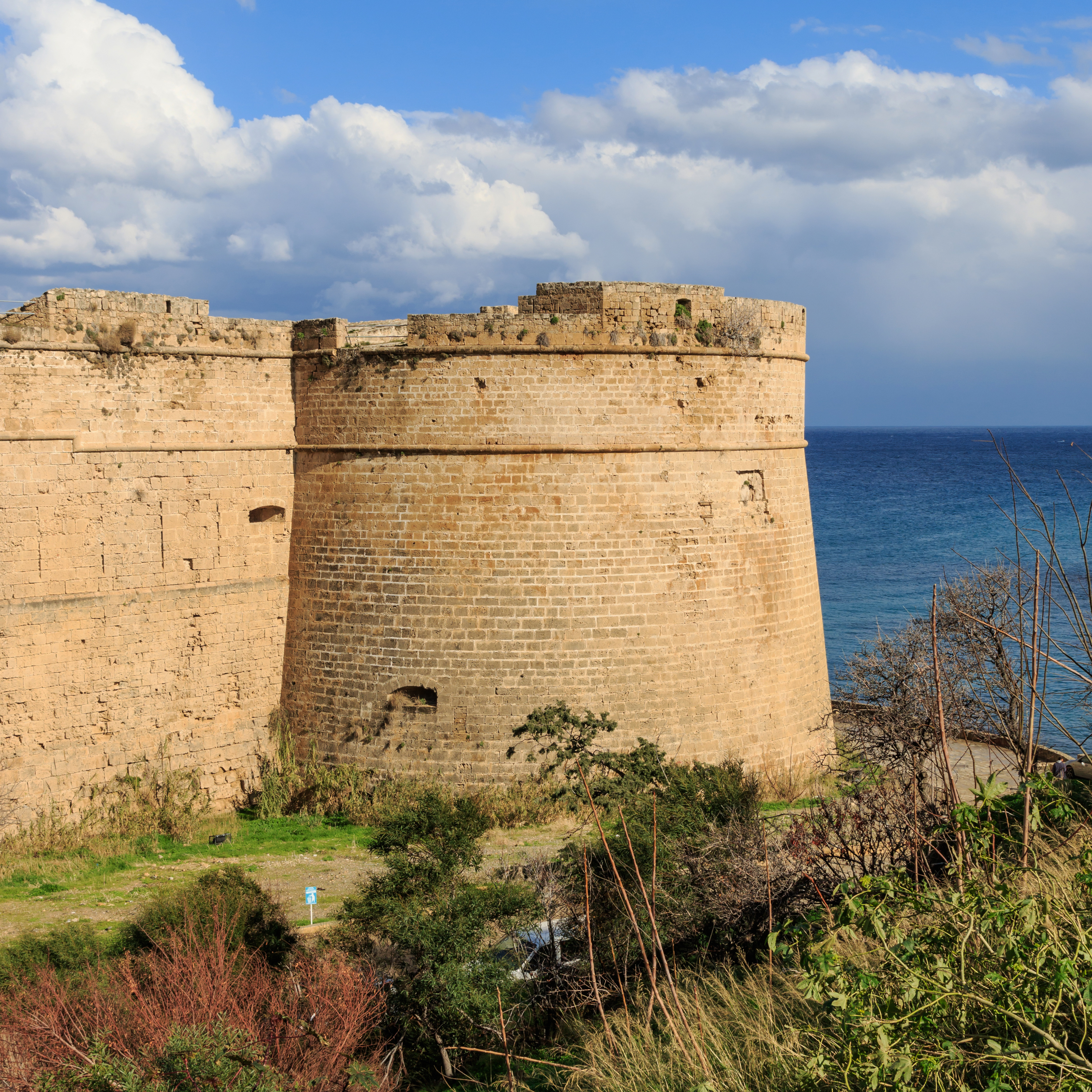
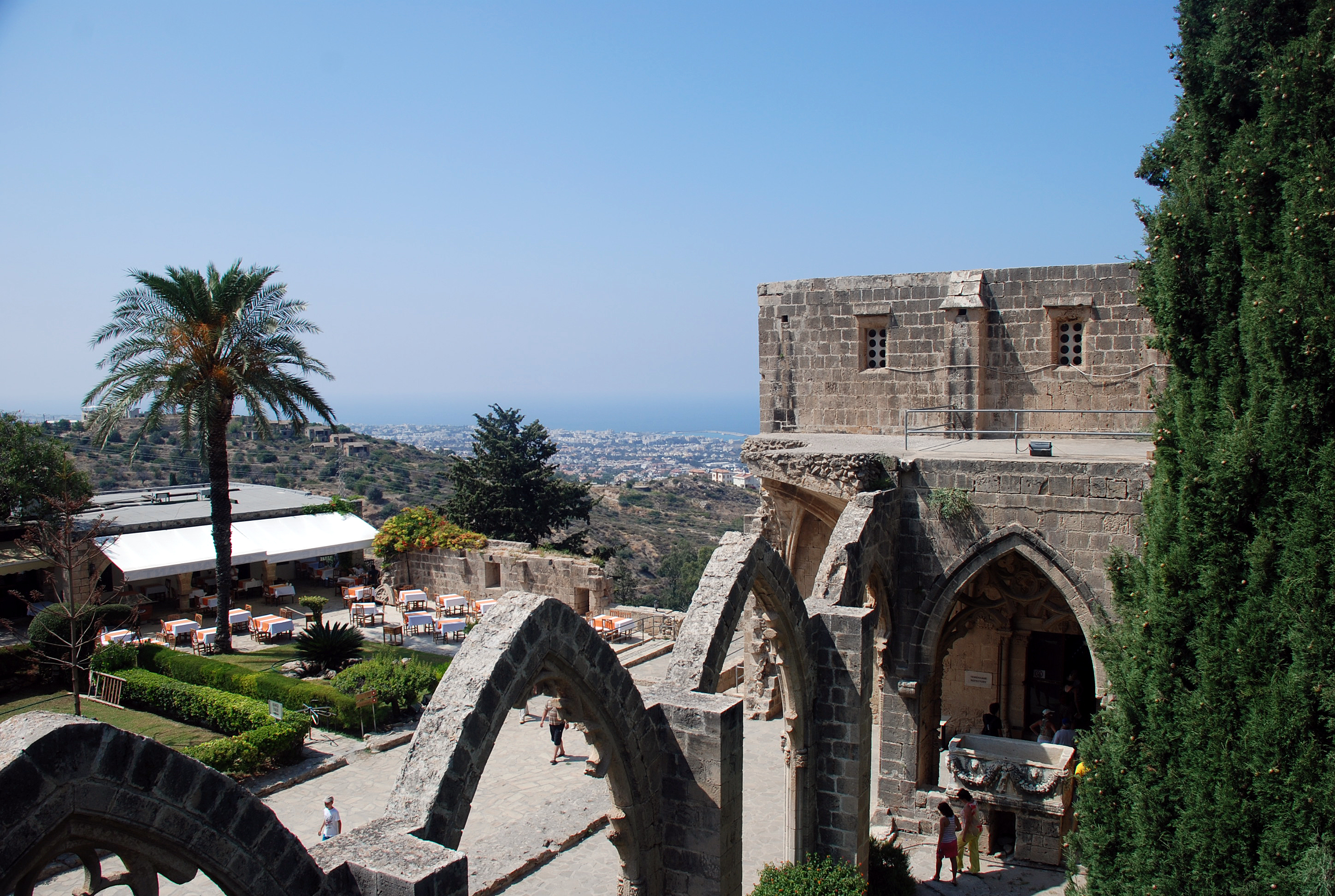
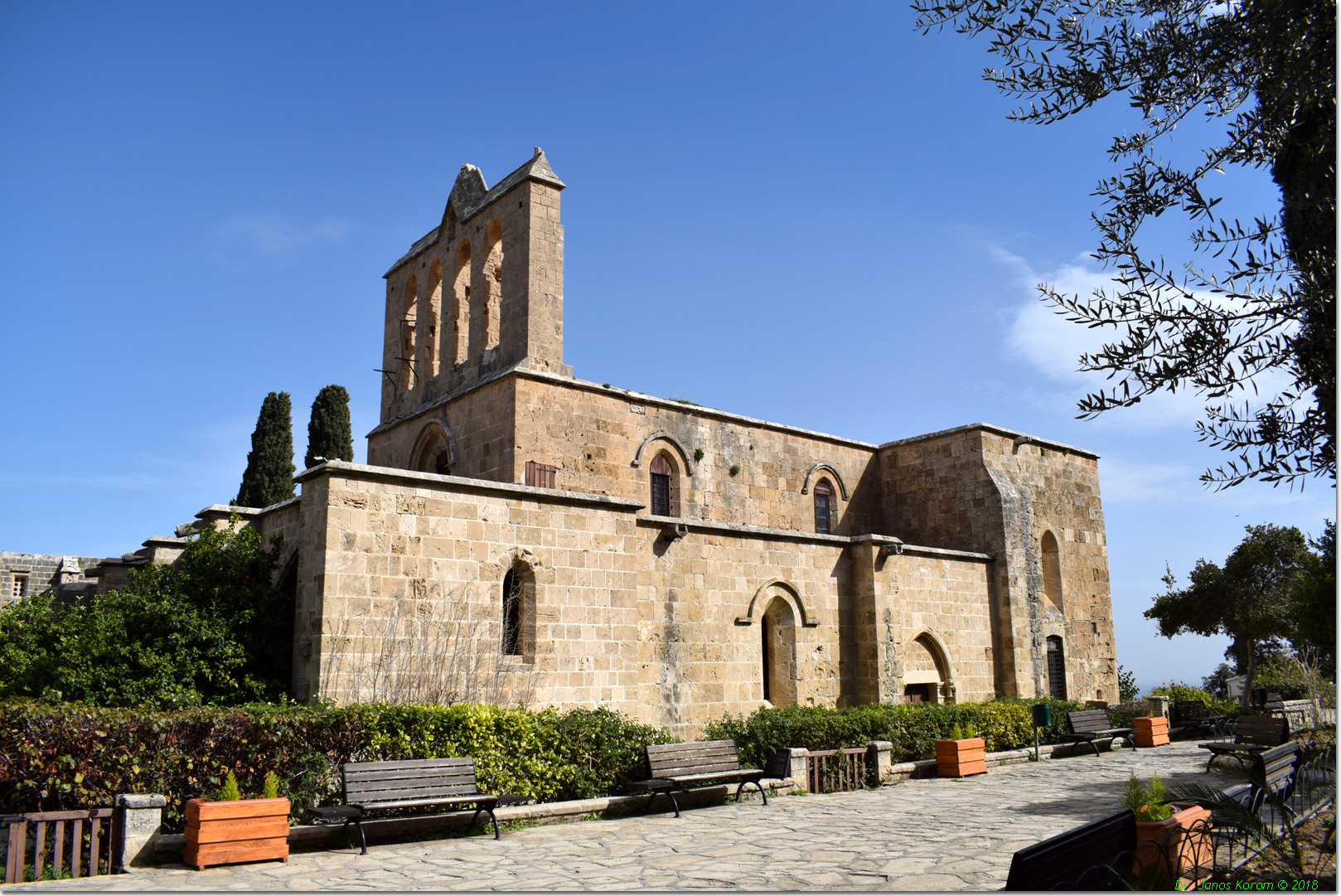
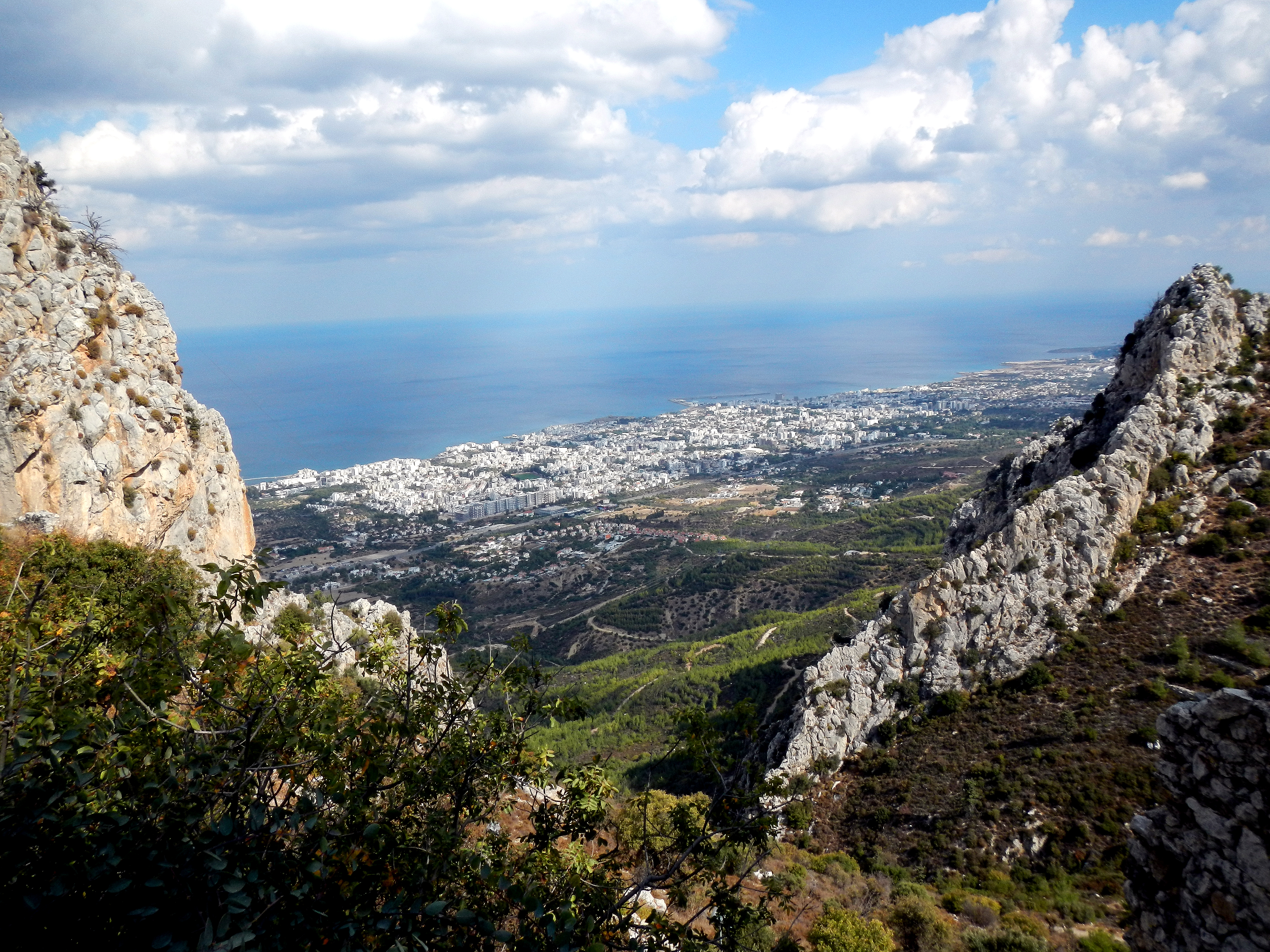
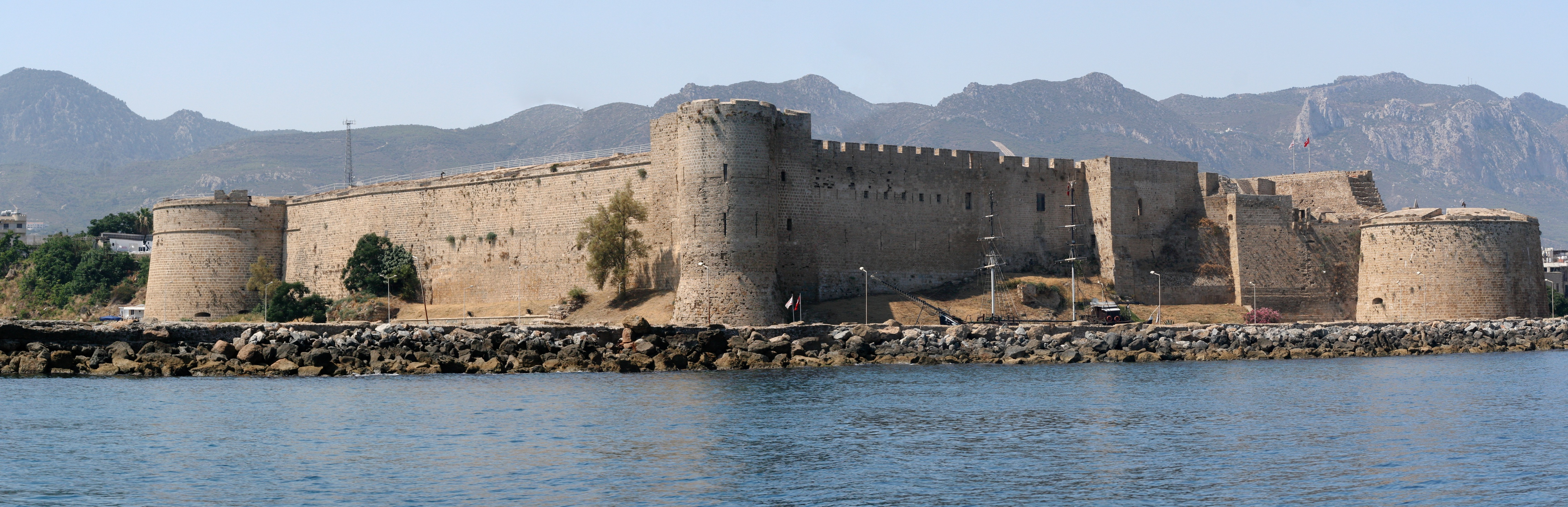
- Kyrenia Harbour Kyrenia Castle exterior View of Kyrenia from Bellapais Monastery Bellapais Monastery View of Kyrenia from St. Hilarion Castle Kyrenia Castle
- Interactive map of Kyrenia
- Location within Cyprus Location within the Eastern Mediterranean Location within Asia
- Coordinates: 35°20′25″N 33°19′09″E
- Country (de jure): Cyprus
  - District: Kyrenia District
- Country (de facto): Northern Cyprus
  - District: Girne District

Government
  - Mayor: Murat Şenkul (in Kyrenia); Violaris Iosif (in exile)

Area
  - Kyrenia: 10.47 km^{2} (4.04 sq mi)
  - Municipality: 52.59 km^{2} (20.31 sq mi)
  - District: 690 km^{2} (270 sq mi)
- Elevation: 0 m (0 ft)

Population (2019 projection)
  - Kyrenia: 22,148
  - Municipality: 45,881
  - Municipality density: 872.4/km^{2} (2,260/sq mi)
  - District: 96,663
- Time zone: UTC+2 (EET)
  - Summer (DST): UTC+3 (EEST)
- Website: Kyrenia Turkish Municipality; Northern Cyprus eGov portal Kyrenia Municipality(in exile)

Kyrenia (Note: Greek: Κερύνεια, romanized: Kerýneia locally [t͡ʃeˈɾiɲˑa]; Turkish: Girne [ˈɟiɾne]) is a city on the northern coast of Cyprus, noted for its historic harbour and castle. It is under the control of Northern Cyprus.

According to mythical tradition, Kyrenia was founded by the legendary Achaeans Cepheus and Praxandrus after the Trojan War of Homeric epic. In this traditional origin myth, the Achaeans named the new city after their hometown Kyrenia in Achaea, Greece.

As the town grew prosperous, the Romans established the foundations of its castle in the 1st century AD. Kyrenia grew in importance after the 9th century due to the safety offered by the castle, and played a pivotal role under Lusignan rule as the city never capitulated. The castle was most recently modified by the Venetians in the 15th century. The city surrendered to the Ottoman Empire in 1571.

The city's population was almost equally divided between Muslims and Christians in 1831, with a slight Muslim majority. However, with the advent of British rule, many Turkish Cypriots fled to Anatolia, and the town came to be predominantly inhabited by Greek Cypriots. While the city suffered little intercommunal violence, its Greek Cypriot inhabitants, numbering around 2,650, fled or were forcefully displaced in the wake of the Turkish invasion in 1974. Currently, the city is populated by Turkish Cypriots, mainland Turkish settlers, and British expats, with a municipal population of 33,207.

Kyrenia is a cultural and economical centre, described as the tourism capital of Northern Cyprus. It is home to numerous hotels, nightlife and a port. It hosts an annual culture and arts festival with hundreds of participating artists and performers and is home to three universities with a student population around 14,000.

== History ==
=== Ancient times ===
The earliest document which mention Kyrenia is the Periplus of Pseudo Skylax. It dates to the thirteenth century but is based on fourth-century BC knowledge. The manuscript names numerous towns along the Mediterranean coast and mentions Kyrenia as a harbour town: "Opposite Cilicia is the island of Cyprus, and these are its city-states (poleis): Salamis, which is Greek and has a closed winter harbour; the Karpasia, Kyrenia, Lapithos, which is Phoenician; Soloi (this has also winter harbour); Marion, which is Greek; Amathus (which is autochthonous). All of them have deserted (summer) harbours. And there are also city states speaking strange languages inland." 4 Skylax referred to both Kyrenia and Lapithos as Phoenician towns. Coins with Phoenician legends underline that the Northern coast between Kyrenia and Lapithos were at least under Phoenician influence.

Another topographical source is the Stadiasmus Maris Magni (from the name 'stadion', a unit of distance, 1 stadion = 184 metres (604 ft)). The unknown author, who sailed from Cape Anamur on the Cilician coast to Cyprus and circumnavigated the island, gave the distances from Asia Minor to the nearest point in Cyprus. This was 300 stadia, around 55,000 metres (180,000 ft). He also recorded distances between towns. From Soli to Kyrenia he counted 350 stadia, 50 from Kyrenia to Lapithos and 550 from Lapithos to Karpasia.

Ptolemy's Geography gives the distances between the towns and settlements of Cyprus which are marked by cycles and lists Kyrenia. Ptolemy, lived in Alexandria, Egypt, around 150 AD.

Another medieval reproduction of an ancient scroll is the Tabula Peutingeriana. It is nearly seven metres (23 ft) long and one metre (3.3 ft) wide and shows the road network in the Roman Empire of the 4th/5th century. Kyrenia together with Paphos, Soloi, Tremethousa and Salamis are marked by a pictogram showing two towers close together. Kyrenia is connected by a road via Lapithos and Soli with Paphos and via Chytri with Salamis.

The use of milestones during Roman times, shows that the road circuit around the island was completed. Kyrenia was connected via Soli and Paphos to the western and southern part of the island. At the same time, the road to the east was extended along the shore to Karpasia and Urania on the Karpas Peninsula. During the following centuries, Kyrenia is variously named on the maps as Ceraunia, Cerenis, Keronean, Kernia and Kerini.

Cepheus from Arcadia is believed to be the founder of the town of Kyrenia. A military leader, he arrived at the north coast of Cyprus bringing many settlers with him from various towns in Achaea. One such town, located near present-day Aigio in the Peloponnese, was also called Kyrenia. This is said to be the home of the mythical Ceryneian Hind (Greek: Κερυνῖτις ἔλαφος, romanized: Kerynitis elaphos) from the 12 Labours of Hercules. East of Kyrenia lies the "Coast of Achaeans". According to Strabo, It was at Kyrenia that Teucer came first ashore, to found the ancient Kingdom of Salamis after the Trojan war.

The earliest reference made to the town of Kyrenia is found, together with that of the other seven city-kingdoms of Cyprus, in Egyptian scripts dating from the period of Ramesses III, 1125–1100s BC.

From its early days, Kyrenia's commerce and maritime trade benefited enormously from its proximity to the coast of Asia Minor. Boats set sail from the Aegean islands, traveled along the coast of Asia Minor, then crossed over the short distance to the northern shores of Cyprus to reach the two city-kingdoms of Lapithos and Kyrenia. This lively maritime activity (late 4th or early 3rd century BC) is evident in an ancient shipwreck discovered by Andreas Kariolou in 1965, just outside Kyrenia harbour. The vessel's route along Samos, Kos, Rhodes, the Asia Minor coastline and then Kyrenia, demonstrates the town's close maritime relations with other city-kingdoms in the eastern Mediterranean.

During the succession struggle between Ptolemy and Antigonus that followed Alexander the Great's death in 323 BC, Kyrenia was subdued under the rule of the kingdom of Lapithos that allied itself with the Antigonid dynasty. Diodorus Siculus observes that in 312 BC. Ptolemy arrested Praxipos the king of Lapithos and the king of Kyrenia. Once the Ptolemies were successful in dominating the whole island, all city-kingdoms were abolished. Kyrenia however, because of its maritime trade, continued to prosper. In the 2nd century BC, it is cited as one of six Cypriot towns which were benefactors to the Oracle at Delphi, that is, it received its special representatives who collected contributions and gifts. The town's prosperity at this time is also evident from its two temples, one dedicated to Apollo and the other to Aphrodite, and from the rich archeological finds dating from the Hellenistic period excavated within the present-day town limits.

The Romans succeeded the Ptolemies as rulers of Cyprus and during this time Lapithos became the administrative centre of the district. The numerous tombs excavated and the rich archeological finds dating from this period indicate, however, that Kyrenia continued to be a populous and prosperous town. An inscription found at the base of a limestone statue dating from 13 to 37 AD, refers to 'Kyrenians Demos' that is, the town's inhabitants. Here as elsewhere, the Romans left their mark by constructing a castle with a seawall in front of it so that boats and ships could anchor in safety.

Christianity found fertile ground in the area. Early Christians used the old quarries of Chrysokava, just east of Kyrenia castle, as catacombs and cut-rock cemeteries which are considered among the island's most important specimens of this period. Later, some of these caves were converted into churches and feature iconography, the most representative of which is that found at Ayia Mavri. The latest editions of the Roman Martyrology no longer include a mention, as a martyr, of Bishop Theodotus of this see. The Greek Menologium recounts, under 6 May, that under Licinius he was arrested and tortured, before being released when the Edict of Milan of 313, of which Licinius was co-author, mandated toleration of Christians in the Roman Empire.

=== Middle ages ===
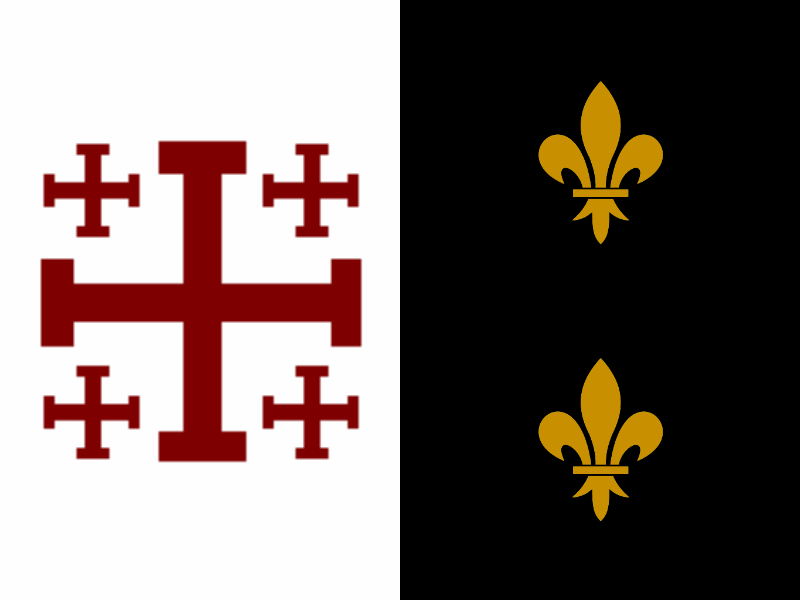
XIII century flag of the Lusignan family, Kyrenia castle

With the division of the Roman Empire into an eastern and a western empire, in 395, Cyprus came under the Byzantine emperors and the Greek Orthodox Church. The Byzantine emperors fortified Kyrenia's Roman castle and in the 10th century, they constructed in its vicinity a church dedicated to Saint George, which the garrison used as a chapel. Then, when in 806, Lambousa was destroyed in the Arab raids, Kyrenia grew in importance as its castle and garrison offered its inhabitants protection and security. Isaac Komnenos of Cyprus, the island's last Byzantine governor, sent his family and treasures to the castle for safety in 1191 when King Richard I of England went to war with him and became the island's new ruler.

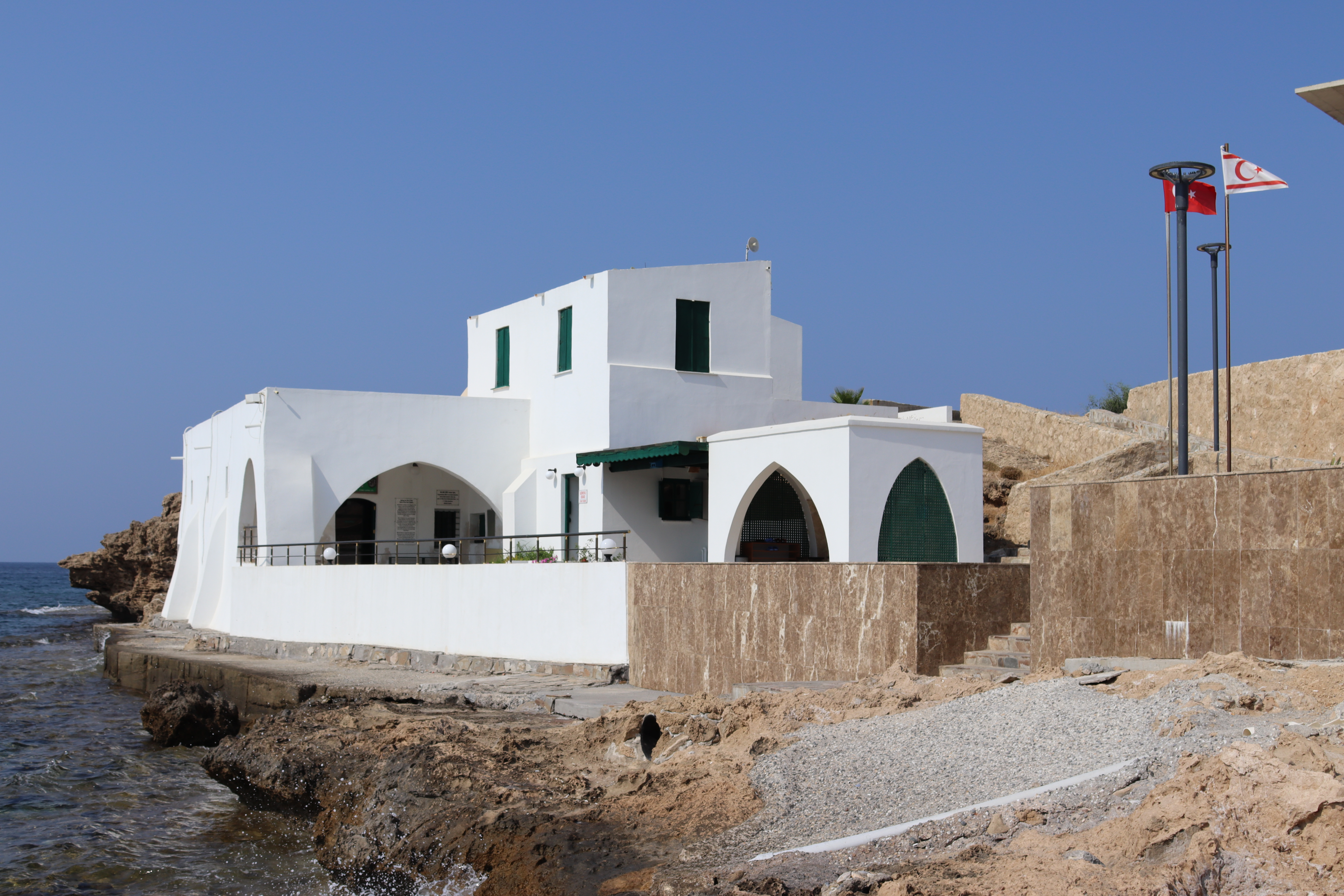
The Tomb of Hazreti Ömer, located near Çatalköy, dates back to early Islam and is an important pilgrimage site for Muslims.

Richard's rule was not welcomed in Cyprus so he sold the island first to the Knights Templar, and then in 1192, to Guy of Lusignan. Under Frankish rule, the villages of the district of Kyrenia became feudal estates and the town once again became the administrative and commercial centre of its region. The Lusignans enlarged the castle, built a wall and towers around the town, and extended the fortifications to the harbour. They also fortified the Byzantine castles of Saint Hilarion, Buffavento and Kantara, which, together with Kyrenia Castle, protected the town from land and sea attacks. Kyrenia castle played a pivotal role in the island's history during the many disputes among the Frankish kings, as well as the conflicts with the Genoese.

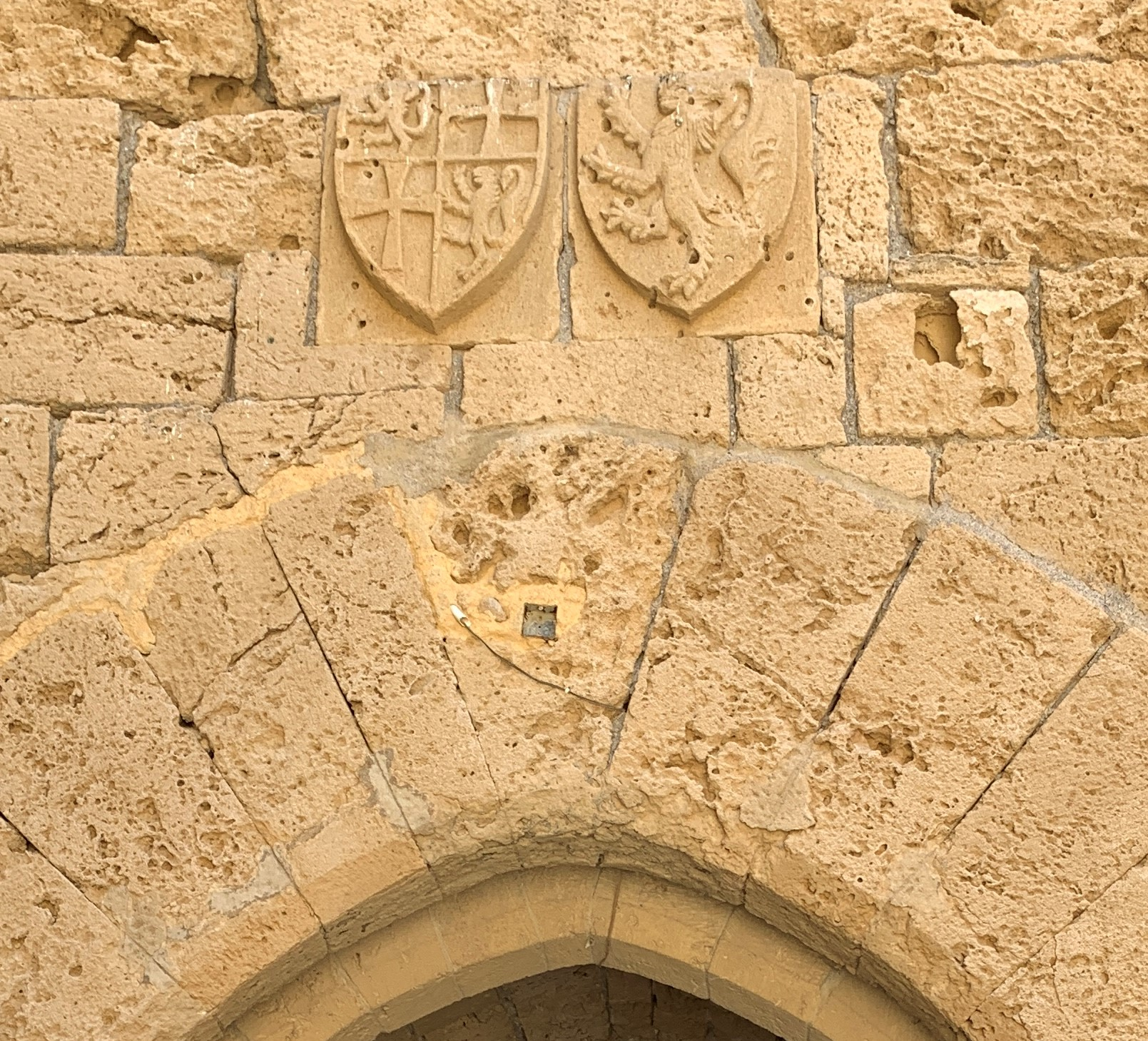
Lusignan coat of arms detail crests above the gateway to Kyrenia Castle

In 1229, during the civil war in Cyprus, the forces of King Henry I of Cyprus and the Ibelins took the castle of Kyrenia from the supporters of Frederick II with the support of Genoese ships.

In 1489, Cyprus came under Venetian rule. The Venetians modified Kyrenia Castle to meet the threat that gunpowder and cannons posed. The castle's royal quarters and three of its four thin Frankish towers were demolished and replaced by thickset circular towers that could better withstand cannon fire.

In 1505, a plague that was thought to have originated in Anatolia killed a quarter of the town's population. Another plague that originated in the Levant and affected parts of the island struck the town in 1523.

The castle's towers were never put to the test. In 1571, the castle and the town surrendered to the Ottoman army.

=== Ottoman rule ===
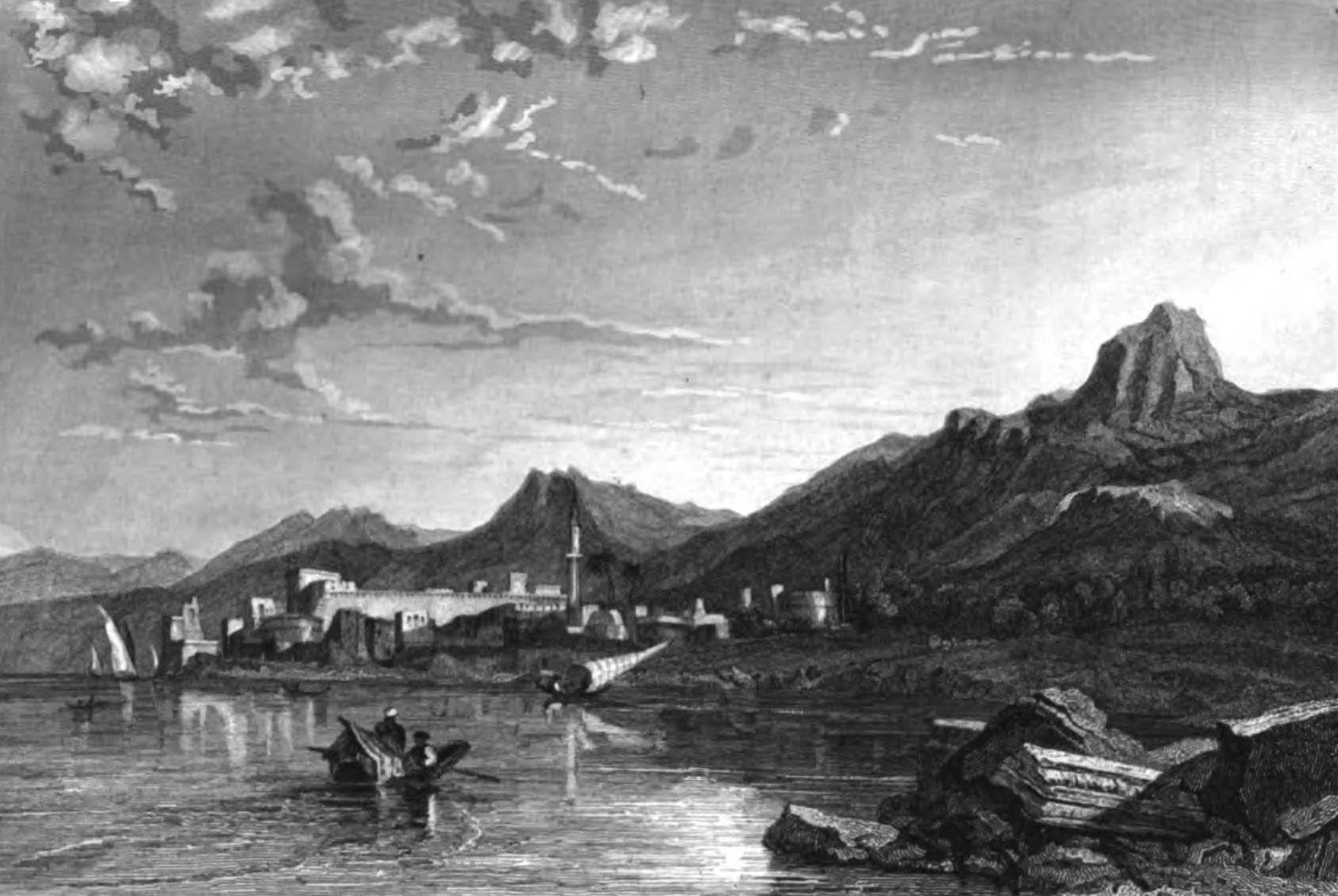
An illustration of Kyrenia in 1837

Under Ottoman rule, Kyrenia district was at first one of four, then one of six, administrative districts of the island and remained its administrative capital. The town's fortunes declined however, as it was transformed into a garrison town. The Christian population was expelled from the fortified city, and no one was allowed to reside within the castle other than the artillerymen and their families. These men coerced the town's inhabitants and those of the surrounding villages, Christian and Muslim alike, with their arbitrary looting and crimes. The few local inhabitants who dared to stay were merchants and fishermen whose livelihood depended on the sea. They built their homes outside the city wall, which through time, neglect and disrepair, turned to ruin. The rest of the inhabitants moved further out to the area known as Pano Kyrenia or the 'Riatiko' (so called because it once belonged to a king) or fled further inland and to the mountain villages of Thermeia, Karakoumi, Kazafani, Bellapais and Karmi.

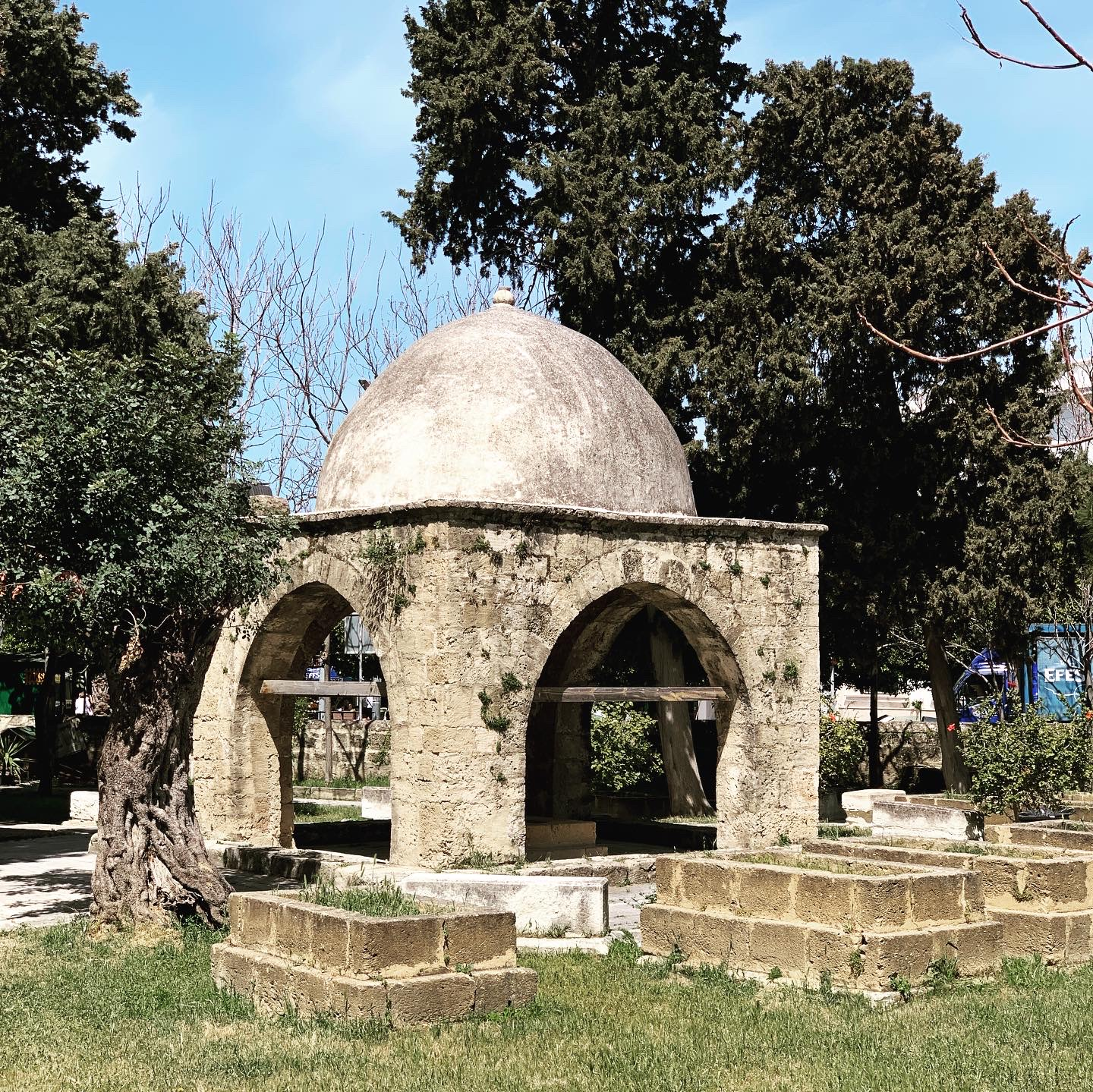
Ottoman cemetery, dome and graves

The town revived again when bribes and gifts paid to local Turkish officials caused them to allow local maritime trade with Asia Minor and the Aegean islands to resume. In 1783, the church of Chrysopolitissa was renovated. Then, following the Ottoman Reform Edict of 1856, which introduced social and political reform and greater religious freedom for the various peoples of the Ottoman Empire, the church of Archangel Michael was rebuilt on a rocky mount overlooking the sea. Around this time, many of the Christian inhabitants of the surrounding villages re-established themselves in the town. Local agriculture and maritime trade, particularly the export of carobs to Asia Minor, allowed the people of Kyrenia to live comfortably, and some even educated their children and pursued other cultural activities.

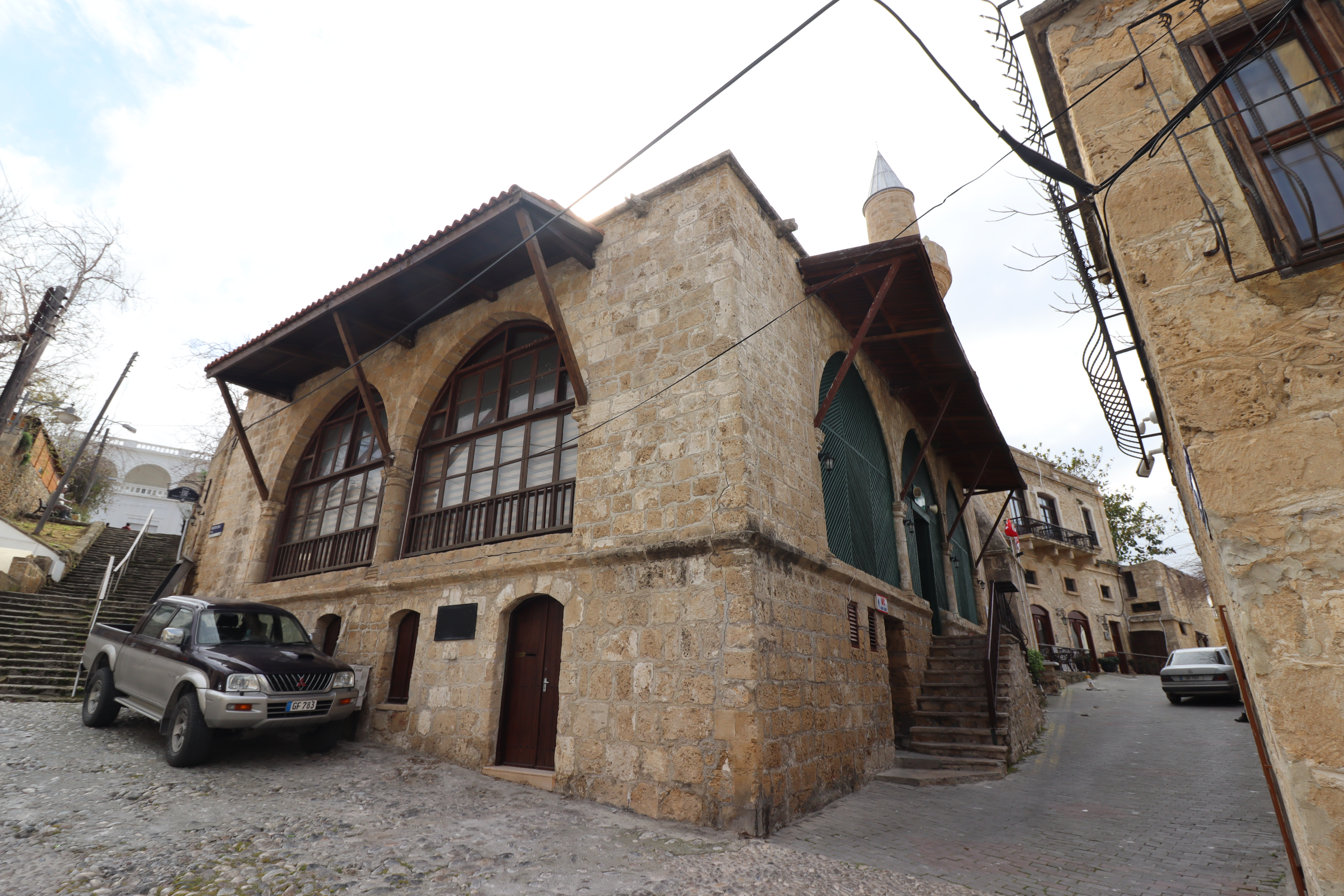
Ağa Cafer Pasha Mosque is a historical Ottoman-era mosque located in the center of Kyrenia.

According to the 1831 census, which counted only male inhabitants, Muslims made up 52% of the population. By 1881, three years into the British administration of the island, Muslims and Christians in the town were still almost equal in numbers; the census for 1881 records the town's population as 570 Muslims and 594 Christians. However, a significant Muslim emigration from the town to Anatolia took place between 1881 and 1931, reducing the Muslim population ratio to only 36% in 1901, 32.5% in 1911, 30% in 1921, and 24% in 1931. One explanation for this exodus may be the general anxiety that prevailed among the island's Muslim population during the Balkan and First World wars, when the Ottomans fought against Greece in the former and Britain in the latter. Proclamation of the island as a British colony in 1924 caused further Turkish Cypriot emigration to Anatolia, symptomatic of the weak bond the Cypriot Turkish population had with the town. The Turkish Cypriot population proportion continued to decrease until 1960 when it reached 20%.

=== British rule ===
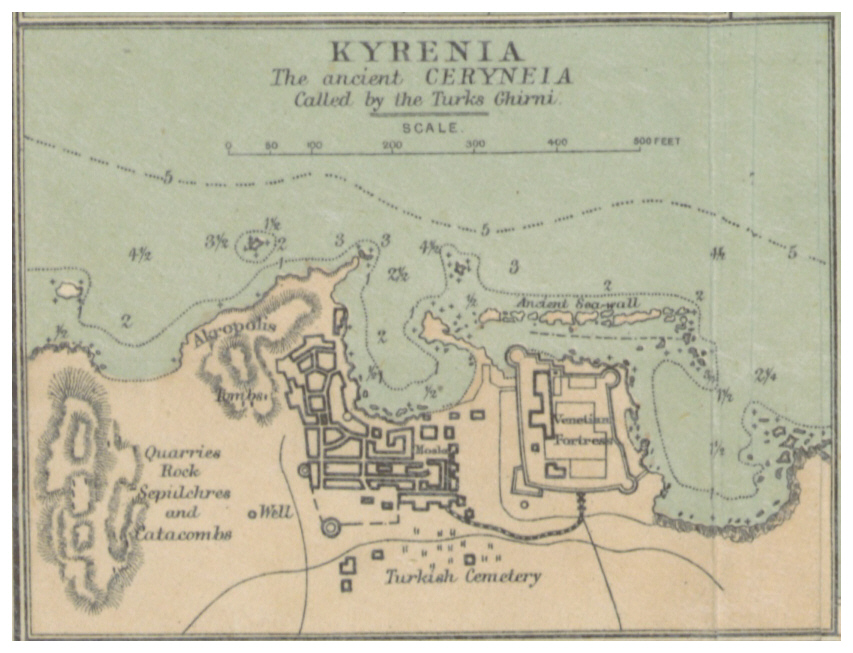
Map of Kyrenia in 1878

In 1878, following a secret agreement between the British and Ottoman governments, Cyprus was ceded to Great Britain as a military base in the eastern Mediterranean. At first Great Britain did not undertake major administrative changes, so Kyrenia remained the district's capital. A road was constructed through the mountain pass to connect the town to Nicosia, the island's capital, and the harbour was repaired and expanded to accommodate increasing trade with the opposite coast. The town's municipal affairs were put in order and the municipal council took an active role in cleaning and modernizing the town.

In 1893, a hospital was built through private contributions and effort. By the 1900s (decade), Kyrenia was a buzzing little town with a new school building, its own newspaper, and social, educational, and athletic clubs. It was also a favoured vacation spot for many wealthy Nicosian families. Many homes were converted into pensions and boardinghouses and in 1906, the first hotel, Akteon, was built by the sea.

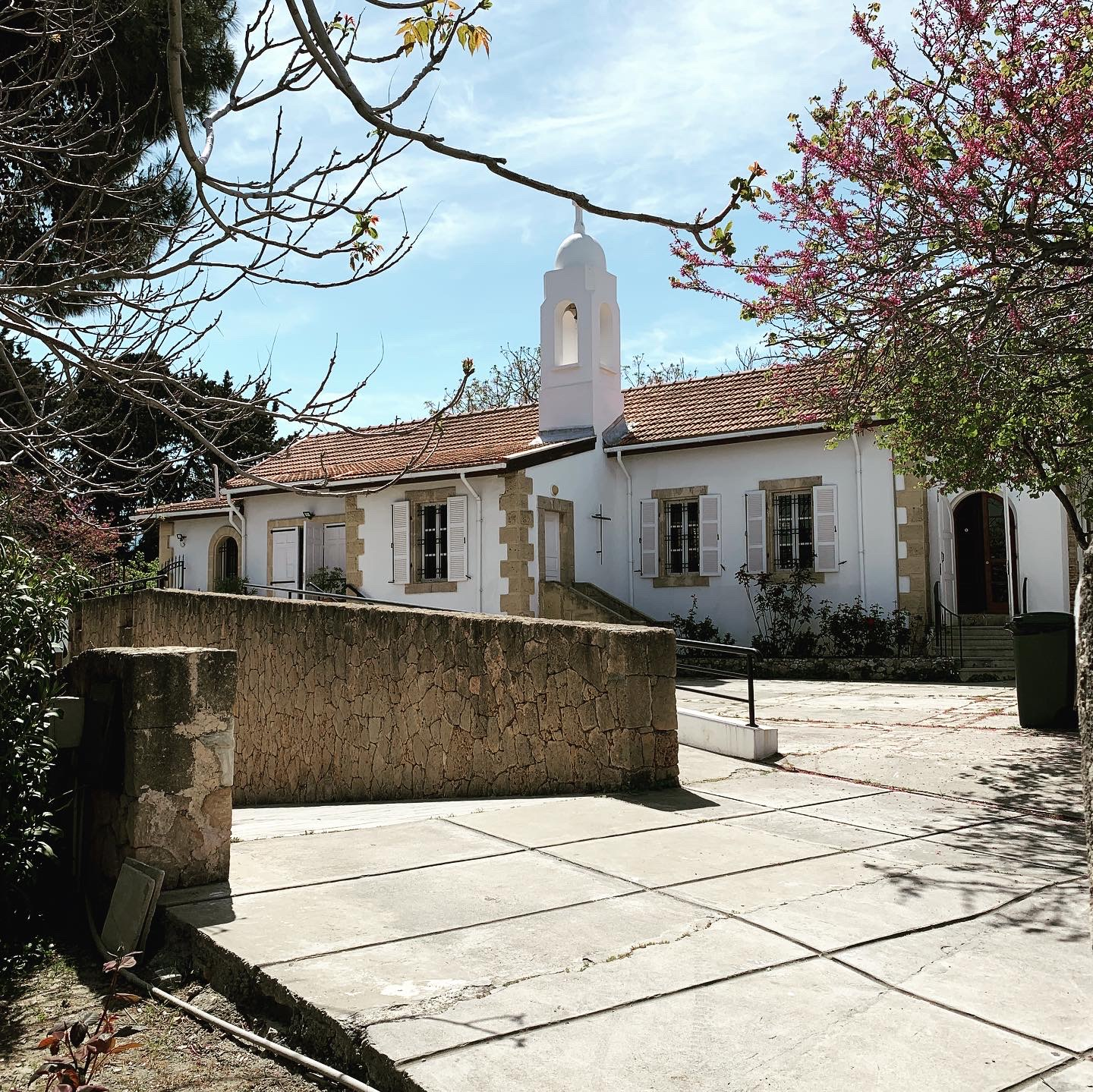
St Andrew's Church is part of the Anglican church's Diocese of Cyprus and the Gulf.

These first decades of British rule however, also saw increased economic hardship for the population. High taxation, frequent droughts, and a worldwide economic depression were precipitating factors for a mass exodus of people from the town and district, first to Egypt and then to the United States. The transfer of the island to British rule also prompted anxiety in the Turkish Cypriot population, whose numbers stagnated as a significant emigration to Anatolia took place. Meanwhile, the ratio of the Greek Cypriots grew significantly from 49% to 67%.

In 1922, the Episcopal see of Kyrenia relocated back to the town after the completion of a new metropolitan building. That same year, the Greco-Turkish War brought to a halt all trade with the opposite coast causing a serious economic depression.

Costas Catsellis, a young repatriate from the United States, built the town's first modern hotels, the Seaview in 1922 and the Dome in 1932. Kyrenia's mild climate, picturesque harbour, numerous archeological sites, panoramic views that combined sea, mountains and vegetation, coupled with modern amenities, soon attracted many travellers and Kyrenia's economy revived through tourism.

After the Second World War, more hotels were built and the town remained a favoured vacation spot for people from Nicosia and foreign travellers alike. To the town's Greek and Turkish inhabitants were added many from Great Britain, who chose Kyrenia as their permanent place of residence.

=== 1960–present ===
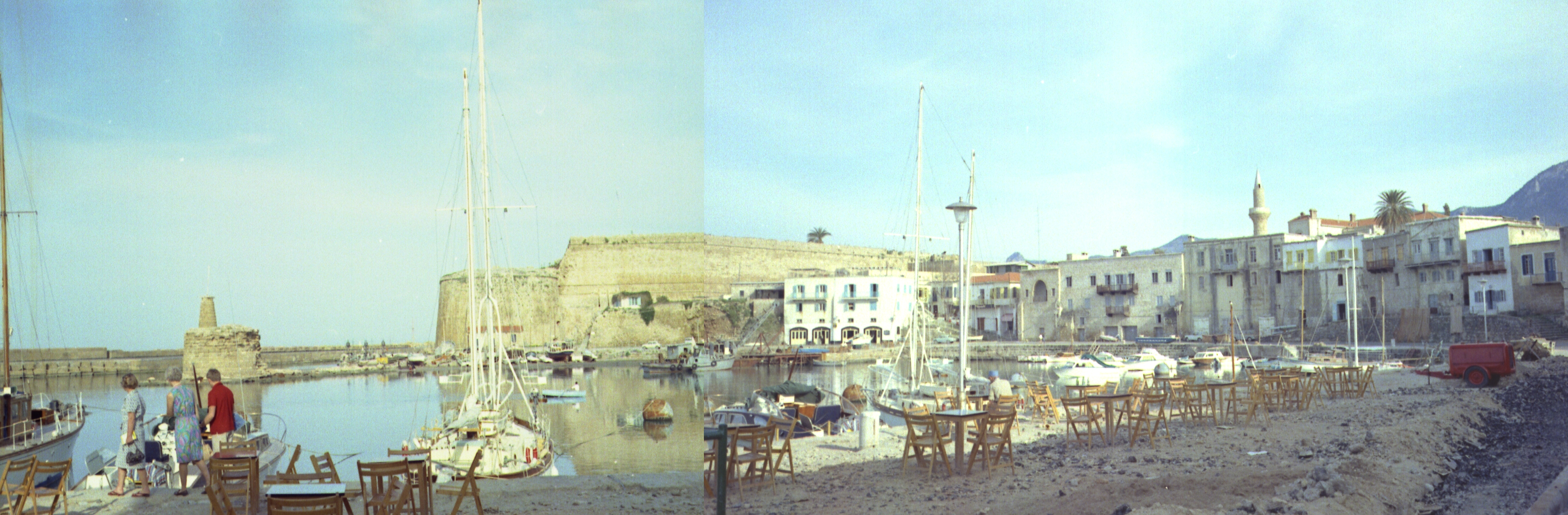
Kyrenia Harbour in 1967

In 1960, Cyprus gained its independence from Great Britain. However, the intercommunal conflict that broke out in 1963–1964 between the island's Greek and Turkish population again eroded Kyrenia's prosperity. While skirmishes in Kyrenia were minimal, the Turkish Resistance Organisation blockaded the Kyrenia-Nicosia road and occupied Saint Hilarion castle.

Despite these difficulties, the 1960s and early 1970s was a period of lively cultural and economic activity. A new town hall was built and a Folklore Museum established. The ancient shipwreck was reassembled, together with all its amphorae and cargo, and permanently exhibited at the castle. The number of new hotels and tourists multiplied and a new road was constructed in the early 1970s connecting the town to Nicosia from the east. The town's cultural activities greatly increased. Other than the many traditional cultural and religious fairs and festivals annually celebrated, flower shows, yachting races, concerts and theater performances were organized.

According to the 1973 census, 67.7% of the city's inhabitants were Greek Cypriots, while the Turkish Cypriots made up 25.1% of the population. The town's inhabitants, Greek, Turk, Maronite, Armenian, Latin and British peacefully coexisted and cooperated in their daily affairs and the town had grown beyond its two historic neighbourhoods of Kato (Lower) Kyrenia and Pano (Upper) Kyrenia. It expanded towards the mountain slopes to form the new neighbourhood of "California", and eastward it had just about reached the outskirts of Thermia, Karakoumi and Ayios Georgios.

On 20 July 1974, the Turkish army invaded Cyprus in response to a coup d'état carried out by EOKA B and the Greek junta, landing at 5-Mile point, west of Kyrenia. Gaining ground against the local forces, the Turkish Army reached Kyrenia on 22 July 1974 during the UN-sponsored cease fire. The majority of the Greek Cypriot population of the city fled in the wake of the Turkish advance. A small group of Greek Cypriots who tried to remain within Kyrenia were kept in the Dome Hotel until October 1975, after which they were taken to Bellapais; the total number of the displaced Kyrenian Greek Cypriots were around 2,650. Subsequently, Turkish Cypriots displaced from elsewhere in Cyprus and immigrants from Turkey moved in, with the result that the town's present ethnic make-up is predominantly Turkish and Turkish-Cypriot.

== Cityscape ==
=== Harbour ===
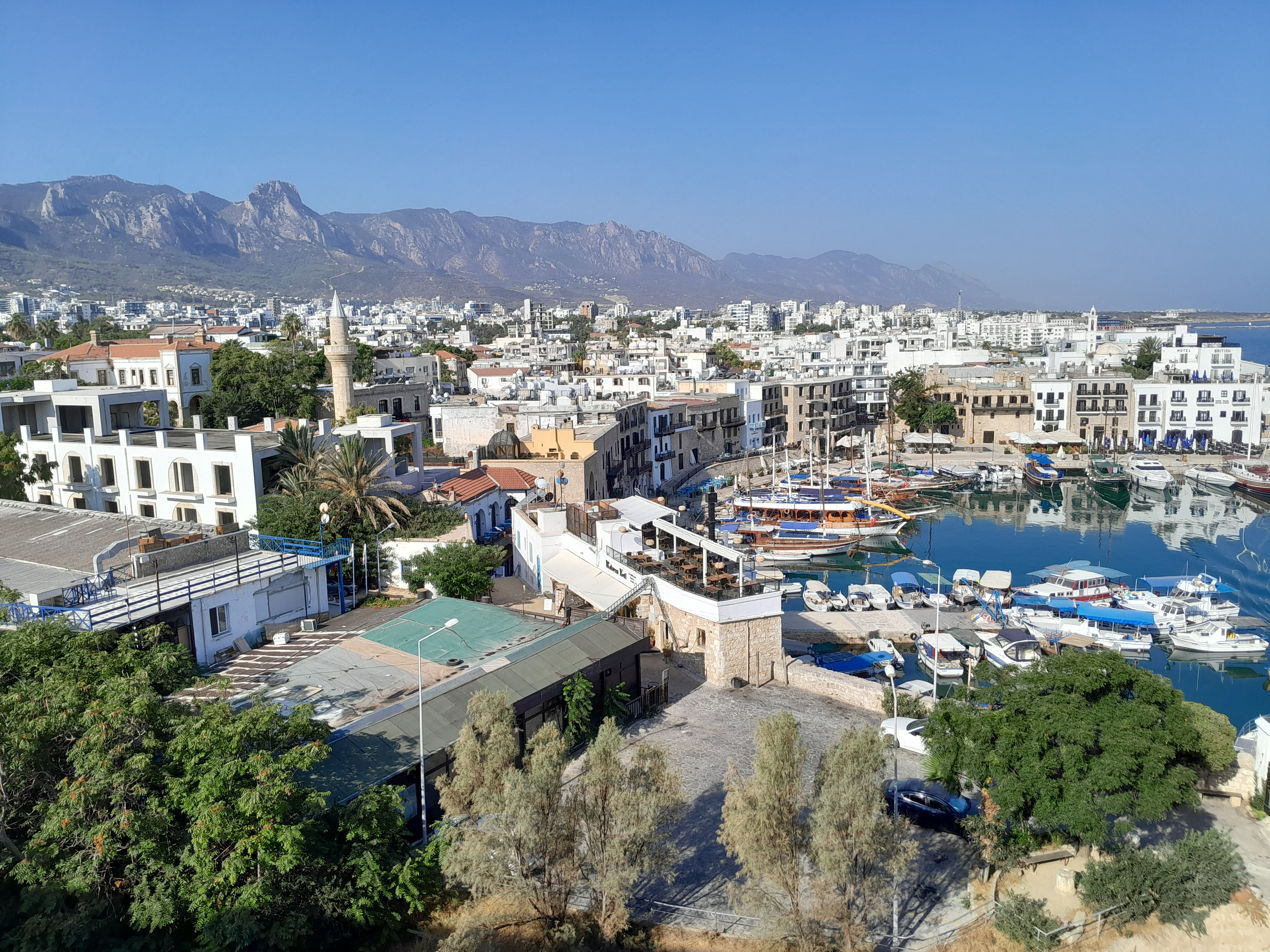
Panoramic view of Old Harbour, from Kyrenia Castle

Just before the British took control of Cyprus in 1878, Kyrenia harbour was a quiet, often ignored, port between Cyprus and Europe and the Middle East. From there local caïques, Cypriot owned – Greek and Turkish – and Greek owned, conducted a thriving trade. Depending on the season, they exported wheat and olives, donkeys and goats and much more. Larger boats, mostly from Europe, arrived in the late fall and early winter to take in the crop of carobs, the main export of the area. The caiques brought in wood, earthenware, legumes, cheese, butter, and small luxuries items, such as silk and cotton cloth, buttons and odd pieces of furniture. Slowly, two storied buildings emerged around the harbour as the owners used the lower floor as warehouses and the second floor as their residences.

The town's trade with the Anatolian coast and beyond the Levant sea was badly affected when in 1885, the British government of the island began the Kyrenia harbour works that left the harbor wide open to the northern gales. Slowly, over the next decades, scores of caiques were wrecked within Kyrenia harbour, with their owners often unable to recover from the loss.

Kyrenia harbour is currently a tourist location.

As of December 2022, a restoration of the harbour had begun and was expected to be complete by June 2023.

=== Architecture ===
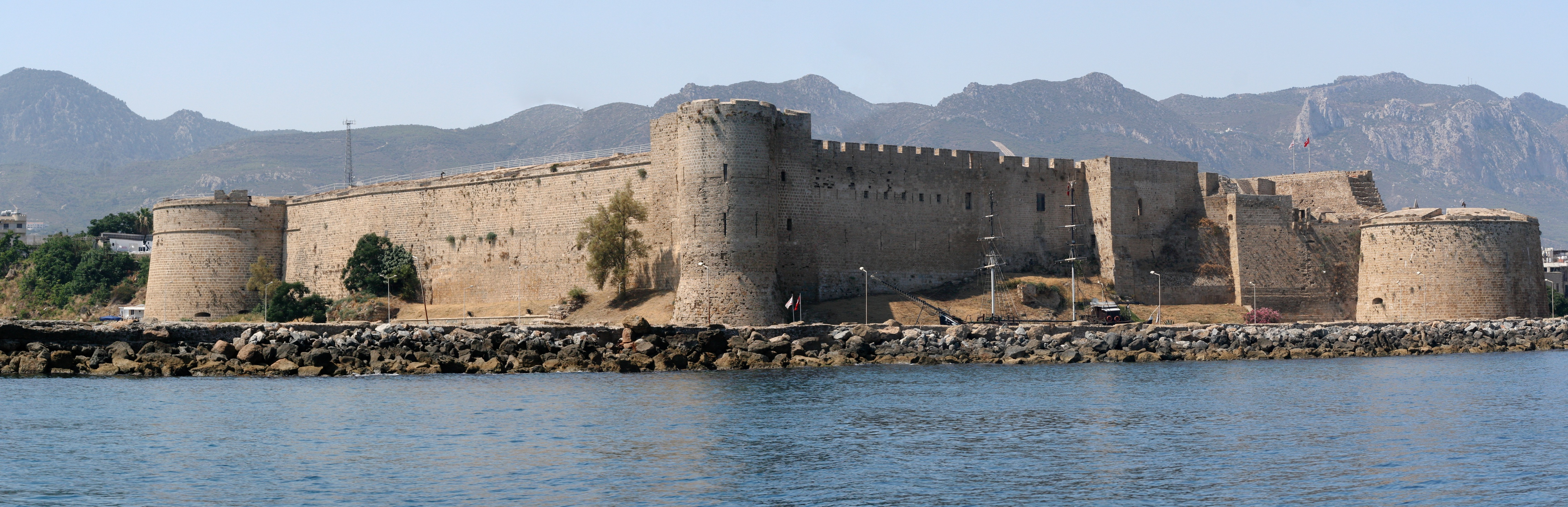
Panorama of Kyrenia Castle (Girne Kalesi)

Kyrenia Castle at the east end of the old harbour dates back to Byzantine times and has served the Byzantines, Crusaders, Venetians, Ottomans, and British. Within its walls is a 12th-century chapel containing reused late Roman capitols, and a shipwreck museum. Huge round towers that the Venetians built in 1540 occupy the corners. These strengthened the castle against the artillery of the time.

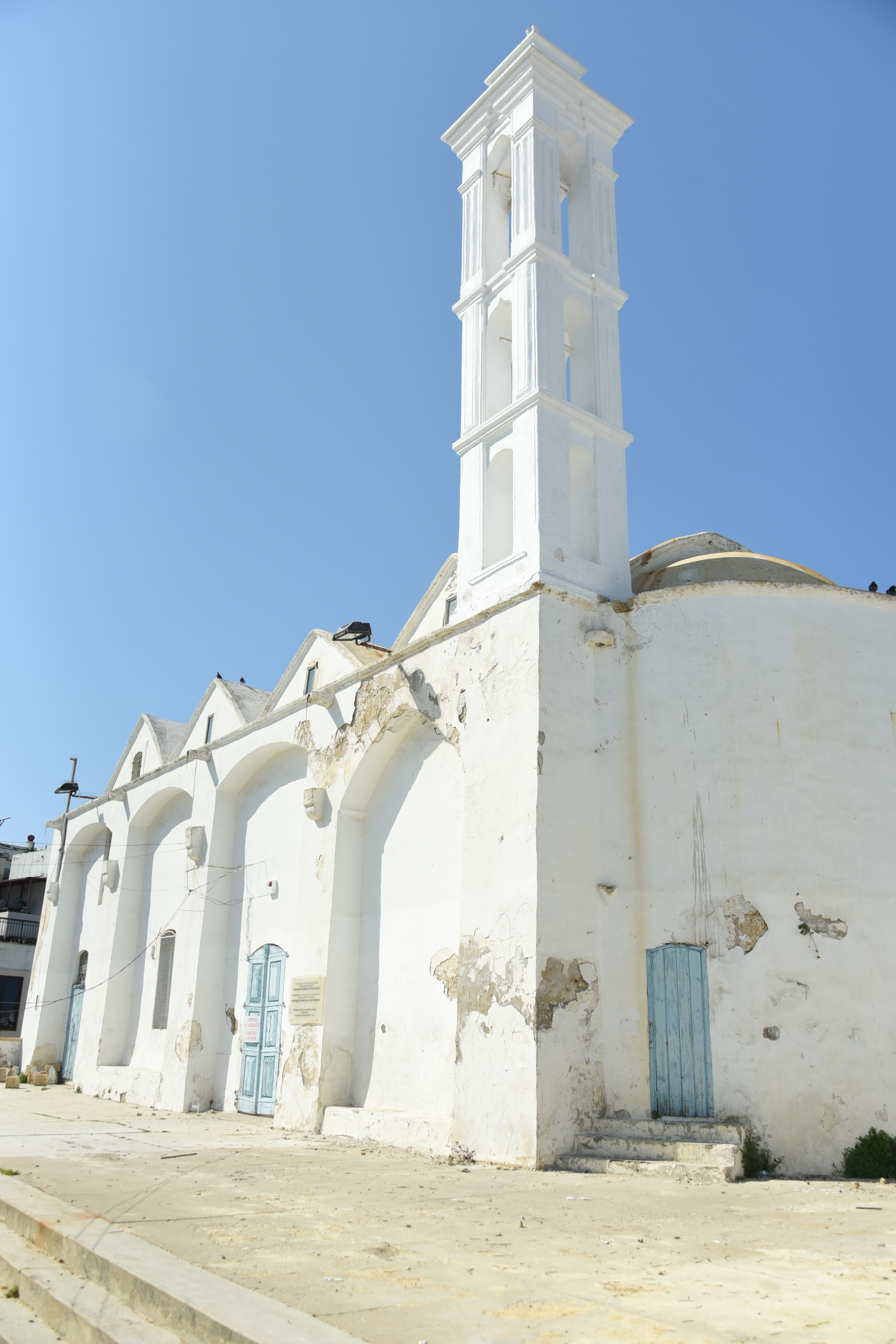
Archangelos Church and Icon Museum

The town has an icon museum housed in a church that had been dedicated to the Archangel Michael. Not far from it there are some tombs cut into the rock dating from about the 4th century. Behind the harbour are the ruins of a small Christian church, and in the harbour is a small tower from which a defensive chain could be slung to close the harbour to any enemies. The Anglican Church of St. Andrews is behind the castle, close to the bus station, and is open all year round.

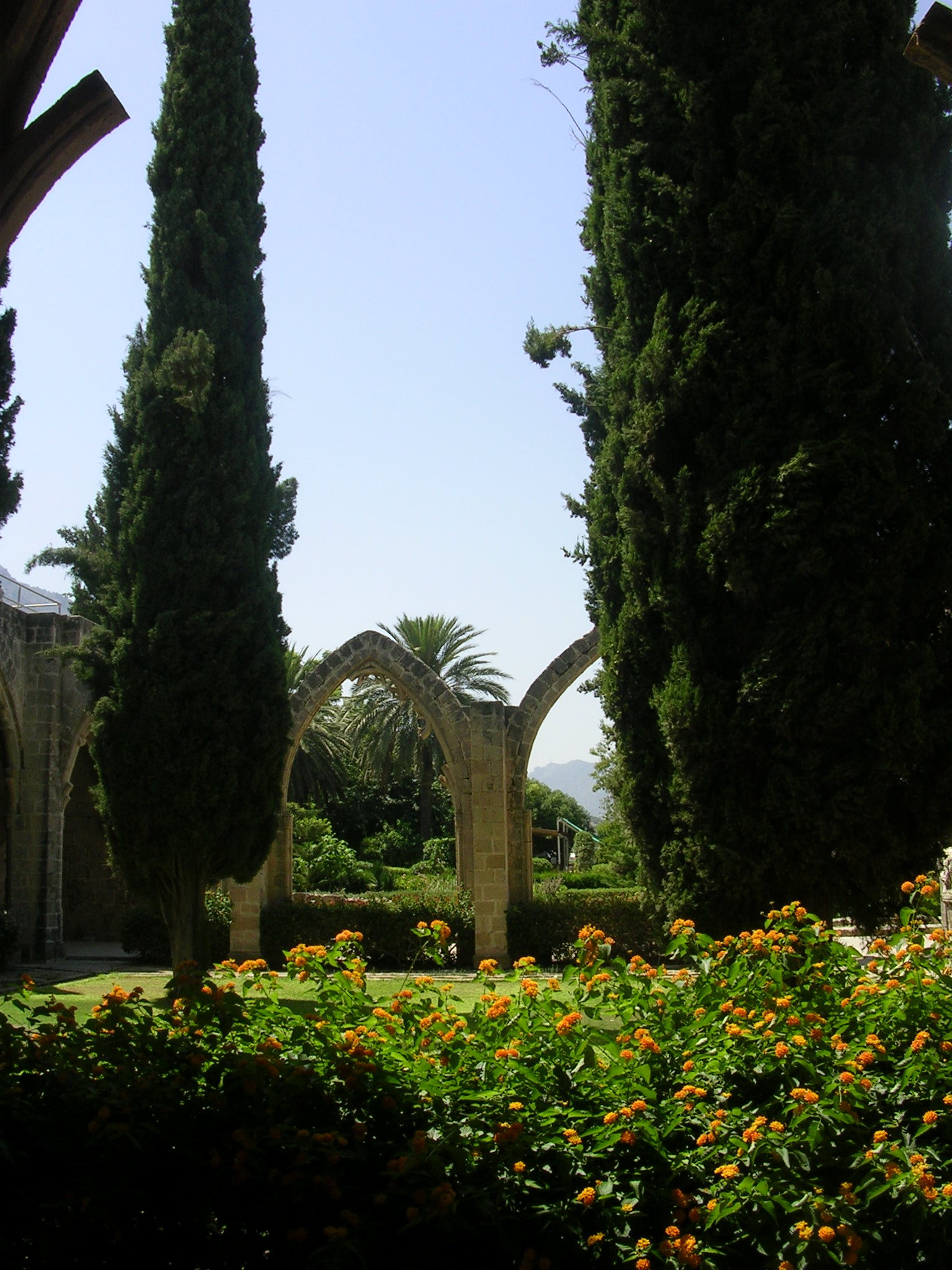
Bellapais Abbey inner court

An example of Ottoman architecture in the city centre is the Agha Cafer Pasha Mosque, built in 1589–1590. The city is also home to four 19th-century fountains and an Ottoman-era cemetery where soldiers serving at the castle and victims of contagious diseases are rumoured to have been interred.

Bellapais Abbey, in the northern village of Bellapais, was constructed between 1198 and 1205. The main building as it can be seen today was built during the 13th century by French Augustinian monks, and specifically during the rule of King Hugh III (1267–1284). The pavilions around the courtyard and the refectory were constructed during the rule of King Hugh IV between 1324 and 1359. The ancient Greek Orthodox Church of Mother Mary Robed in White is also present.

Outside the town, on the Kyrenia mountain range, are Buffavento Castle, Saint Hilarion Castle and Kantara Castle, all of which are thought to have been constructed by the Byzantines following the Arab raids on the island. During Lusignan rule, Buffavento Castle was a prison and called 'Château du Lion'. There the Byzantine ruler of the island, Isaac Komnenos, is said to have fled after Richard I of England conquered Cyprus in 1191. The mountaintop castle of Saint Hilarion dominates Kyrenia and is visible for many miles along the coast. Historical records show that the castle was originally a monastery, founded c. 800 when a monk by the name of Hilarion chose the site for his hermitage. Later, perhaps in 1100, the monastery was converted into a castle. The easternmost of the three castles is Kantara Castle. Sources first mention the castle in 1191, when Richard I captured the island.

== Climate ==
Kyrenia has a hot-summer Mediterranean climate (Köppen climate classification Csa) with long, dry and hot summers and cool winters with mixed weather of sunny spells and rain. Kyrenia is among the wettest places in coastal Cyprus.

Climate data for Kyrenia
Month	Jan	Feb	Mar	Apr	May	Jun	Jul	Aug	Sep	Oct	Nov	Dec	Year
Mean daily maximum °C (°F)	16 (61)	17 (63)	19 (66)	22 (72)	26 (79)	30 (86)	33 (91)	33 (91)	31 (88)	27 (81)	23 (73)	18 (64)	25 (76)
Mean daily minimum °C (°F)	9 (48)	9 (48)	10 (50)	12 (54)	16 (61)	20 (68)	22 (72)	23 (73)	21 (70)	17 (63)	14 (57)	11 (52)	15 (60)
Average precipitation mm (inches)	117 (4.6)	79 (3.1)	60 (2.4)	20 (0.8)	13 (0.5)	2 (0.1)	0 (0)	0 (0)	5 (0.2)	37 (1.5)	68 (2.7)	133 (5.2)	534 (21.1)
Average rainy days	13	10	7	4	2	0	0	0	1	3	7	11	58
Mean monthly sunshine hours	179.8	173.6	220.1	252	316.2	360	375.1	365.8	300	251.1	186	155	3,134.7
Source 1: BBC Weather
Source 2: K.K.T.C

== Economy ==
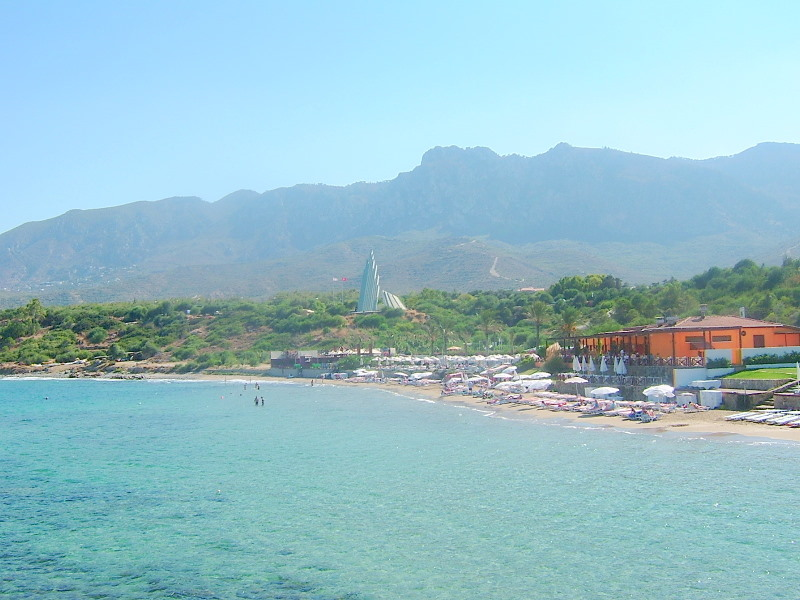
One of the many seaside facilities around Kyrenia

Kyrenia is the centre of tourism in Northern Cyprus and one of the most important cities of Cyprus in terms of tourism. It hosts numerous shopping areas and malls, restaurants and a vibrant nightlife with a number of entertainment facilities. The harbour, in particular, is lined with cafés, bars and restaurants frequented by locals and tourists. In 2009, it had 93 hotels, nine of which had five stars.

In early 2000s, the city and the surrounding area saw a construction boom due to the positive mood created by the Annan Plan. Between 2001 and 2003, construction cases per year increased by more than three times and the city saw a large amount of property being sold to foreigners. The construction boom resulted in the building of numerous housing estates and apartment buildings. The city continued to receive heavy investment throughout the decade and is still a centre of investment. However, the recession that struck Northern Cyprus at the end of the 2000s and the beginning of the 2010s affected the city and caused great difficulty for the small-scale entrepreneurs and shop owners to maintain their businesses. An important part of the economy consists of tourists that come to visit casinos, but this does not necessarily provide benefits for local businesses.

In addition to its historical harbour, Kyrenia is home to a port named the Kyrenia Touristic Port, opened in 1987. This port is a major transport hub in Northern Cyprus due to its relative proximity to Turkey and is home to commercial activity, while being a place of entry for tourists who choose to travel by ferry. It has contributed to the flow of commercial products and tourists between Turkey and Northern Cyprus.

== Culture ==
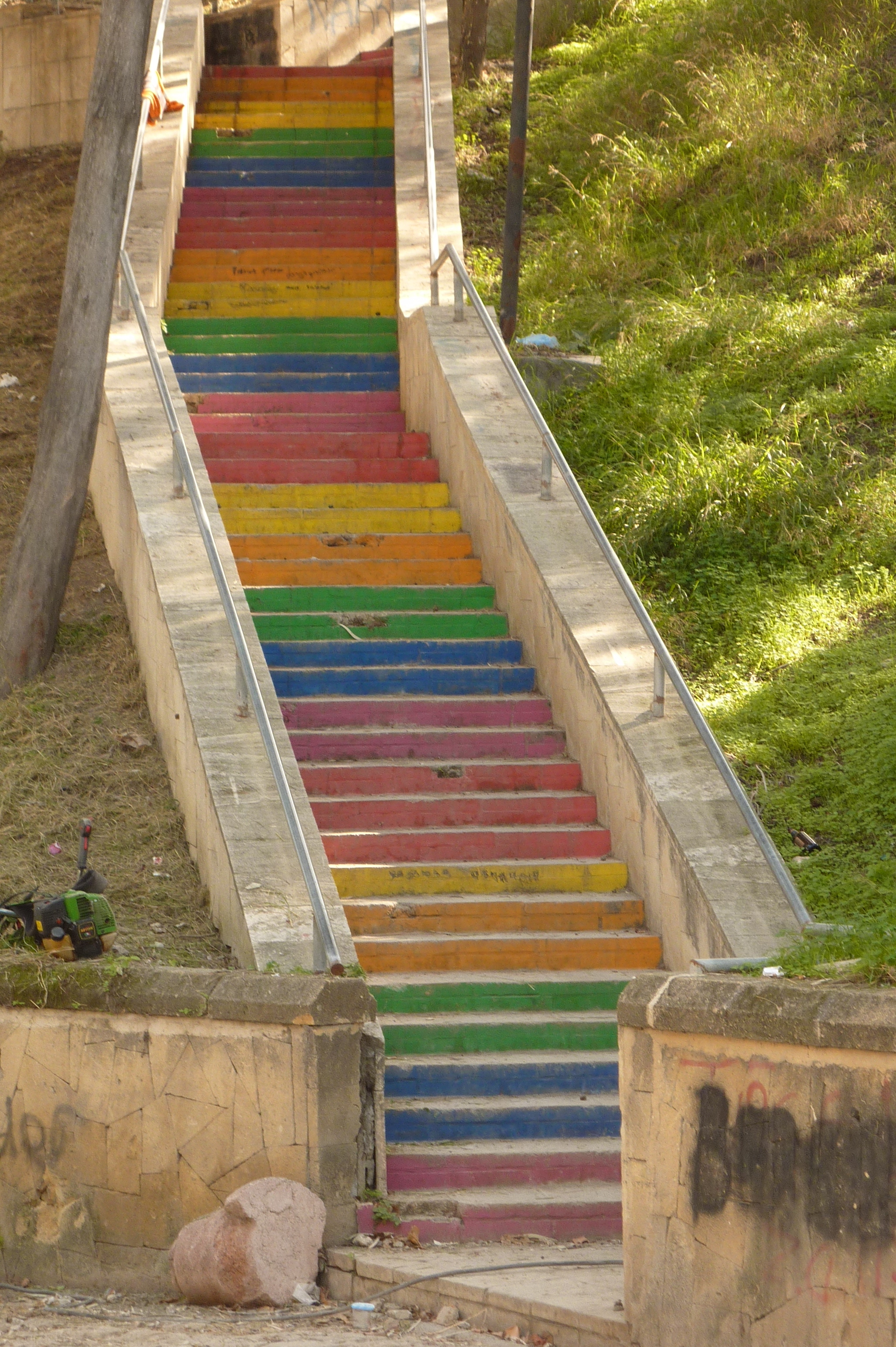
Street art in Kyrenia: steps painted in rainbow colours

Kyrenia annually hosts the Kyrenia Festival of Culture and Arts for the whole month of June. The festival includes concerts ranging from popular Turkish bands and singers, such as Duman, Sertab Erener and Zülfü Livaneli to Latin music and reggae in the city's amphitheatre and the Ramadan Cemil Square, talk shows, plays and musicals performed by theatrical groups from Turkey. The festival in 2012 saw the participation of 500–600 artists and performers. It has also hosted international performers such as the bands UB40 and The Animals and invited street artists from Europe for performances. It has also been praised for its inclusive approach to local musicians as a way of encouraging cultural activity in Northern Cyprus. Under mayor Nidai Güngördü, the festival was renamed "Kyrenia Days of Culture and Arts" with activities spread from May to September.

The city hosted the Golden Island International Film Festival in 2014, the first time such an organization took place in Northern Cyprus. 20 Turkish Cypriot films were shown in the festival as well as foreign films.

The city is home to various musical activities. One such activity is the annual International Bellapais Music Festival, in which notable Turkish Cypriot musicians, such as the pianist Rüya Taner and international musicians participate. Another such organization is the Bellapais Spring Music Festival, which features operas and classical music concerts from Turkish Cypriot, Turkish and international individuals and institutions.

== Education ==
The city has five universities: Girne American University, the University of Kyrenia, Final International University, Cyprus Aydin University and ARUCAD.

== Notable people ==
- Praxander, founder and first king of Kyrenia
- Eleni Mavrou, politician and ex-mayor of Nicosia
- Mehmet Ali Talat, 2nd president of the Turkish Republic of Northern Cyprus, born in Kyrenia
- Osman Türkay, poet, nominated for Nobel Literature Prize in 1988

== International relations ==
=== Twin towns – sister cities ===
Kyrenia is unofficially twinned with:

- Mudanya, Turkey (since 1999)
- Bucharest Sector 4, Romania (since 2013)
- Adana, Turkey
- Çankaya, Turkey
- Karşıyaka, İzmir, Turkey (since 1998)
- Muratpaşa, Antalya, Turkey (since 2009)

== Gallery ==
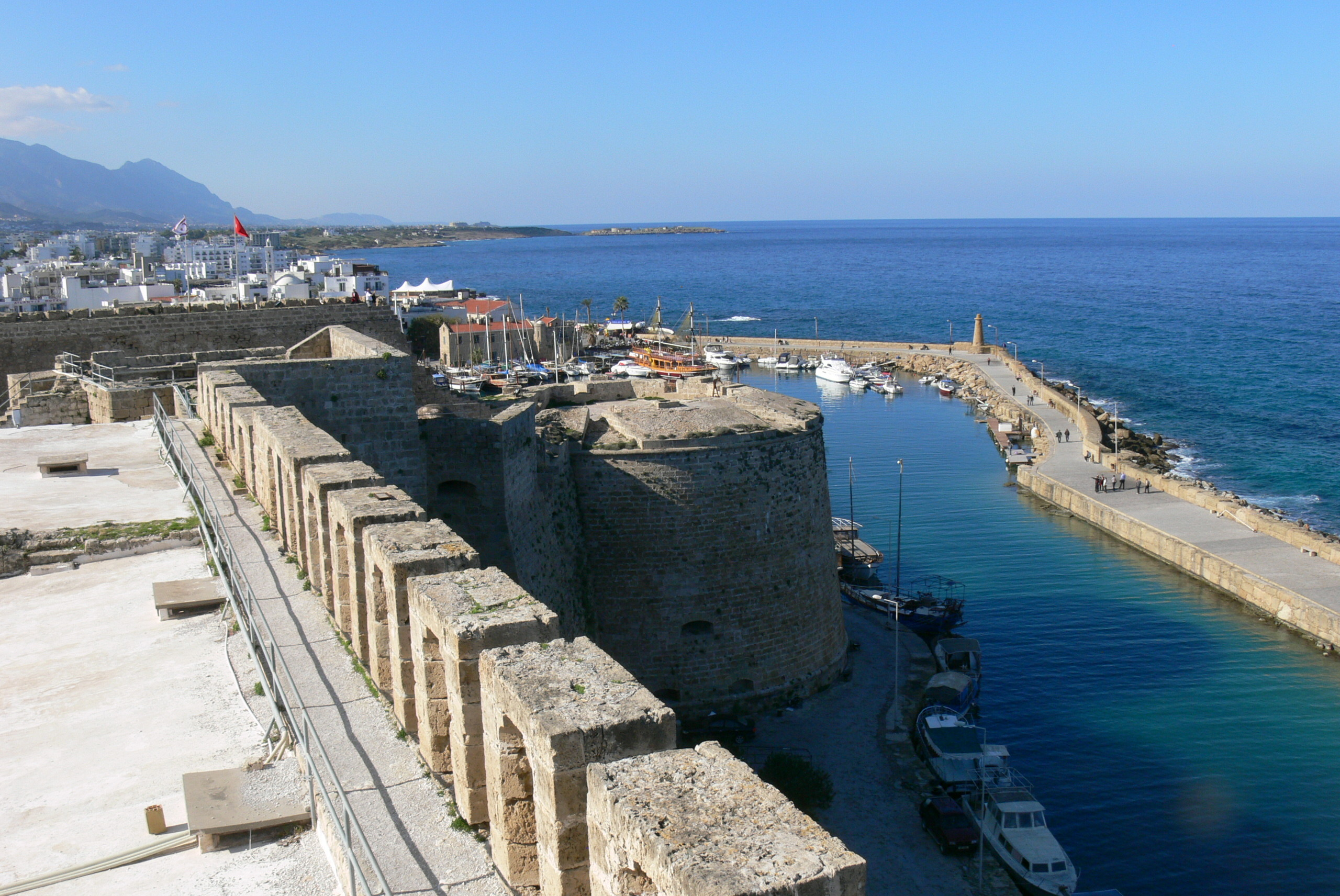
A view from the Kyrenia Castle

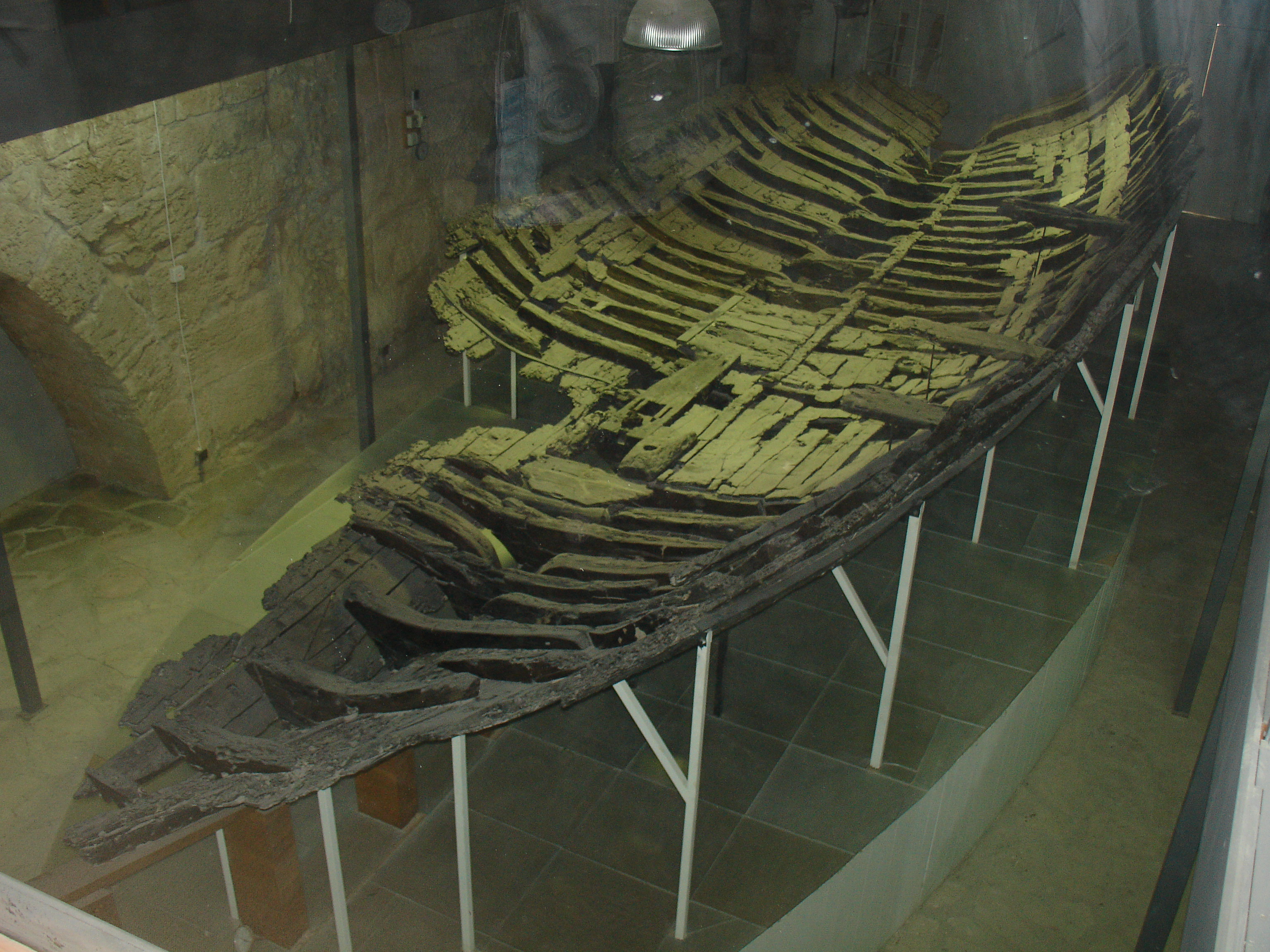
The Kyrenia Shipwreck Museum

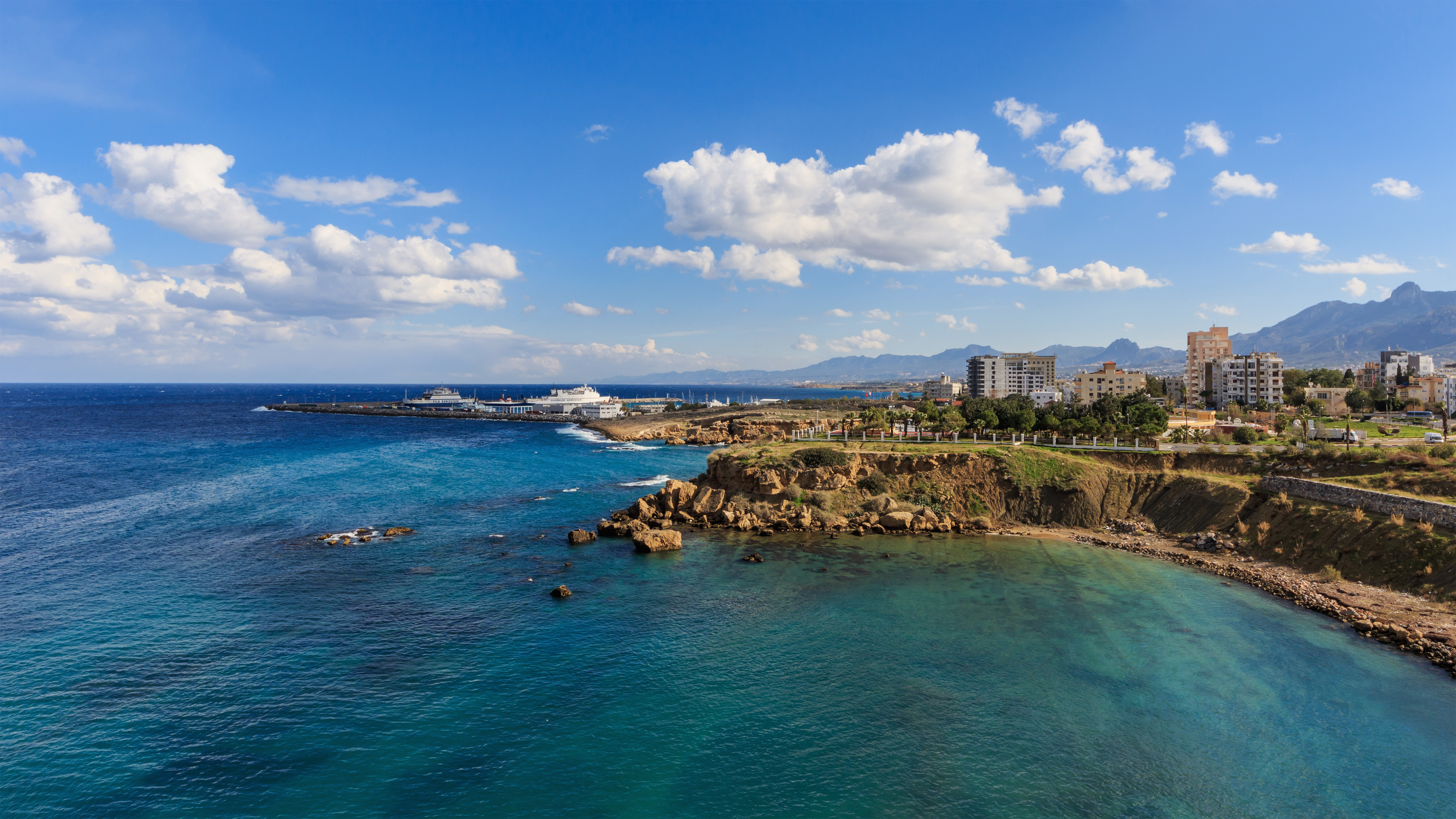
The new harbour of Kyrenia
