= Kazafani =

Kazafani: Καζάφανι (Greek); Kazafana, Ozanköy (Turkish)
- Village
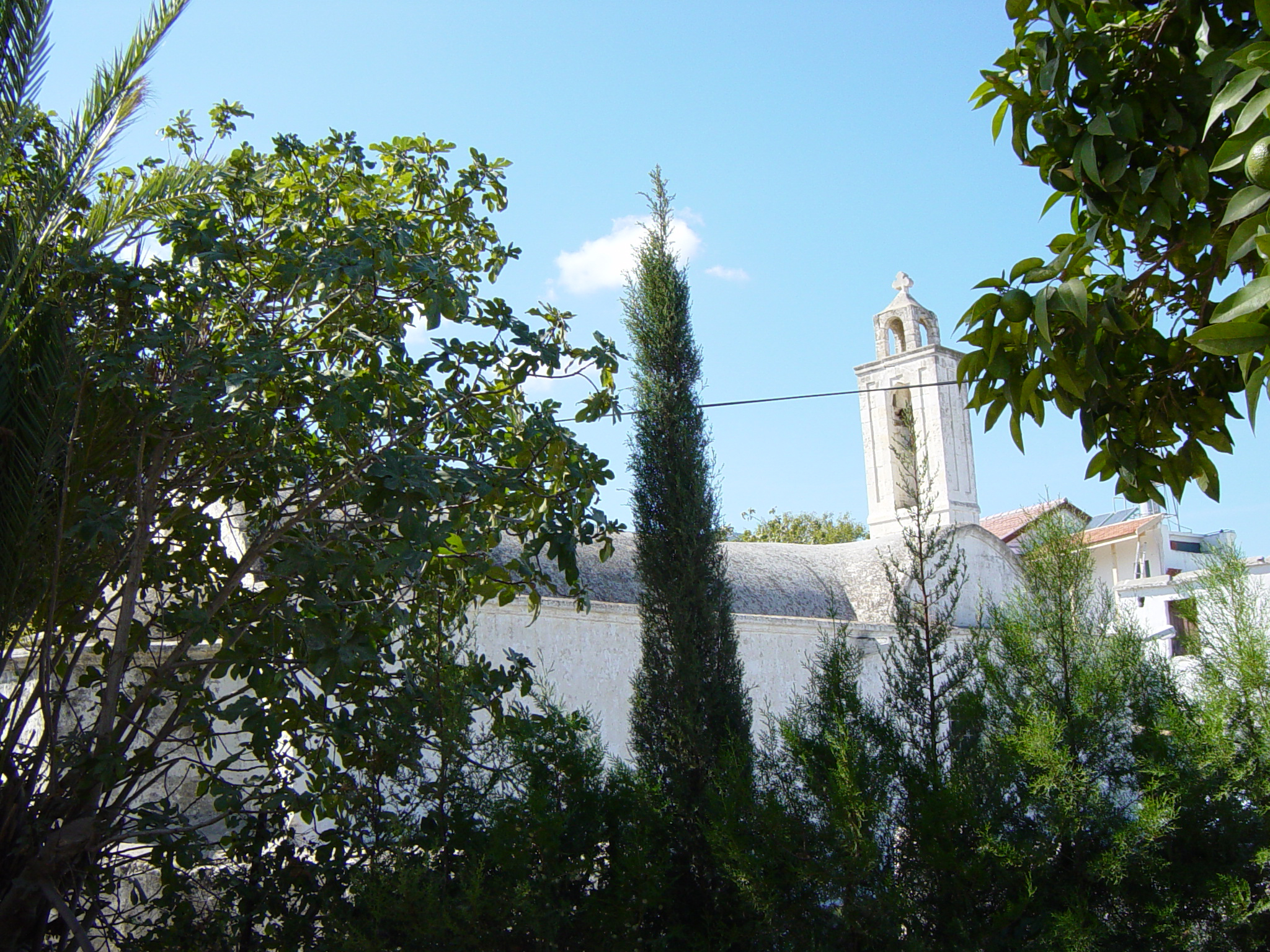
- Kazafani church

- Location in Cyprus
- Coordinates: 35°19′2″N 33°21′15″E
- Country (de jure): Cyprus
  - District: Kyrenia District
- Country (de facto): Northern Cyprus
  - District: Girne District
- Time zone: UTC+2 (EET)
  - Summer (DST): UTC+3 (EEST)

Kazafani or Kazaphani (Greek: Καζάφανι, Turkish: Kazafana or Ozanköy) is a village in the Kyrenia District of Cyprus. It is under the de facto control of Northern Cyprus. It was traditionally agricultural village, originally based around the feudal estate of Casal Pifani (alternatively spelled Pifane, Piphani or Epiphani). This is referenced in the Histoire de l'Île de Chypre by Louis de Mas Latrie on page 510. It is one of the mountain villages that the former Latin inhabitants of Kyrenia Castle were forced into following the Ottoman Conquest of the island, many of their descendants now populating the village. The Monastery of Bellapais has been referred to as the Monastery of Cozzafani (another name of the village), a link that started during the 3rd Crusade. The route that the Crusaders would walk still holds the name 'Crusader Path' today. The origins of the feudal estate (Casal) are from the settling Latin crusaders.

== Culture, sports, and tourism ==
Turkish Cypriot Ozanköy Sports Club was founded in 1956, and now in Cyprus Turkish Football Association (CTFA) K-PET 2nd League.
