= Praxander =

In Greek mythology, Praxander (Greek: Πράξανδρος Praxandros, also Latinised as Praxandrus) was the founder, together with Cepheus, of Keryneia in Cyprus. He is mentioned in the poem Alexandra, attributed to Lycophron, as an Achaean and not of noble descent.
