= Bellapais =

- Αββαείο Μπελαπάις (Greek); Bellapais / Beylerbeyi -Bellabayıs (Turkish language)(Cypriot Turkish)
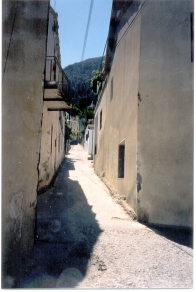

- Location in Cyprus
- Coordinates: 35°18′N 33°21′E
- Country (de jure): Cyprus
  - District: Kyrenia District
- Country (de facto): Northern Cyprus
  - District: Girne District
- Time zone: UTC+2 (EET)
  - Summer (DST): UTC+3 (EEST)

Bellapais is a small village in the Kyrenia District in the northern part of Cyprus, about four miles from the town of Kyrenia. It is under the de facto control of Northern Cyprus.

The village was the home for some years of Lawrence Durrell, who wrote about life in Cyprus in his book Bitter Lemons. He mentions passing the time drinking coffee under the Tree of Idleness in the village and there are two places which lay claim to being the spot. His book did not identify it completely, and two establishments profit from the name. His house, up a very steep climb, has a plaque on it and one can have the pleasure of returning by a not-quite-so-perpendicular way that passes by old olive presses.

The village contains Bellapais Abbey or "The Abbey of Peace (from French: Abbaye de la Belle Paix). Built by canons regular of the Premonstratensian Order in the 13th century, it is a ruin in a position commanding a long view down to Kyrenia and the Mediterranean Sea.

Most of the monastic buildings surround the cloister. In Britain these would normally be built on the south side of the church so to some extent protect the living quarters from the cold air from the north. At Bellapais, the monastic buildings are on the north, probably to be cooler, although occasionally the lay of the land dictated position.

== Gallery ==
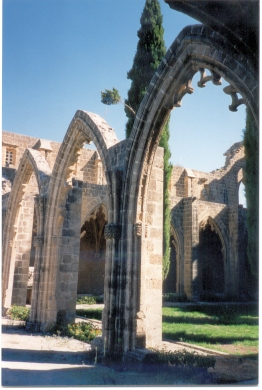
Bellapais

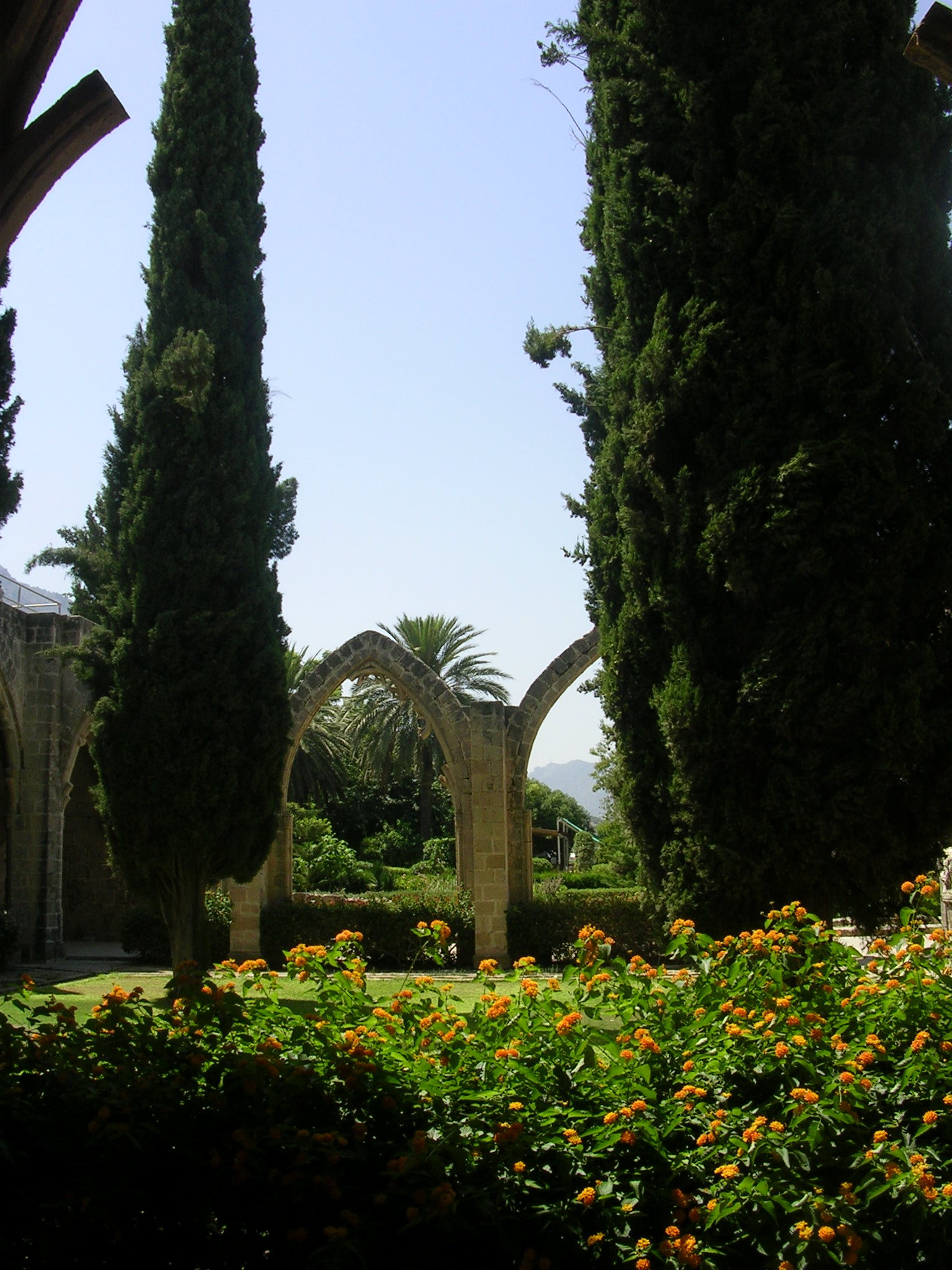
Bellapais Abbey inner court

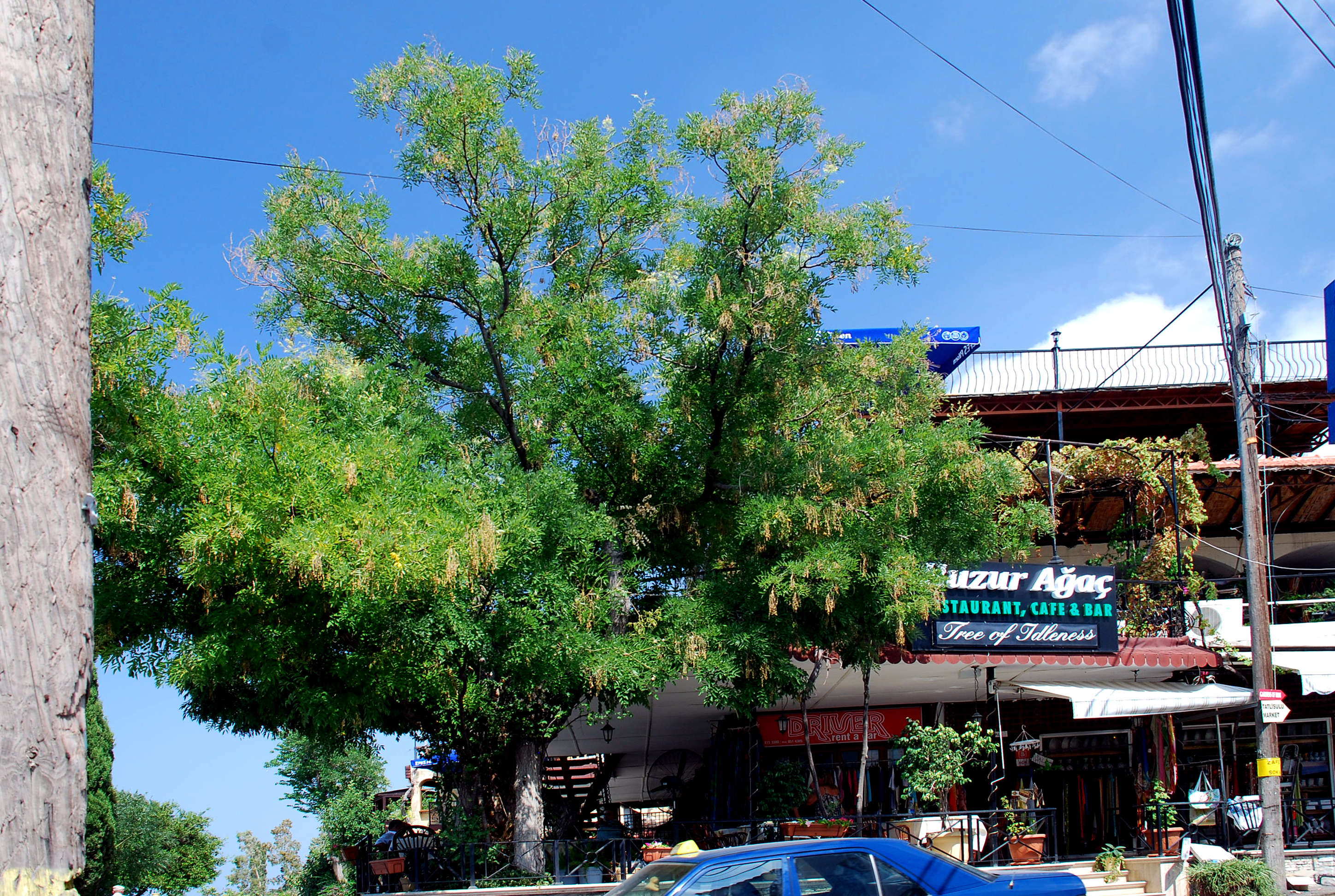
"Tree of Idleness" claimant
