= Kyrenia Castle =

- (Greek: Κάστρο της Κερύνειας, Turkish: Girne Kalesi)
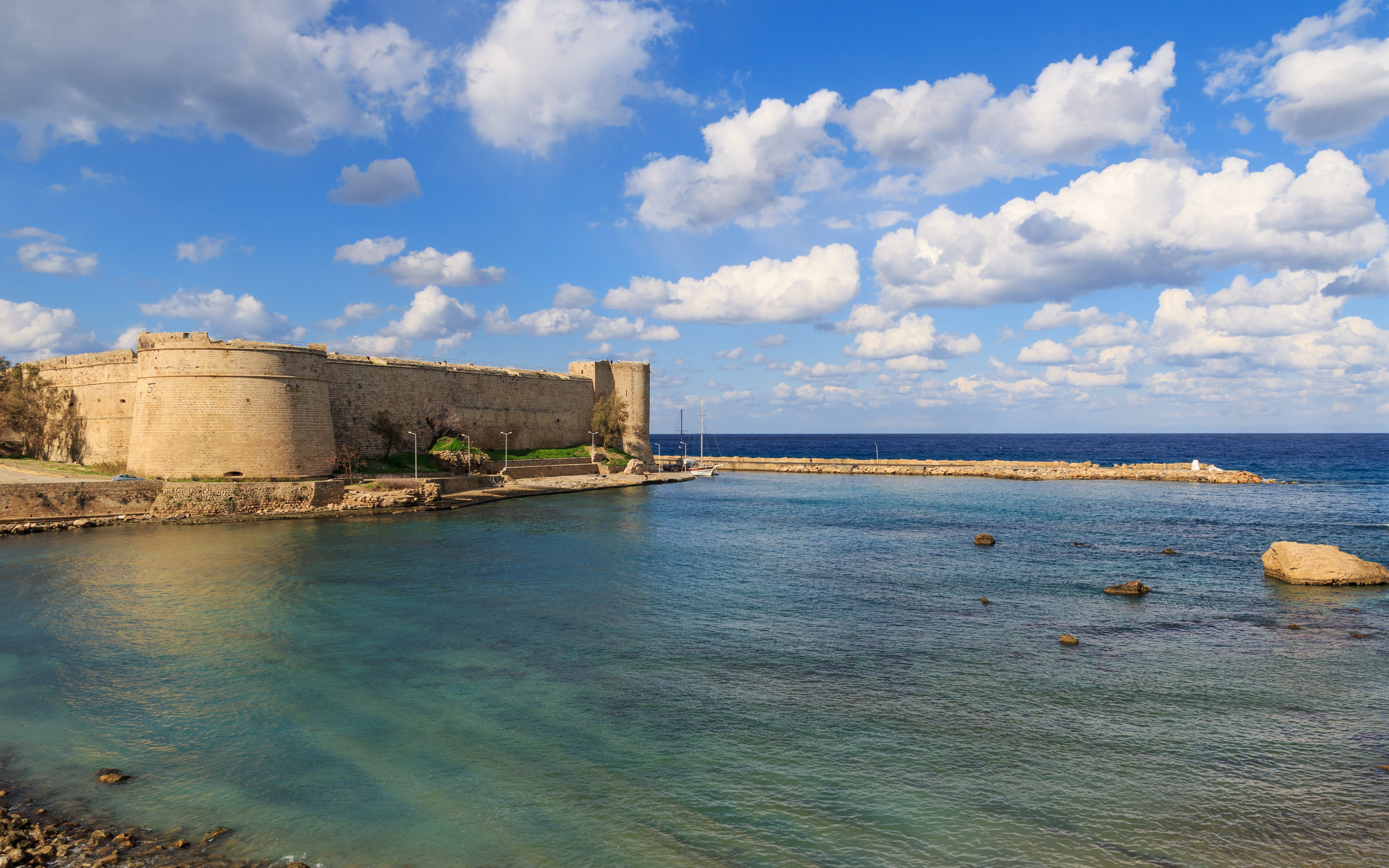
- Kyrenia Castle

- Location within Cyprus

General information
- Architectural style: Medieval
- Location: Kyrenia, De jure Cyprus; De facto Northern Cyprus
- Coordinates: 35.341389°N 33.322222°E
- Construction started: 16th-century

Kyrenia Castle (Greek: Κάστρο της Κερύνειας Turkish: Girne Kalesi) is a 16th-century castle in the north of Cyprus, built by the Venetians over a previous Crusader fortification. Within its walls is a twelfth-century chapel showing reused late Roman capitals, and the Shipwreck Museum.

== History ==
Kyrenia has existed since the 10th century BC. Excavations have revealed Greek traces that date back to the 7th century BC, but the site was developed into a city under Roman rule.

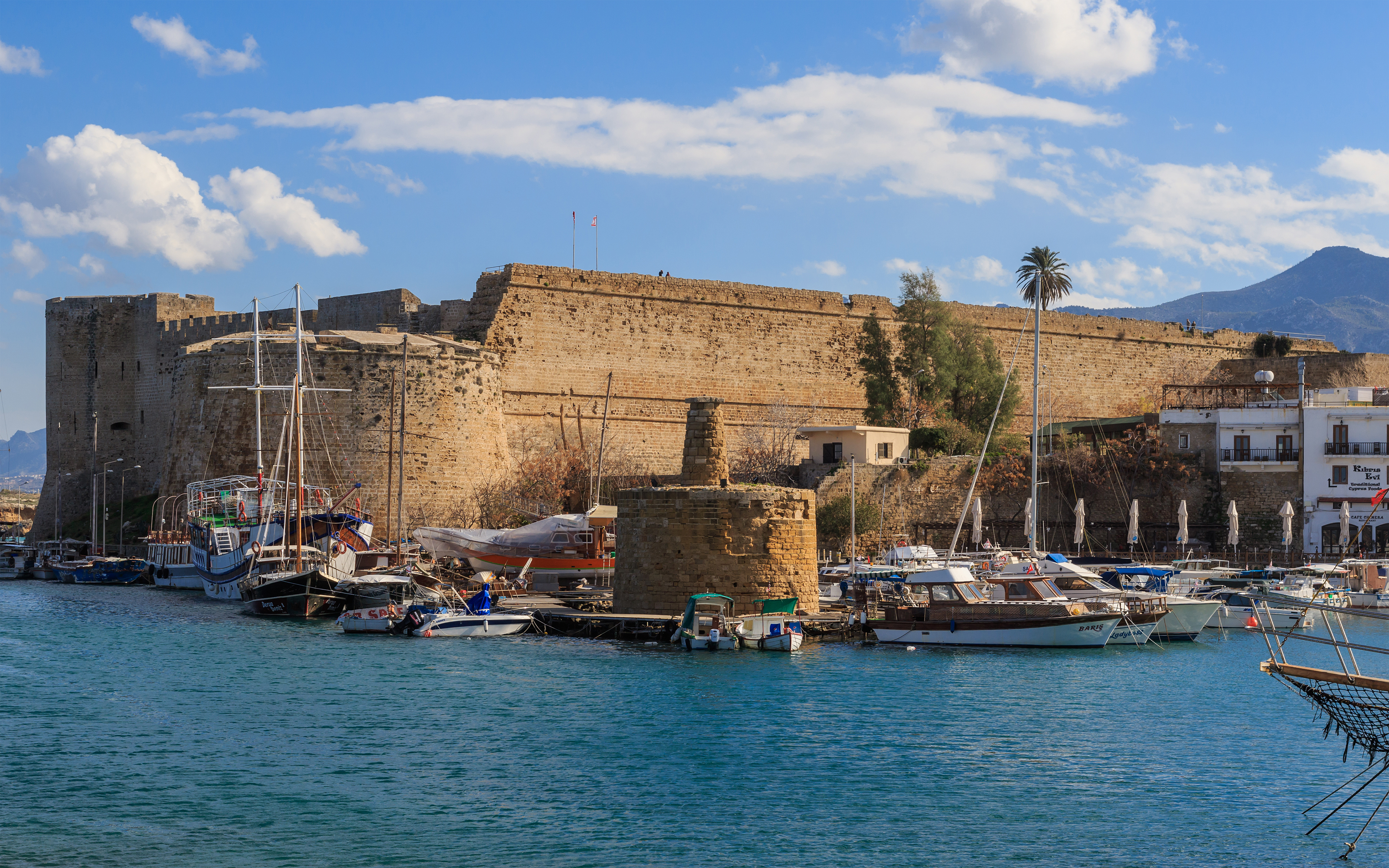
Kyrenia Castle, view from the Old harbour

Research carried out at the site suggests that the Byzantines built the original castle in the 7th century to guard the city against the new Arab maritime threat. The first historical reference to the castle occurs in 1191, when King Richard I of England captured it on his way to the Third Crusade by defeating Isaac Komnenos, an upstart local governor who had proclaimed himself emperor.

After a short period, Richard I sold the island first to the Knights Templar who could not control it because of peasant revolt, and then to his cousin Guy of Lusignan, the former king of Jerusalem. This began the 300 years Lusignan rule over the Kingdom of Cyprus (1192–1489). Initially the castle was quite small. John of Ibelin enlarged it between 1208 and 1211. The castle's main function was military and the improvements consisted of a new entrance, square and horseshoe-shaped towers, embrasures for archers, and dungeons.

The castle was subjected to several sieges. A Genoese attack in 1373 almost destroyed it, and the longest amongst the sieges, in the 15th century, lasted nearly four years and reduced the occupants to eating mice and rats. By 1489 the Venetians had taken control of Cyprus and in 1540 they enlarged the castle, giving it its present-day appearance. The chief changes, such as the addition of thick walls and embrasures for cannons, were adaptations to changes in warfare in the form of gunpowder artillery. The Venetians also installed gun ports at three levels so that they could direct cannon fire against attackers from the land. Inside the castle, they built huge long ramps so as to be able to drag artillery up on the walls. When the work on the castle was finished, its walls also encompassed the small church of St. George, which the Byzantines may have built in the 11th or 12th century.

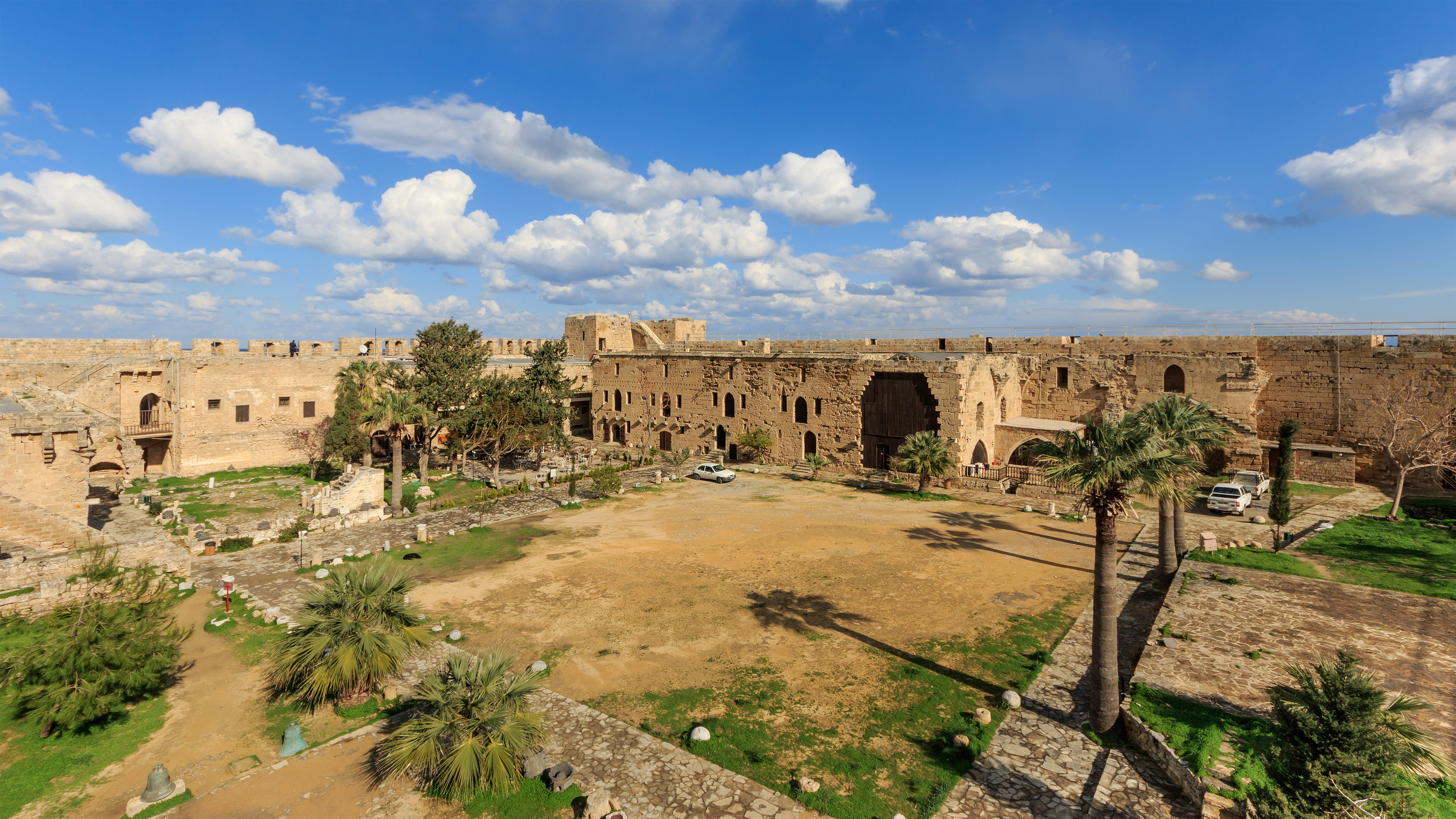
Kyrenia Castle's courtyard

In 1570, Kyrenia surrendered to the Ottomans. The Ottomans made changes to the castle, but the British removed these during their rule of Cyprus. The castle contains the tomb of the Ottoman Admiral Sadik Pasha. The British used the castle as a police barracks and training school. They also used the castle as a prison for members of the Greek Cypriot EOKA organization.

The Kyrenia Department of Antiquities took over custodianship of the castle in 1950, though it reverted to British control during the EOKA turmoil. The department regained control in 1959 and since 1960 the castle has been open to the public. However, from 1963 to 1967 the Cypriot National Guard used the castle as a military headquarters. Following the Turkish invasion of Cyprus in 1974, the Girne Department of Antiquities and Museums took over responsibility for the castle's preservation and use. The Department keeps icons that were collected from churches in the Kyrenia area pre-1974 and has stored them in the castle's locked rooms for safekeeping. Some of these are now on display in the Archangel Michael Church.

== Current features ==
The moat on the landward side of the castle was full of water prior to the 14th century AD and served as a harbour to the castle. One enters the castle through its north-west entrance, which opens on a bridge spanning the moat. From the first gate, lying to the north west of the fortified wall that the Venetians built, one comes to a vaulted corridor that leads to the entrance of the Lusignan castle. A passage to the left of the corridor gives entry to the cruciform Church of St. George. The dome of this church rests on marble columns with Corinthian capitals that were salvaged from an older building elsewhere and placed here.

The tomb in the entrance corridor of the Lusignan castle belongs to the Ottoman Admiral Sadik Pasha who conquered Kyrenia in 1570. The corridor then leads to the castle's large inner courtyard, which is lined with guardrooms, stables and living quarters. The arched rooms (royal guard rooms, prison etc.) to the north and east of the yard belong to the Lusignan period. The royal quarters to the west of the yard, as well as the big and arched windows of the little Latin Temple also date back to the Lusignan period. On the southern part of the yard there are fortifications and remains belonging to the Byzantine period. Ramps lead to the defences on the upper sections of the walls. One can climb steps to the Lusignan royal apartments and a small chapel. The depths of Kyrenia Castle contain dungeons, storage rooms and the powder magazines. Off the courtyard, there is a room displaying the finds from various archaeological sites such as the Akdeniz village tomb, the Neolithic settlement at Vrysi, and the Kirni Bronze Age tomb. There is also a small souvenir shop and simple café at the northern end of the courtyard.

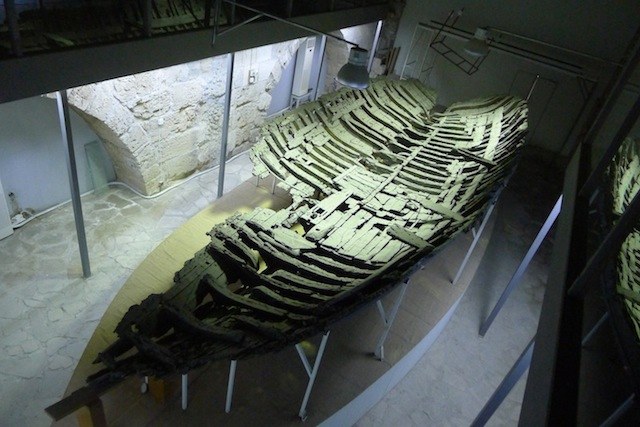
The Kyrenia

== Shipwreck museum ==
One of the rooms leading off the courtyard contains the Shipwreck Museum, which exhibits the remains of a Greek merchant ship from the 4th century BC, one of the oldest vessels ever to be recovered, together with its cargo. In 1965, Andreas Kariolou, a Greek-Cypriot diver, discovered the vessel, laden with millstones and amphorae of wine from Kos and Rhodes. The vessel was sailing to Cyprus when a storm wrecked it outside Kyrenia harbour. In 1967 he showed the wreck to archeologists. A team, under Michael Katsev of the University of Pennsylvania Museum of Archaeology and Anthropology, then studied the wreck from 1969 to 1974. The vessel was approximately already 80 years old at the time it sank. Today, the 14-metre-long hull (47 ft), made of Aleppo pine sheathed in lead, is preserved in a specially controlled environment in the museum, together with its amphorae.

== Popular culture ==
A large part of the PlayStation Portable 2009 game Assassin's Creed: Bloodlines takes place in Kyrenia and the castle.

== See also ==
- List of Crusader castles
