= English International School =

English International School may refer to:

- English International School in Benin
- English International School Prague
- English School (Helsinki)
- Home of English International School, Cambodia
- International Graduate School of English, South Korea
- The English School, Nicosia
