= Education in Northern Cyprus =

Education in Northern Cyprus is organized by the Ministry of National Education and Culture. 5 years of primary education is mandatory.

== Kindergarten ==
Children in Northern Cyprus, below age 6, can attend kindergartens of public and private institutions. Kindergarten is not mandatory.

== Elementary school ==
Elementary school provides 5 years of education for children between the ages of 6 and 11. All elementary schools are public and free.

== High school ==
High schools provide a minimum 6 years of education, where 3 years last for junior high school (Ortaokul). There are different kinds of high schools in Northern Cypriot education system, such as standard public high schools, private high schools, science high schools, vocational high schools, technical high schools and fine arts high schools. As of 2008, there are 18 high schools, 14 junior high schools and 12 vocational high schools.

== Universities ==
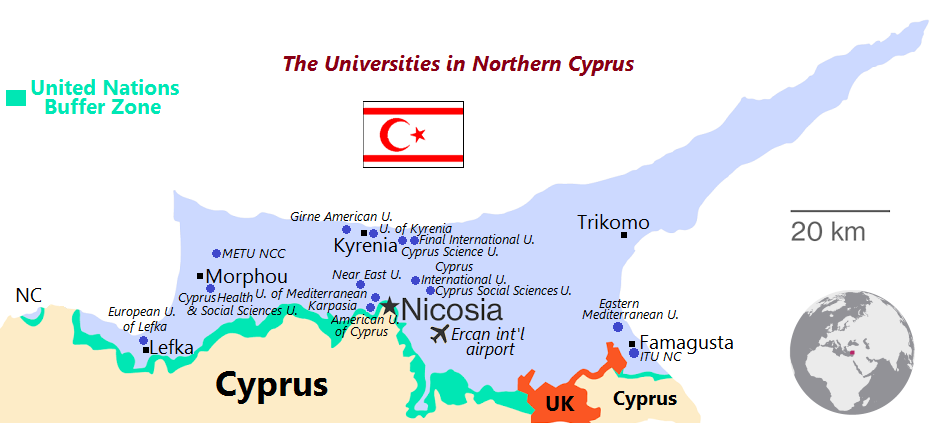
Map showing major universities

All of universities in Northern Cyprus are private except Eastern Mediterranean University, METU-NCC, and ITU-TRNC. In 2013 there were 63,765 university students from 114 countries in nine universities in Northern Cyprus. In 2014, the number of students increased to 70,004, (15,210 Turkish Cypriots; 36,148 from Turkey; 18,646 international students). According to the Financial Times,, this grew to 100,000 students in 2024, with half from Turkey, 40% from other countries and the remainder local students. Tuition revenues from international students are reportedly the main driver of Northern Cyprus' economy, with France24 reporting that it generates a third of the country's GDP. However, the educational sector has been criticized for misleading recruitment tactics, mainly around misrepresenting the country as the EU-member state Republic of Cyprus on the south of the island, as well as false information about international accreditation, scholarships, jobs and housing. It has also been claimed by the government of the Republic of Cyprus that a portion of students only enroll to cross the UN buffer zone and claim asylum there. Higher education in Northern Cyprus is administered and accredited by YÖDAK, with 17 universities also managed by the Council of Higher Education in Turkey.

There are 19 universities in Northern Cyprus:

University	Turkish Name	Location	Type	Official Website
Cyprus West University	Kıbrıs Batı Üniversitesi	Famagusta	Private	https://cwu.edu.tr/
Girne American University	Girne Amerikan Üniversitesi	Kyrenia (Karaoğlanoğlu county)	Private	https://www.gau.edu.tr
The American University of Cyprus	Kıbrıs Amerikan Üniversitesi	Nicosia	Private	https://www.auc.edu.tr/en
Eastern Mediterranean University	Doğu Akdeniz Üniversitesi	Famagusta	Public	https://www.emu.edu.tr
Cyprus International University	Uluslararası Kıbrıs Üniversitesi	North Nicosia (Haspolat county)	Private	https://www.ciu.edu.tr
European Leadership University	Avrupa Liderlik Üniversitesi	Famagusta	Private	https://elu.edu.tr/
Near East University	Yakın Doğu Üniversitesi	North Nicosia	Private	http://www.neu.edu.tr
European University of Lefke	Lefke Avrupa Üniversitesi	Morphou	Private	https://www.eul.edu.tr
University of Mediterranean Karpasia	Akdeniz Karpaz Üniversitesi	North Nicosia	Private	https://www.akun.edu.tr/en-US
University of Kyrenia	Girne Üniversitesi	Kyrenia	Private	https://kyrenia.edu.tr
Cyprus Science University	Kıbrıs İlim Üniversitesi	Kyrenia	Private	https://www.csu.edu.tr
Middle East Technical University-Northern Cyprus Campus	Orta Doğu Teknik Üniversitesi-Kuzey Kıbrıs Kampusu	Morphou	State	https://ncc.metu.edu.tr
Istanbul Technical University-TRNC	İstanbul Teknik Üniversitesi-KKTC	Famagusta	State	https://www.kktc.itu.edu.tr/
Rauf Denktas University	Rauf Denktaş Üniversitesi	North Nicosia	Private	https://rdu.edu.tr/
Mesarya Technical University	Mesarya Teknik Üniversitesi	North Nicosia (Meriç county)	Private	https://www.mesarya.university/
Bahçeşehir Cyprus University	Bahçeşehir Kıbrıs Üniversitesi	North Nicosia (Alayköy, Kumsal county)	Private	https://baucyprus.edu.tr/
Arkin University of Creative Arts and Design (ARUCAD)	Arkın Yaratıcı Sanatlar ve Tasarım Üniversitesi	Kyrenia	Private	https://www.arucad.edu.tr/
Onbes Kasim Kibris University	Onbeş Kasım Kıbrıs Üniversitesi	North Nicosia (Küçük Kaymaklı, Düzova county)	Private	https://www.onbeskku.edu.tr/
Cyprus Health and Social Sciences University (CHSSU)	Kıbrıs Sağlık ve Toplum Bilimleri Üniversitesi (KSTU)	Morphou	Private	https://eng.kstu.edu.tr/
Cyprus Social Sciences University	Kıbrıs Sosyal Bilimler Üniversitesi	North Nicosia	Private	https://kisbu.edu.tr/

Atatürk Teacher Academy and Police Academy provide vocational education in related subjects.

== International membership of Northern Cyprus institutions ==
Institution	Membership	Membership Date
The Association of North Cyprus Biologists (Bio-Der)	European Countries Biologists Association (ECBA)	2006
Northern Cyprus' Educational Sciences Association (KEB-DER)	European Educational Research Association	13.08.2010
North Cyprus' Higher Education Planning Evaluation Accreditation and Coordination Council (YÖDAK)	The European Association for Quality Assurance in Higher Education (ENQA); The International Network for Quality Assurance Agencies in Higher Education (INQAAHE); UK - National Academic Recognition Information Center (UK-NARIC); The Central and Eastern European Network of Quality Assurance Agencies in Higher Education (CEENQA)	2007 2009; 2009; 2013

- Near East University’s Faculty of Pharmacy was accredited by The Accreditation Council for Pharmacy Education (ACPE) in 2014.
- The law faculties of the three universities of Northern Cyprus were accredited by European Law Faculties Association (ELFA).
- The English Preparatory School of European University of Lefke was accredited by Pearson Assured in 2015.
- Near East University and Eastern Mediterranean University are members of European University Association.
- Girne American University and Cyprus International University are members of European Council for Business Education (ECBE).

On 17-18 May 2019, The Central and Eastern European Network of Quality Assurance Agencies in Higher Education (CEENQA) held its meeting in Northern Cyprus; 26 quality assurance institutions from 20 countries participated the meeting.
