= Kalo Chorio Kapouti =

Kalo Chorio Kapouti: Καλό Χωριό Καπούτι (Greek); Kalkanlı (Turkish)
- Location within Cyprus
- Coordinates: 35°14′40″N 33°02′20″E
- Country (de jure): Cyprus
  - District: Nicosia District
- Country (de facto): Northern Cyprus
  - District: Güzelyurt District
- Elevation: 150 m (490 ft)

Population (2011)
  - Total: 2,305
- Time zone: UTC+2 (EET)
  - Summer (DST): UTC+3 (EEST)

Kalo Chorio Kapouti (Greek: Καλό Χωριό Καπούτι; Turkish: Kalkanlı) is a village in Cyprus, near Morphou, and 32 km north-west of Nicosia. The village is connected to Diorios, another village to the north. De facto, it is under the control of Northern Cyprus.

Before 1974, Kalo Chorio Kapouti was inhabited by Greek Cypriots. Displaced Turkish Cypriots from Kato Arodes resettled in Kapouti, giving it the Turkish name of their old village (Kalkanlı, meaning "armed with a shield").

== Geography ==
To the south and south-west of the settlement the relief is soft and without significant hills. To the north, north-west and east it is full of hills, some as high as 290 metres. The river Aloupos, to the north of the village, and the Ovgos (Ovkos) to the south have eroded the landscape. The geology is dominated by the calcareous sandstones, sands, sandy marls, Kythrea Flysch and recent revived affairs of Olokainis of geological period. The types of soil developed in this region are terra rossa, proschosigeni and kafkalles.

The main crops are citrus fruits, olives, oil, vegetables, veterinary surgeon plants and cereals. The south-western department of the village is influenced by the rich water-bearing layer of western mesaorias or Morfou. In 1966 in the region they have enough open drillings for the irrigation of 86 hectares (640 scales) of gardens of citrus fruits. To the north and east of the village is uncultivated landand in this grow scattered pines and bushy natural vegetation.

== Demographics ==
The population of the village increased swiftly from 1881 up to 1973 largely because of its vicinity to the town of Morfou, in which a number of the residents of the village were employed, as well as in his fertile ground. In 1881 the village had 243 residents, increasing to 308 in 1891, 344 in 1901, 348 in 1911, 418 in 1921, 474 in 1931, 13 in 1946, 766 in 1960 and 933 in 1973 (according to research of Mr Charalambos Tterlikkas in 20/7/1974 it had 1126 residents).

== Archaeology ==
To the south-west of the village and in its administrative limits is an archaeological area in the locality Toumpa tou Skourou. Originally this village was more generally called Kapoutin, that it constituted parafthora the name [Kapoutsi], thing that means that the initial settlement had been created in the years France people. Moreover the village is found marked in old charts as Capuci. Also, called this, Our Latri reports the village that includes him in the list of mansions of fiefs that however later constituted the fortune of the royal family of Cyprus. In the 15th - 16th century is placed temporarily the construction of the first church of the village dedicated to Ayios Georgios (Saint George).

== Education ==
Middle East Technical University-Northern Cyprus Campus is built on an area of 339 hectares (137 acres), next to Kalkanlı. Today, METU NCC is an excellent campus with its high-tech infrastructure, very modern education buildings and laboratories, the Cultural and Convention Center, Administration - Library - IT Center Complex, Cafeteria, Shopping Center, Student Association Rooms, Dormitories, Staff Housing, Fitness-Wellness Club, Post Office, Book Store, Health & Counseling Center, Sports Complex, and an outdoor swimming pool . The Campus is designed with all the necessary provisions to accommodate physically handicapped students to achieve their full potential. The district has been separated from Lefkoşa District.
