= The English School =

The English School may refer to:

== Schools ==
- English School attached to Guangdong University of Foreign Studies, a school in Guangzhou, China
- The English School (Colegio de Inglaterra), a school in Bogotá, Colombia
- The English School, Nicosia, a school in Nicosia, Cyprus
- The English School of Kyrenia, a school in Northern Cyprus
- English School (Helsinki), a school in Helsinki, Finland
- English School Fahaheel Kuwait, a school in Mangaf, Kuwait
- SMK Sultan Yussuf, formerly the Batu Gajah Government English School, in Perak, Malaysia
- Internationella Engelska Skolan, a group of schools in Sweden
- The English High School, a school in Jamaica Plain, Massachusetts, commonly referred to as Boston English

== Other ==
- English school of international relations theory

== See also ==
- English College, Rome, a Catholic seminary in Rome, Italy
