= Hala Sultan (disambiguation) =

Hala Sultan, or Umm Haram, was a female disciple (known in Arabic as Sahaba) of Muhammad.

Hala Sultan may also refer to:

- Hala Sultan Tekke, a mosque in Cyprus
- Hala Sultan, a secondary school in Northern Cyprus
