= University of Sialkot =

University in Punjab, Pakistan

- Urdu: جامعہ سیالکوٹ
- Former name: University Of Gujrat Sub Campus Sialkot
- Motto: ستاروں سے آگے جہاں اور بھی ہیں
- Motto in English: There are other universes beyond the stars
- Type: Private
- Established: 2013 (Upgraded To University 2018)
- Accreditation: Higher Education Commission
- Chairman: Faisal Manzoor
- Vice-Chancellor: Prof. (Meritorious) Dr. M Khaleeq ur Rahman
- Director: Faisal Manzoor
- Academic staff: 600+
- Students: 10,000+
- Location: Sialkot, Punjab, Pakistan
- Campus: Main
- Mascot: USKTIAN
- Website: uskt.edu.pk

The University of Sialkot (USKT; Urdu: جامعہ سیالکوٹ) is a private university located in Sialkot, Punjab, Pakistan. It was established in 2018 and has eight faculties.

== History ==
In 2013, University of Gujrat (Urdu: جامعہ گجرات) established a sub-campus in Sialkot under Public Private Partnership (PPP) mode. Later in 2018, the campus was upgraded to a full-fledged university under private sector. Chartered under the University of Sialkot Act (IX) of 2018, the university is providing higher learning in the areas of Computing & IT, Engineering & Architecture, Humanities & Social Sciences, Law, Management, Textile & Fashion Design, Sciences and Allied Health Sciences. With 08 Faculties, 30 Academic Departments, 94 Academic Programs, and around 10,000 students.

== Faculties and courses ==
=== Faculty of Pharmacy and Allied Health Sciences ===
- ADP Sports and Rehabilitation Sciences
- Doctor of Physiotherapy (5 Year)
- Doctor of Pharmacy (5 Year)
- BS Dietetics and Nutrition
- BS Imaging Technology
- BS Medical Lab Technology

=== Faculty of Computing & Information Technology ===
- ADP Computer Science
- ADP Information Technology Studies
- ADP Computer Programming
- ADP Software Development
- BS Computer Science
- BS Information Technology
- BS Software Engineering
- MS Computer Science
- Ph.D. Computer Science

=== Faculty of Engineering & Architecture ===
- ADP Electrical Engineering Technology
- ADP Mechanical Engineering Technology
- ADP Structural Engineering Technology
- BSc Civil Engineering Technology
- BSc Electrical Engineering Technology
- BSc Mechanical Engineering Technology
- MS Electrical Engineering

=== Faculty of Humanities & Social Science ===
- ADP Media and Communication Studies
- ADP English
- BS English
- BS Clinical Psychology
- BS Media and Communication
- BS International Relations
- BS Urdu
- MS English
- MS Islamic Studies
- MS Education
- MS Urdu
- MS International Relations

=== Faculty of Law ===
- Paralegal
- LL.B. [to be offered in Fall Semester]

=== Faculty of Management & Administrative Sciences ===
- ADP Business Studies
- ADP Account, Finance & E-Commerce
- BBA
- BS Accounting and Finance
- BS Aviation Management
- MS Business Administration
- MBA
- Executive MBA

=== Faculty of Sciences ===
- BS Biochemistry
- BS Biotechnology
- BS Chemistry
- BS Mathematics
- BS Physics
- BS Zoology
- MS Mathematic
- MS Physics
- MS Chemistry
- MS Zoology
- MS Biological Sciences

=== Faculty of Textile & Fashion Designing ===
- ADP Fashion Design
- BS Program | 4 Year
- BS Fashion Design

== Center for Extended Learning ==
The Center for Extended Learning, University of Sialkot (USKT) has been established as a platform for Business Executives, Managers, Professionals, and Students to enhance their skills, refresh their knowledge and cover academic deficiencies.

== International Collaborations ==
- Istanbul Gelisim University
- Jiangsu University
- Istanbul Gelisim University
- Uşak University
- Manisa Celal Bayar University
- Yeditepe University
- Istanbul Aydin University
- Uşak University
- Istanbul Nişantaşı University
- Cyprus Science University
- Piri Reis University
- University College of Technology Sarawak
- University Technology Malaysia
- Malaysia University of Science & Technology
- Universiti Teknologi Petronas
- Singapore University of Social Sciences
- Maldives National University
- Azerbaijan Technical University
- Khazar University
- Western Caspian University
- Baku State University
- Universitas Negeri Padang
- University of Turin
- A.S. Pushkin Brest State University
- Urgench State University
- Tashkent State Transport University
- VSB – Technical University of Ostrava
- University of Novi Pazar
- University of A Coruña
- University of Murcia
- University of Minho

== See also ==
- University of Gujrat
