= School of English =

Various English literature university departments or programs are known as the School of English. Articles on such schools include:

- School of English (University of Wales, Bangor), UK
- Birmingham City University School of English, UK

== See also ==
- The English School (disambiguation), various schools
