= Mehmet Zeyrek =

Turkish high energy physicist (born 1960)

Prof. Dr. Mehmet Zeyrek
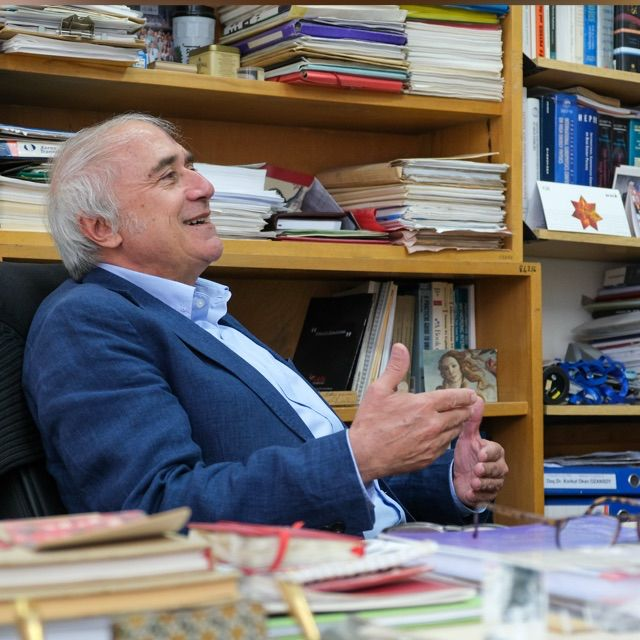

Vice President of Middle East Technical University
- In office 28 July 2016 – 16 August 2024

President of Middle East Technical University NCC
- In office 3 November 2021 – 11 September 2024

Head of Physics Department of Middle East Technical University
- In office 23 January 2012 – 2 August 2016

Personal details
- Born: Mehmet Zeyrek; 1960 (age 65–66) Ankara, Turkey

Mehmet Zeyrek (born 1960 in Ankara) is a Turkish high energy physicist. His research interests are experimental and phenomenological high energy physics, particle and radiation detectors and various applications of detectors. He is currently a member and the team leader of METU group of the LHC CMS at the CERN Laboratory in Switzerland and the Belle2 experiments at the KEK Laboratory in Japan.

== Education ==
Mehmet Zeyrek graduated from the Department of Physics at METU in 1982, and received his master's degree in 1985 and his doctorate in 1991 from the same department. He completed his doctoral studies at the CERN Laboratory in Switzerland as a TÜBİTAK scholarship holder and continued his postdoctoral studies at the same laboratory. He worked as a visiting researcher at Nagoya University in Japan and as a visiting professor at Texas Tech University in the USA.

== Career ==
Mehmet Zeyrek became an assistant in the Department of Physics at METU in 1982, a lecturer in 1993, an assistant professor in 1996, an associate professor in 1998 and a professor in 2003. He was a faculty board member of the Faculty of Arts and Sciences at METU between 1997-2001 and 2003-2009, and the head of the METU Physics Department between 2012-2016.

He served as Vice President responsible for research and budget at METU between 2016-2024, a member of the METU Northern Cyprus Campus Board of Directors between 2016-2021, and as the President of the METU Northern Cyprus Campus Board of Directors and the President of the Campus between 2021-2024. He also served as the Vice Chairman of the METU Teknokent Board of Directors between 2020-2024
