= List of schools in Northern Cyprus =

This is a list of schools in primary and secondary education in Northern Cyprus. Tertiary schools are maintained at the list of universities and colleges in Northern Cyprus. The schools are listed according to their highest level of education.

== Primary schools ==
This list includes active primary schools in Northern Cyprus. Some of the listed primary schools may also have pre-school sections. Primary schools provide the initial 5 years of the 12-year school education.

=== Public ===
Public schools are owned by the state and governed by the Ministry of Education and Culture. There is no tuition fee for public schools.

==== Lefkoşa District ====
- 9 Eylül İlkokulu
- Arabahmet İlkokulu
- Akıncılar İlkokulu
- Alayköy İlkokulu
- Atatürk İlkokulu
- Balıkesir-Meriç İlkokulu
- Cihangir-Düzova İlkokulu
- Çağlayan Cumhuriyet İlkokulu
- Değirmenlik İlkokulu
- Dilekkaya İlkokulu
- Gelibolu İlkokulu
- Gönyeli İlkokulu
- Hamitköy Dr. Fazıl Küçük İlkokulu
- Haspolat İlkokulu
- Necati Taşkın İlkokulu
- Şehit Doğan Ahmet İlkokulu
- Şehit Ertuğrul İlkokulu
- Şehit Mehmet Eray İlkokulu
- Şehit Tuncer İlkokulu
- Şehit Yalçın İlkokulu

==== Gazimağusa District ====
- Akdoğan Dr. Fazıl Küçük İlkokulu
- Akova-Yıldırım İlkokulu
- Alaniçi İlkokulu
- Alasya İlkokulu
- Beyarmudu İlkokulu
- Canbulat İlkokulu
- Çayönü-İncirli İlkokulu
- Dortyol İlkokulu
- Eşref Bitlis İlkokulu
- Gazi İlkokulu
- Geçitkale İlkokulu
- Güvercinlik Rauf Raif Denktaş İlkokulu
- İnönü İlkokulu
- Karakol İlkokulu
- Mormenekşe İlkokulu
- Polatpaşa İlkokulu
- Serdarlı İlkokulu
- Şehit Hüseyin Akil İlkokulu
- Şehit Mustafa Kurtuluş İlkokulu
- Şehit Osman Ahmet İlkokulu
- Şehit Salih Terzi İlkokulu
- Şehit Zeki Salih İlkokulu
- Tatlısu İlkokulu
- Türkmenköy İlkokulu
- Ulukışla İlkokulu
- Vadili İlkokulu
- Yeniboğaziçi İlkokulu

==== Girne District ====
- 23 Nisan İlkokulu
- Ağırdağ-Dağyolu İlkokulu
- Alsancak İlkokulu
- Bahçeli İlkokulu
- Çamlıbel Aysun İlkokulu
- Çatalköy İlkokulu
- Dikmen İlkokulu
- Esentepe İlkokulu
- Karakum İlkokulu
- Karaoğlanoğlu İlkokulu
- Karşıyaka Merkez İlkokulu
- KTEV Şehit Hasan Cafer İlkokulu
- Lapta İlkokulu
- Mehmet Boransel İlkokulu
- Tepebaşı İlkokulu

==== Güzelyurt District ====
- Aydınköy İlkokulu
- Barış İlkokulu
- Fikri Karayel İlkokulu
- Kurtuluş İlkokulu
- Özgürlük İlkokulu
- Serhatköy İlkokulu
- Zümrütköy İlkokulu

==== İskele District ====
- Boğaziçi İlkokulu
- Büyükkonuk İlkokulu
- Çayırova İlkokulu
- Dipkarpaz İlkokulu
- Kaplıca İlkokulu
- Kumyalı İlkokulu
- Mehmetçik İlkokulu
- Ötüken İlkokulu
- Şehit İlker Karter İlkokulu
- Şehit Menteş Zorba İlkokulu
- Yedikonuk İlkokulu
- Yenierenköy İlkokulu
- Ziyamet İlkokulu

==== Lefke District ====
- Doğancı İlkokulu
- Erdal Abit İlkokulu
- Gaziveren İlkokulu
- Lefke İstiklal İlkokulu
- Yedidalga İlkokulu
- Yeşilyurt İlkokulu

=== Other ===
- Bellapais School (Girne District)
- British Culture College (Lefkoşa District)
- Doğa International Schools (Girne District)
- Doğu Akdeniz Doğa İlkokulu (Gazimağusa District)
- Final İlkokulu (Gazimağusa District)
- Future Amerikan İlkokulu (Lefkoşa District)
- Girne Amerikan İlkokulu (Girne District)
- Levent İlkokulu (Lefkoşa District)
- Yakın Doğu İlkokulu (Lefkoşa District)
- Δημοτικά Σχολεία Ριζοκαρπάσου-Dipkarpaz Rum İlkokulu (Dimotika Scholeia Rizokarpasou/Rizokarpaso Primary School) (İskele District)

==== Secondary schools providing primary and pre-school education ====
- Necat British College (Girne District)
- The English School of Kyrenia (Girne District)
- TED Kuzey Kıbrıs Koleji (Lefkoşa District)

== Middle schools ==
This list includes active middle schools in Northern Cyprus. Middle schools provide the 3 years of the 12-year school education from year 6 to year 8.

=== Public ===
Public schools are owned by the state and governed by the Ministry of Education and Culture. There is no tuition fee for public schools.

- Atleks Sanverler Ortaokulu
- Bayraktar Türk Maarif Koleji
- Bayraktar Ortaokulu
- Canbulat Özgürlük Ortaokulu
- Çanakkale Ortaokulu
- Demokrasi Ortaokulu
- Dipkarpaz Recep Tayyip Erdoğan Ortaokulu
- Esentepe Ortaokulu
- Mehmetçik Ortaokulu
- Oğuz Veli Ortaokulu
- Şehit Hüseyin Ruso Ortaokulu
- Şehit Turgut Ortaokulu
- Şehit Zeka Çorba Ortaokulu

== High schools ==
For the extended list of high schools in Northern Cyprus, see list of secondary schools in Northern Cyprus.

== See also ==
- Education in Northern Cyprus
- Lists of schools
