= Institute of Marine Sciences, Middle East Technical University =

Research institute in Turkey

Institute of Marine Sciences
- Motto: Discover, apply, share!
- Parent institution: Middle East Technical University
- Established: 1975; 51 years ago
- Mission: To conduct fundamental research at the level of excellence in its region, in the seas of Turkey and the oceans.
- Focus: Marine Education
- Director: Prof. Barış Salihoğlu
- Faculty: 27
- Staff: 65
- Key people: Prof. Mustafa Yücel (Deputy Director); Asst. Prof. Devrim Tezcan (Deputy Director)
- Formerly called: METU Department of Marine Sciences (1975-1983)
- Address: P.K: 28, 33731
- Location: Erdemli, Mersin
- Coordinates: 36.5673°N 34.2553°E
- Interactive map of Institute of Marine Sciences
- Website: ims.metu.edu.tr

The Institute of Marine Sciences (Turkish: Orta Doğu Teknik Üniversitesi Deniz Bilimleri Enstitüsü) is a research institute at Middle East Technical University. Established in 1975, it is located on the university's Erdemli Campus in Erdemli, Mersin.

The institute's campus includes specialized laboratories, administrative buildings, computing and remote sensing resources, a library, an atmospheric tower, as well as facilities for housing staff and students. Additionally, the campus features a harbor to support research and fieldwork activities.

== History ==
The establishment of the Institute dates to December 1974, when Professor Warren Wooster from the University of Miami was invited to METU to discuss the creation of a marine sciences department. After a year of preliminary work, METU’s Board of Trustees approved the founding of the Department of Marine Sciences on December 21, 1974. Initially based in Ankara, the department was intended to relocate to Turkey’s southern coast once a permanent campus was completed, underscoring the need for coastal proximity in marine sciences research.

In 1975, it entered a collaboration with the Scripps Institution of Oceanography at the University of California. As part of the agreement, the Department obtained the designs and rights for the R/V Alpha Helix, which was later constructed in Turkey as R/V Bilim. The collaboration also included visits by Dr. William Nierenberg and Prof. Edward Goldberg , who contributed to academic and research activities.

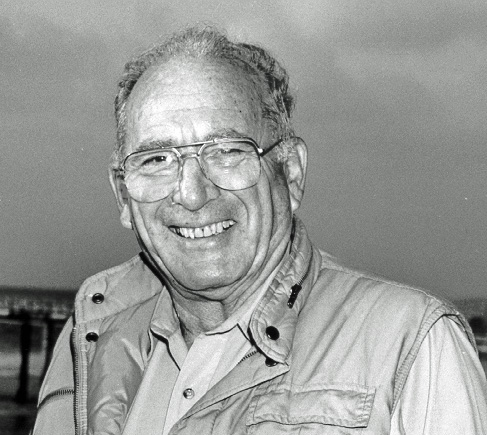
In July 1975, William Nierenberg, known for his work on the Manhattan Project and as director of the Scripps Institution of Oceanography, visited METU IMS. This visit initiated the transfer of crucial technology to IMS. Subsequently, all rights to the designs and plans for a future research vessel were transferred to METU. The vessel was named R/V Bilim and constructed in Turkey.

In the late 1970s, the Department took part in the United Nations Environment Programme’s Mediterranean Action Plan (MED-POL). It was designated as a national and regional activity center and conducted pilot studies on heavy metal pollution, chlorinated pesticides, PCBs, petroleum hydrocarbons, and ocean currents in the Mediterranean. During the same period, the Department moved to its permanent campus in Erdemli, Mersin, where it established laboratories, facilities, and research vessels, including R/V Erdemli and R/V Lamas. The construction of R/V Bilim, completed in 1984, expanded the Institute’s capacity for offshore research. These resources supported participation in research programs such as studies related to the Akkuyu Nuclear Power Plant and coastal oceanography projects.

During the 1980s, the Institute participated in the Physical Oceanography of the Eastern Mediterranean (POEM) project, coordinated by Prof. Allan R. Robinson of Harvard University. The project supported international collaboration and studies in physical and biochemical oceanography of the Eastern Mediterranean. In the 1990s, the Institute expanded its work to the Black Sea. Projects such as the NATO-supported TU-FISHERIES and CoMS-BLACK examined fisheries and ecosystem dynamics and involved cooperation among Black Sea littoral states.

== Location ==
Although the main campus of METU is located in Ankara, the Institute of Marine Sciences was established in Mersin, a coastal region along the Mediterranean Sea in Turkey. The institute is situated at 36°40′01″N 34°15′18″E in the town of Limonlu (historically known as Lamas) within the district of Erdemli. It lies approximately 10 kilometers (6.2 miles) from Erdemli and 47 kilometers (29 miles) from the city of Mersin.

== The infrastructure ==
The institute covers an area of approximately 0.66 square kilometres (0.25 sq mi) and is bisected by the Turkish state highway D.400, which connects Mersin and Antalya. The majority of the institute's buildings are located south of the highway, near the seafront. The northern section consists of Mediterranean scrub vegetation and an abandoned stone quarry, previously utilized during the construction of Mersin Harbor.

== Education ==
The institute is organized into four primary divisions: Chemical Oceanography, Marine Biology and Fisheries, Marine Geology and Geophysics, and Physical Oceanography.

Applicants to the programs are required to hold a Bachelor of Science degree or its equivalent in natural sciences or engineering. Additionally, candidates are expected to have a foundational understanding of subjects such as statistics, differential equations, and calculus.

== Research ==
The institute operates three research vessels to support its scientific activities. The primary vessel, RV/Bilim, with a capacity of 433 gross tons, is employed for extensive oceanographic research, including fisheries studies. In addition, the institute maintains two smaller vessels, the Lamas and the Erdemli, each 16 meters in length, which are utilized for daily research excursions in coastal regions.

== R/V Bilim 2 ==
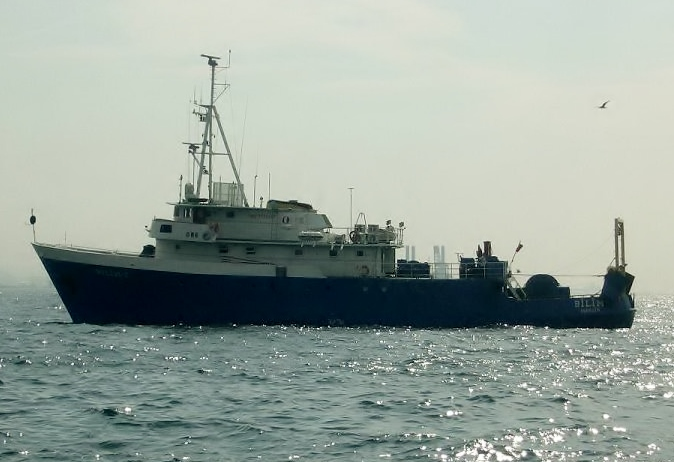
METU's RV/Bilim 2 in Bosphorus Strait during the Research Cruise, October 2006.

The primary research vessel of the Institute of Marine Sciences, R/V Bilim 2, was designed based on blueprints donated by the Scripps Institution of Oceanography, La Jolla, California, originally used for their R/V Alpha Helix. Constructed in Istanbul and launched in 1983, the vessel features a steel hull and specifications tailored for diverse marine research activities:

- Dimensions and Performance: Length: 40.36 m, Beam: 9.47 m, Draft: 3.80 m, Tonnage: 433 gross tons (190 net tons), Maximum Speed: 11.5 knots (21 km/h), Cruising Speed: 9.5 knots (18 km/h), Range: 6,500 miles (10,460 km).
- Propulsion: Powered by an MWM diesel engine with 820 hp (611 kW) and a variable-pitch propeller, managed by a Schafran bridge control unit. Fuel capacity: 120 m³.
- Navigation and Environmental Controls: Equipped with GPS navigation, conventional radar (60-mile range), central air conditioning, and heating systems.

R/V Bilim 2 accommodates a crew of 12 and a scientific team of up to 14 members for extended missions of approximately 45 days.

The R/V Bilim 2 is equipped to support multidisciplinary marine studies through a range of specialized instruments and equipment. For oceanographic measurements, data is collected using a Sea-Bird Model 9 CTD profiling system and a General Oceanics rosette sampler with 12 bottles of 5-liter capacity, both operated via a Lebus hydrographic winch fitted with a 2000-meter cable. Onboard analytical tools include an automatic Winkler titration system, an auto-analyzer, an in-situ spectrofluorometer, and an irradiance meter. The vessel is also well-equipped for fisheries and marine biology research, featuring a Norlau hydraulic trawl winch with a 7.5-ton capacity and 2 x 1500-meter wire, as well as a hydraulic net winch with a 6-ton capacity for biological sampling. Additionally, it supports marine geological investigations with an EG&G Uniboom shallow seismic system, side-scan sonars, corers, and a Mini Rover Benthos MK II underwater remotely operated camera for seafloor surveys. This combination of advanced equipment makes the R/V Bilim 2 a versatile platform for comprehensive studies in oceanography, fisheries, marine biology, and marine geology.

== See also ==
- Middle East Technical University
- Middle East Technical University Northern Cyprus Campus
- Scripps Institution of Oceanography
- R/V Bilim 2
