= List of secondary schools in Northern Cyprus =

This list of secondary schools in Northern Cyprus includes active academic institutions providing secondary education in Northern Cyprus by their types.

== Middle schools ==
For the extended list of middle schools in Northern Cyprus, see list of middle schools in Northern Cyprus.

== Public ==
Public schools are owned by the state and governed by the Ministry of Education and Culture. There is no tuition fee for public schools.

=== General high schools ===
These schools follow the national curriculum set by the Ministry of Education and Culture and prepare students for Yükseköğretim Kurumları Sınavı. All of the listed regular high schools have middle school sections if not stated otherwise. The schools admit students loosely from their feeder primary or middle schools in respect to their regions. High schools provide the 4 years of the 12-year school education from year 9 to year 12. The schools with middle school sections provide the 3 years from year 6 to year 8.

- Anafartalar Lisesi
- Bekirpaşa Lisesi
- Cumhuriyet Lisesi
- Değirmenlik Lisesi
- Erenköy Lisesi
- Kurtuluş Lisesi (Note: Kurtuluş Lisesi, Lefkoşa Türk Lisesi and Namık Kemal Lisesi do not have a middle school section.)
- Lapta Yavuzlar Lisesi
- Lefke Gazi Lisesi
- Lefkoşa Türk Lisesi
- Namık Kemal Lisesi
- Polatpaşa Lisesi

=== Maarif kolejleri ===
The following schools are modelled after Türk Maarif Koleji, providing the English curriculum and preparing students for the International General Certificate of Secondary Education and the GCE Advanced Level examinations. However, students are allowed to follow the Turkish curriculum from Year 10 if they choose to prepare for Yükseköğretim Kurumları Sınavı. The schools admit students achieving top scores from the Kolej Giriş Sınavları held during their senior primary school year. Maarif kolejleri provide the last 7 years of the 12-year school education from year 6 to year 12.

- 19 Mayıs Türk Maarif Koleji
- Gazimağusa Türk Maarif Koleji
- Güzelyurt Türk Maarif Koleji
- Türk Maarif Koleji

=== Anatolian high schools ===
The following schools are modelled after Turkish anatolian high schools and Turkish Cypriot maarif kolejleri. Bülent Ecevit Anadolu Lisesi (BEAL) provides both Turkish and English curricula and prepare students for Yükseköğretim Kurumları Sınavı, the International General Certificate of Secondary Education and the GCE Advanced Level examinations according to their preferences. Anadolu Güzel Sanatlar Lisesi (AGSL) only prepares students according to the Turkish curriculum, while training the students in fine arts at the same time.

BEAL admits students achieving top scores from the Yönlendirme Sınavı held after their year 8. AGSL admits students who successfully pass musical auditions prior to year 6 or year 9 and students who pass an art exam prior to year 9.

AGSL provides the last 7 years of the 12-year school education from year 6 to year 12, while BEAL only provides the last 4 years of the 12-year school education from year 9 to year 12.

- Bülent Ecevit Anadolu Lisesi

==== Anatolian fine arts schools ====
- Anadolu Güzel Sanatlar Lisesi

=== Science high schools ===
- 20 Temmuz Fen Lisesi

=== Vocational high schools ===
- Karpaz Meslek Lisesi
- Atatürk Meslek Lisesi
- Gazimağusa Meslek Lisesi
- Haspolat Meslek Lisesi
- Güzelyurt Meslek Lisesi

==== Technical high schools ====
- Sedat Simavi Endüstri Meslek Lisesi
- Cengiz Topel Endüstri Meslek Lisesi
- Dr. Fazıl Küçük Endüstri Meslek Lisesi

==== Commercial high schools ====
- Haydarpaşa Ticaret Lisesi
- Gazimağusa Ticaret Lisesi
- İskele Ticaret Lisesi

==== Divinity high schools ====
- Hala Sultan İlahiyat Koleji

==== Tourism high schools ====
- Girne Turizm Meslek Lisesi

== Other ==
All of the listed institutions also have middle school sections, providing the final 7 years of the 12-year school education from year 6 to year 12. Some of the following schools may also have pre-school and primary school sections.

- Doğu Akdeniz Doğa Koleji
- Εξατάξιου Γυμνασίου Ριζοκαρπάσου-Dipkarpaz Rum Ortaokulu (Exataxiou Gymnasiou Rizokarpasou/Rizokarpaso High School)
- Future Amerikan Koleji
- Girne Amerikan Koleji
- Levent Koleji
- Necat British College
- The English School of Kyrenia
- TED Kuzey Kıbrıs Koleji
- Yakın Doğu Koleji

== See also ==
- Education in Northern Cyprus
- Lists of schools
