= List of universities and colleges in Northern Cyprus =

A list of universities and colleges in Northern Cyprus. Northern Cyprus, officially the Turkish Republic of Northern Cyprus, is a state with limited recognition that comprises the northern portion of the island of Cyprus.

== Universities & Institutions that offer Bachelor's degree or above ==
Name	District	Since	Name in Turkish	Webpage	Type
Cyprus West University	Gazimağusa District	2015	Kıbrıs Batı Üniversitesi	cwu.edu.tr	Private
American University of Cyprus	Lefkoşa District	2014	Kıbrıs Amerikan Üniversitesi	auc.edu.tr	Private
Anadolu University Nicosia Campus	Lefkoşa District	1982	Anadolu Üniversitesi Lefkoşa Kampüsü	anadolu.edu.tr	Public – RoT
Arkın University of Creative Arts and Design	Girne District	2017	Arkın Yaratıcı Sanatlar ve Tasarım Üniversitesi	arucad.edu.tr	Private
Atatürk Teacher Training Academy	Lefkoşa District	1937	Atatürk Öğretmen Akademisi	aoa.edu.tr	Public
Bahçeşehir Cyprus University	Lefkoşa District	2017	Bahçeşehir Kıbrıs Üniversitesi	baucyprus.edu.tr	Private
University of City Island	Gazimağusa District	2016	Ada Kent Üniversitesi	adakent.edu.tr	Private
Cyprus Health and Social Sciences University	Güzelyurt District	2016	Kıbrıs Sağlık ve Toplum Bilimleri Üniversitesi	kstu.edu.tr	Private
Cyprus International University	Lefkoşa District	1997	Uluslararası Kıbrıs Üniversitesi	ciu.edu.tr	Private
Cyprus Aydin University	Girne District	2013	Kıbrıs Aydın Üniversitesi	cau.edu.tr	Private
Cyprus Social Sciences University	Lefkoşa District	2015	Kıbrıs Sosyal Bilimler Üniversitesi	kisbu.edu.tr	Private
Eastern Mediterranean University	Gazimağusa District	1979	Doğu Akdeniz Üniversitesi	emu.edu.tr	Public
European Leadership University	Gazimağusa District	2017	Avrupa Liderlik Üniversitesi	elu.edu.tr	Private
European University of Lefke	Lefke District	1989	Lefke Avrupa Üniversitesi	lefke.edu.tr	Public
Final International University	Girne District	2015	Uluslararası Final Üniversitesi	final.edu.tr	Private
Girne American University	Girne District	1985	Girne Amerikan Üniversitesi	gau.edu.tr	Private
International Business Management School	Lefkoşa District	2011	Uluslararası İşletmecilik Meslek Okulu	bms.edu.tr	Private
Istanbul Technical University TRNC Education-Research Campus	Gazimağusa District	2011	İTÜ-KKTC Eğitim-Araştırma Yerleşkeleri	kktc.itu.edu.tr	Public – RoT
University of Kyrenia	Girne District	2013	Girne Üniversitesi	kyrenia.edu.tr	Private
University of Mediterranean Karpasia	Lefkoşa District	2012	Akdeniz Karpaz Üniversitesi	akun.edu.tr	Private
Middle East Technical University Northern Cyprus Campus	Güzelyurt District	2005	Orta Doğu Teknik Üniversitesi Kuzey Kıbrıs Kampüsü	ncc.metu.edu.tr	Public – RoT
Near East University	Lefkoşa District	1988	Yakın Doğu Üniversitesi	neu.edu.tr	Private
Netkent Mediterranean Research and Science University	Lefkoşa District	2014	Netkent Akdeniz Araştırma ve Bilim Üniversitesi	netkent.edu.tr	Private
University of the West of Scotland	Lefkoşa District	2016	Batı İskoçya Üniversitesi, Kıbrıs	uwsincyprus.eu	Public – UK
International University of Alasia	Lefkoşa District	2019	Uluslararası Alasia Üniversitesi	alasia.edu.tr	Private

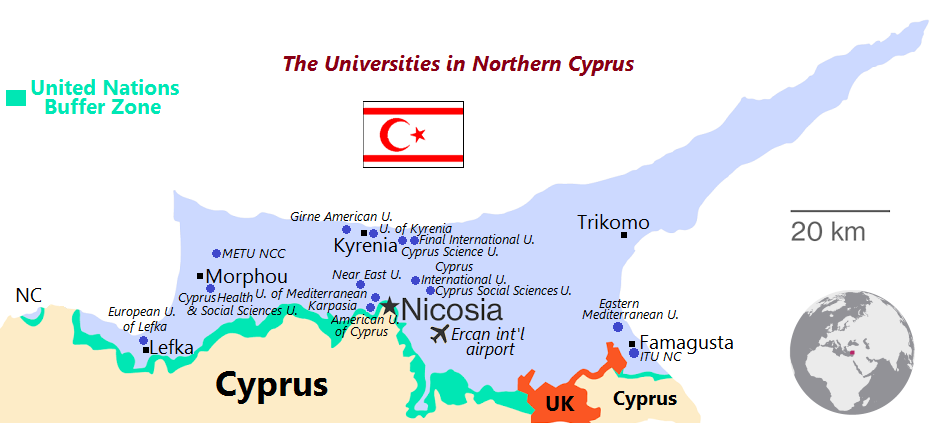
Map showing major universities

You can find the complete list of North Cyprus Universities on RocApply

== Colleges that offer higher education degrees below Bachelor's ==
Name	District	Since	Name in Turkish	Webpage	Type
Police School	Nicosia District	1969	Polis Okulu	polisokulu.gov.ct.tr	Public
Öngel Cosmetology College	Nicosia District	2006	Öngel Kozmetoloji Koleji	ongelkolej.com	Private
