= RV Bilim-2 =

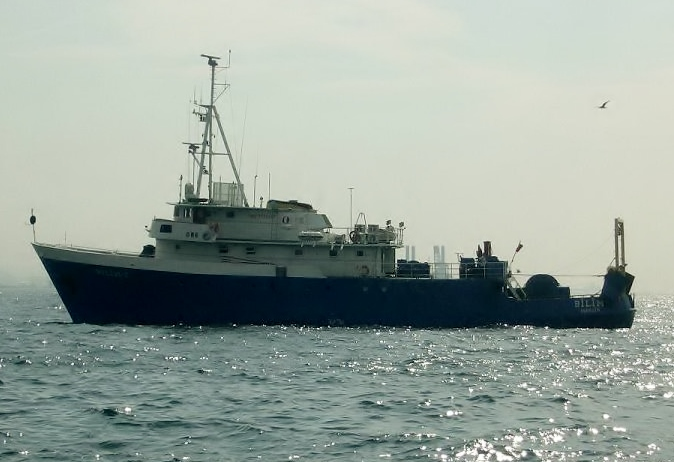
- RV Bilim-2 in Bosphorus (2006).

History

Turkey
- Name: Bilim-2
- Owner: Middle East Technical University, Ankara, Turkey
- Operator: Institute of Marine Sciences
- Builder: Istanbul Naval Shipyard, Pendik, Istanbul, Turkey
- Launched: 1983
- Homeport: Erdemli, Mersin, Turkey
- Identification: IMO number: 7729667; MMSI number: 271008504; ICS TCBU3
- Status: Active

General characteristics
- Class & type: 100-A-1.1-Nav IL; Ap; ST
- Tonnage: 433 GT; 500 DWT; 190 NT
- Length: 40.36 m (132 ft 5 in)
- Beam: 9.47 m (31 ft 1 in)
- Draft: 3.80 m (12 ft 6 in)
- Installed power: 611 kW (819 hp)
- Propulsion: MWM GmbH Diesel engine and variable-pitch propeller
- Speed: 9.5 knots (17.6 km/h) (service); 11.5 knots (21.3 km/h) (max.)
- Range: 5,600 nautical miles (6,400 mi; 10,400 km)
- Crew: 12 and 14 scientists
- Armament: None

The RV Bilim-2 is a Turkish research vessel owned by the Middle East Technical University in Ankara and operated in deep waters by its Institute of Marine Sciences based in Erdemli, Mersin, Turkey.

She was built by Istanbul Naval Shipyard in Pendik, Istanbul and launched in 1983 as RV Bilim (Turkish for "Science"). In 2006, she was renamed Bilim-2. She is the institute's main ship beside its two other smaller wooden-hull research boats, the 1979-built RV Erdemli and the 1981-built RV Lamas-1.

Bilim-2 is equipped with a hydraulic trawl winch of 7.5 tonnes and 2 x 1,500 m (4,900 ft) wire capacity and a hydraulic net winch of 6-tonne capacity for fisheries and marine biological investigations. Marine geological studies are conducted using a shallow seismic system of type EG&G Uniboom, side-scan sonars, and various corers. A remotely operated underwater camera (Mini Rover Benthos MK II) is also utilized in seafloor surveys.

== Characteristics ==
=== Vessel ===
Bilim-2 is 40.36 m (132 ft 5 in) long, with a beam of 9.47 m (31 ft 1 in) and a max. draft of 3.80 m (12 ft 6 in). Assessed at 433 GT, 500 DWT and 190 NT, the ship is propelled by a 611.5 kW (820.0 hp) diesel engine of MWM GmbH and variable-pitch propeller. She has a top speed of 11.5 knots (21.3 km/h) with 9.5 knots (17.6 km/h) in service. The vessel has a range of 5,600 nautical miles (6,400 mi; 10,400 km).

The vessel has a global positioning system (GPS), a conventional radar with a range of 52 nautical miles (60 mi; 96 km) for navigation and modern communication equipment. The ship has twelve crew, and can host up to fourteen scientists aboard. She can sail autonomously 45 days at sea.

Her home port is Erdemli in Mersin Province, southern Turkey. However, efforts are underway to allow her mooring directly at the quay before the institute in Erdemli.

=== Instrumentation ===
Operated by using a hydrographic winch with a cable, a CTD profiling system of Sea-Bird Model 9 and a rosette sampler with twelve bottles each five liter of General Oceanics are used for gathering physical and chemical data from the sea. An automatic Winkler titration system, an AutoAnalyzer, a spectrofluorometer, an irradiance meter and various other instruments are available for chemical and nutrient analyses in the labs on board the vessel. Data collection and processing is carried out in the computer room.

== Service ==
In 2010, Bilim-2 was tasked by the Ministry of Food, Agriculture and Livestock with a project for "Acoustic determination of anchovy stock and establishing a continuous monitoring method" as part of the "National Fisheries Data Collection Program". For this study, she operated in Black Sea coast from İğneada in the west to Hopa in the east during the fishing seasons beginning in 2011.

Anchovy makes out about 60% of all fish caught in Turkey. In the 2011 fishing season, 200,000 tonnes of anchovy were caught while around 70,000 tonnes remained left in the sea. The fishing season for anchovy diminished in the last years to about one month in contrast to the same in the 1970s and 1980s when it lasted from November to May. Before the 2000s, the anchovy stock amounted to one-and-half million tonnes, according to experts.

== See also ==
- List of research vessels of Turkey
