= Diorios =

Diorios: Διόριος (Greek); Tepebaşı (Turkish)
- Village
- Location in Cyprus
- Coordinates: 35°18′20″N 33°3′15″E
- Country (de jure): Cyprus
  - District: Kyrenia District
- Country (de facto): Northern Cyprus
  - District: Girne District

Population (2011)
  - Total: 774
- Time zone: UTC+2 (EET)
  - Summer (DST): UTC+3 (EEST)

Diorios or Dhiorios (Greek: Διόριος, Turkish: Tepebaşı) is a village in the Kyrenia District of Cyprus, 2 km west of Myrtou. It is under the de facto control of Northern Cyprus. Diorios is the second largest administrative area in the district of Kyrenia. Its administrative limits reach to the southern Nicosia-Kyrenia border. Most of the administrative area of the village is covered by dense pine forest, while in other areas sparsely vegetated land allows for the cultivation of cereals and carob and olive trees. The surrounding forest occupies an area of 8,400 acres, or 1,124.4 hectares. The village itself covers an area of 27,587 acres, or 36.9 square miles.

== Etymology ==
Various explanations for the name Diorios exist. One of them claims that the name was taken from the two kingdoms that existed in the region. Another claims that it is so called because it faces two hills (mountains). A third version notes that it owes its name from two streams that flowed to the ground, while a fourth says it was so named because it was, in ancient times and mythology, the hill of the father of the Olympian Gods, Zeus.

== Location and history ==
Diorios is located on the southern side of the plateau of Myrtou and is abutted by dense forests that spread throughout the village. It is adjacent to Mediterranean coastline that extends to villages such as Agia Eirini and Kormakitis. Diorios was an ethnically mixed village (Greek Cypriots and Turkish Cypriots) which has excellent views of the Bay of Morphou, the mountain of old Epia, the port of Xeros and ancient Solon. Diorios is known to date for the unique, red tulips. The vegetation of the Cyprus tulip «Tulipa Cypria» or "laledes" by the locals, where flourish in abundant quantities during the months of March and April, is characteristic of the region.

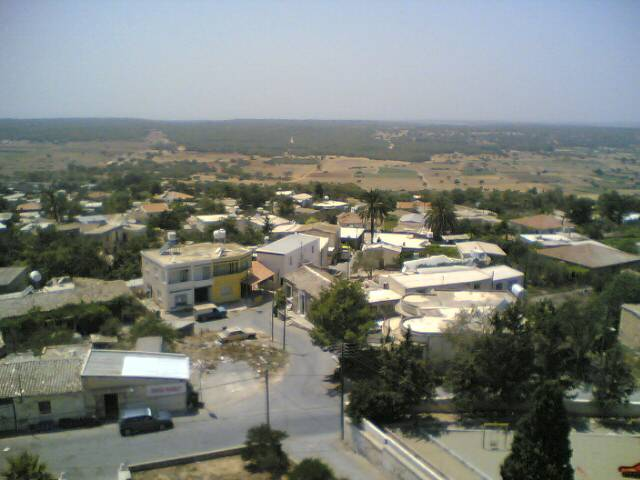
Diorios village

From a geological point of view, the administrative area of the village is dominated by sandstones, flysch of Kythrea and to a lesser extent, alluvial deposits, especially along the river basins of the region. On the deposits, were developed xerorentzines and territories terraroza. The average annual rainfall in the village area is reached by the homonymous state forest. In the remaining areas were before 1974 mainly cereals, carob and olive trees.

Diorios' population increased from 1881 until 1946. In 1881 the inhabitants numbered 387 and increased to 432 in 1891. In 1911 the inhabitants were 614 (402 Greeks and 212 Turks), while in 1946 amounted to 795 (517 Greeks, 271 Turks and 7 others). In the next census in 1956, a decrease of inhabitants numbered 622 (374 Greeks, 246 Turks and 2 others). Later there was increasing again in 1960 the villagers were 873 (514 Greeks and 359 Turks). The Turkish villagers abandoned it in 1964, because of the hostilities between Greek Cypriots and Turkish Cypriots. In 1973, the Greek population of the village numbered 600 inhabitants.

After the village was captured by Turkish troops during the invasion in the summer of 1974, many Turkish Cypriots returned to their village, and later many settlers from Turkey settled there under the Turkish plan for demographic change in the occupied areas of Cyprus. A few Greek Cypriots had remained trapped in their village after the Turkish invasion. They were only 16 people in October 1975 and they were forced to leave Diorios, following all the other Greek refugees. In September 1976 the last of the Greek villagers was expelled.

The village church is dedicated to Agia Marina and was built in 1850 over an older church. In 1973 worked the new church of St. Marina in another village location. The old church was damaged during the invasion of 1974 and is in ruins till now, the newer temple located in a military area said was used as a hospital. Other chapels of the village is St. John, Prophet Zachariah, St. Black, Prophet Elias, Archangel Michael, St. George (Mahania forest area), St. George (Trimithias area) of the Holy Cross, and Agiopetras St. Nicholas. In 2012, the Community Council-in-exile created an emblem for Diorios. Turkish Cypriots organize Tulip Fest each year.

== Gallery ==
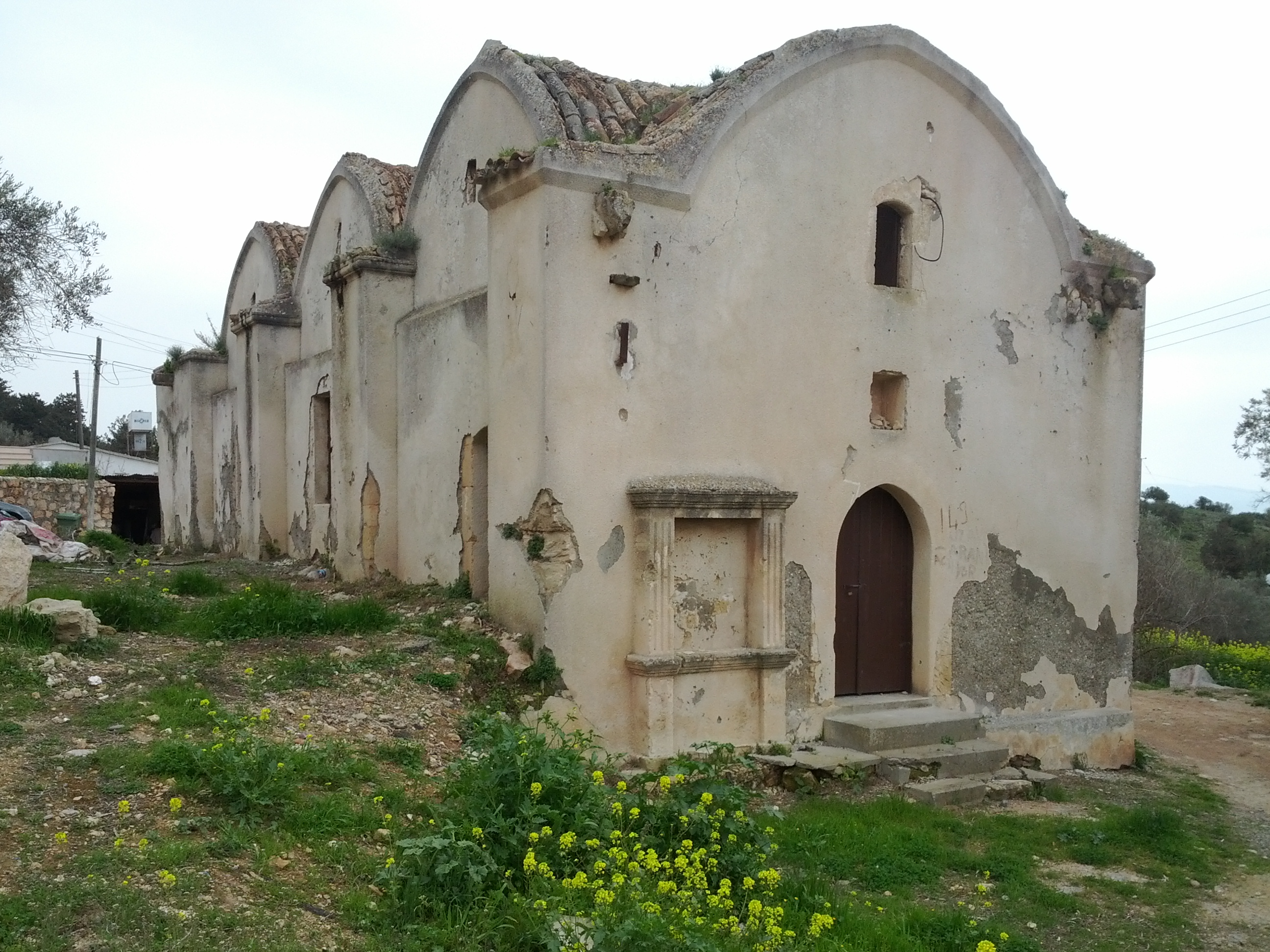
The façade of Agia Marina church

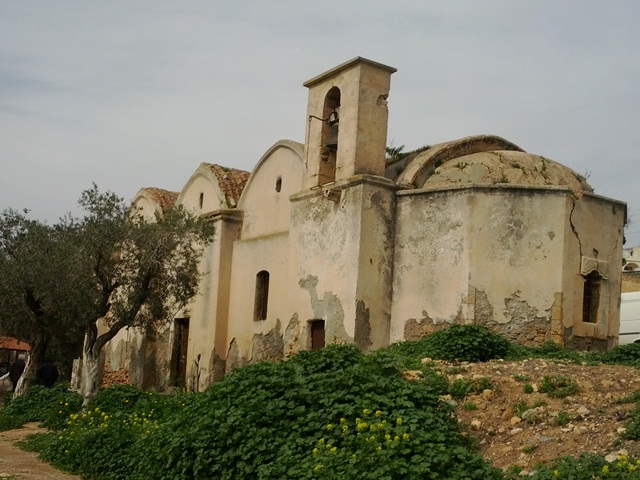
The anterior of Agia Marina church

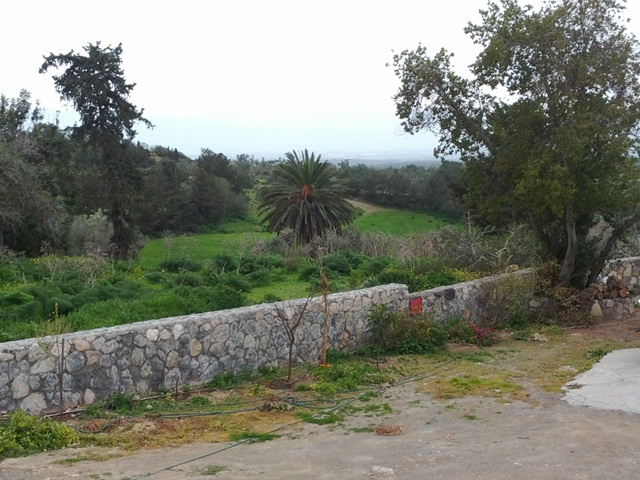
A view of Morfou gulf

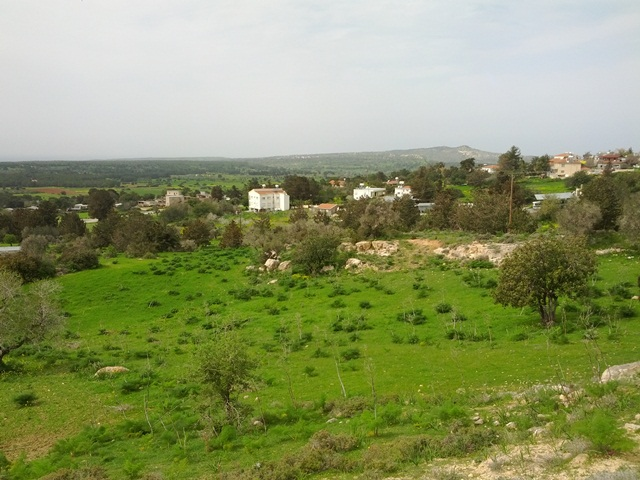
A view of Kormakitis from Diorios

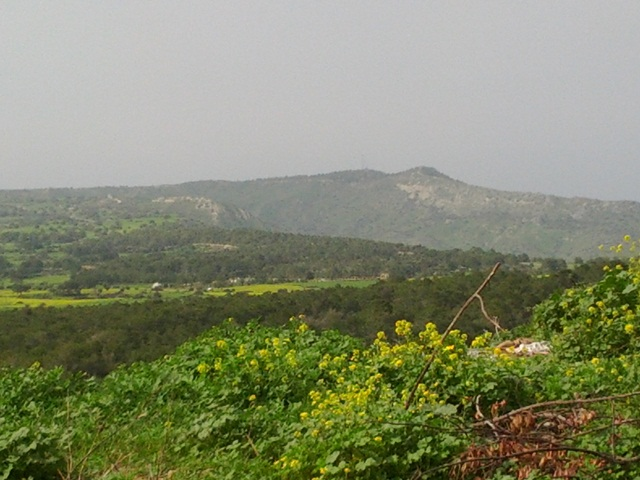
Characteristic Cypriot landscape
