= YÖDAK =

Higher education accreditation agency

- Yükseköğretim Planlama, Denetleme, Akreditasyon ve Koordinasyon Kurulu

Agency overview
- Formed: 2005
- Jurisdiction: Northern Cyprus
- Parent department: Ministry of National Education and Culture
- Website: yodak.gov.ct.tr/en

YÖDAK (Note: Turkish: Yükseköğretim Planlama, Denetleme, Akreditasyon ve Koordinasyon Kurulu, lit. 'Higher Education Planning, Evaluation, Accreditation and Coordination Council') is the accreditation agency for higher education in Northern Cyprus. It was established in 2005. The president of the agency is Aykut Hocanın.

YÖDAK is an affiliate member of the European Association for Quality Assurance in Higher Education.
