= Bahçeşehir Cyprus University =

Private uniuversity in Nicosia, Cyprus

- Bahçeşehir Kıbrıs Üniversitesi
- Type: Private
- Established: 2017
- President: Enver Yücel
- Rector: Prof. Dr. Mehmet Toycan
- Location: Nicosia, Turkish Republic of Northern Cyprus
- Language: English
- Website: https://baucyprus.edu.tr/

Bahçeşehir Cyprus University (Turkish: Bahçeşehir Kıbrıs Üniversitesi) is a private university established in 2017 in the city of Nicosia, Turkish Republic of Northern Cyprus.

== Academic units ==
=== Faculties ===
==== Faculty of Architecture and Engineering ====
- Computer Engineering
- Software Engineering
- Electrical and Electronics Engineering
- Industrial Engineering
- Civil Engineering
- Architecture

==== Faculty of Economics, Administrative and Social Sciences ====
- Banking & Finance
- Economics
- Business Administration
- Psychology
- Political Science and International Relations
- Social Work
- Management Information Systems

==== Faculty of Educational Sciences ====
- English Language Teaching

==== Faculty of Law ====
- Law

==== Faculty of Tourism ====
- Gastronomy and Culinary Arts
- Tourism and Hotel Management

==== Faculty of Pharmacy ====
- Pharmacy

Faculty of Health Sciences

- Nursing

=== Vocational Schools ===
==== Vocational School ====
- Computer Programming
- Business Management
- Civil Aviation Cabin Services

==== Vocational School of Health Sciences ====
- Anesthesia
- First and Emergency Aid
- Audiometry
- Medical Documentation & Secretarial Services

=== Schools ===
Foreign Languages and English Preparatory School

== Accreditations ==
The university is accredited by the Council of Higher Education of the Republic of Turkey and the Higher Education Planning, Evaluation, Accreditation and Coordination Council of the Turkish Republic of Northern Cyprus.

== See also ==
- Bahçeşehir University
- List of universities and colleges in Northern Cyprus
