= International Graduate School of English =

School in Seoul, South Korea

Coordinates: 37.52422°N 127.12960°E

- 국제영어대학원대학교
- Type: Private
- Established: 2002
- Location: Seoul, South Korea

The International Graduate School of English (Korean: 국제영어대학원대학교) is an educational institution in Seoul, South Korea.

There are two departments: English Language Teaching and ELT Materials Development. Both offer master's degrees. All regularly enrolled students in this school receive a tuition waiver. The school has a number of affiliated facilities, including its Teacher Training Institute, IGSE Library, IGSE Press, ELT Information Database, and ELT Research Institute. CELTA courses are also taught at the school. English is the medium of communication on the IGSE campus.
