= Cyprus Aydin University =

Coordinates: 35.3247°N 33.3448°E

- Cyprus Aydin University
- Type: Private University
- Established: 2013
- Rector: Prof. Dr. Yadigar İZMİRLİ
- Private university: Cyprus Aydin University
- Location: Kyrenia, North Cyprus
- Website: www.cau.edu.tr

Cyprus Aydin University (Turkish: Kıbrıs Aydın Üniversitesi) was founded in 2013 by the Özok company. It is accredited by YÖK, the Higher Education Council of Turkey; and YÖDAK, the Higher Education Planning, Evaluation, Accreditation and coordination Council of Northern Cyprus, but not by any international accrediting agency. Yadigar İzmirli is the Acting Rector.

== Campus ==
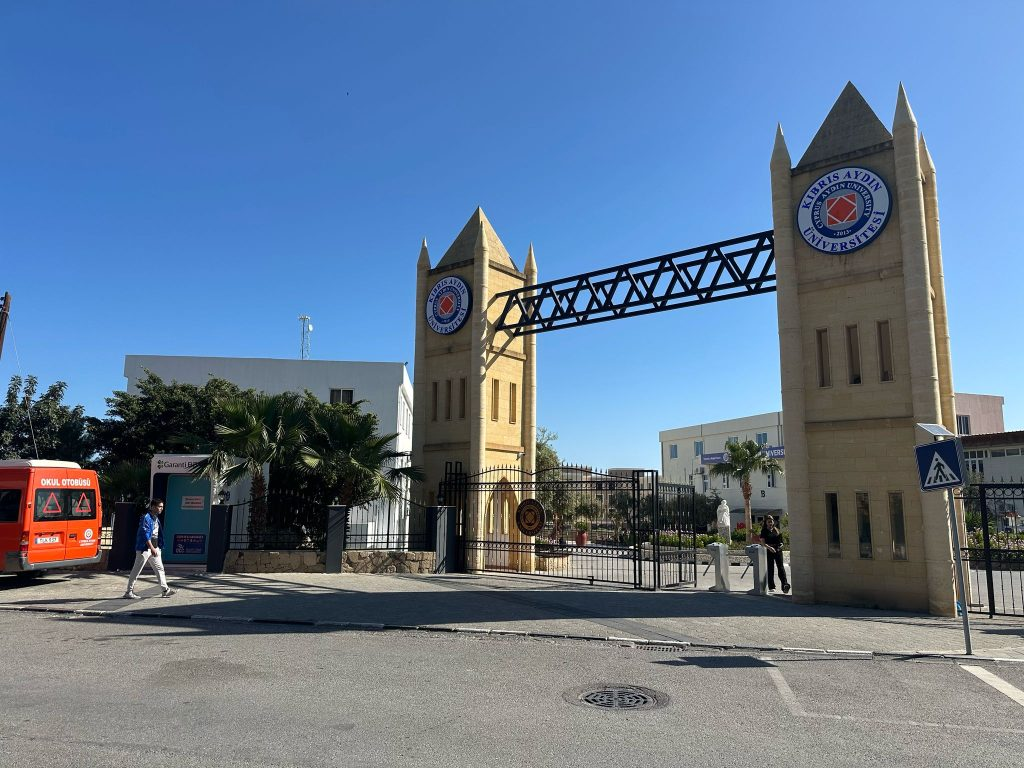

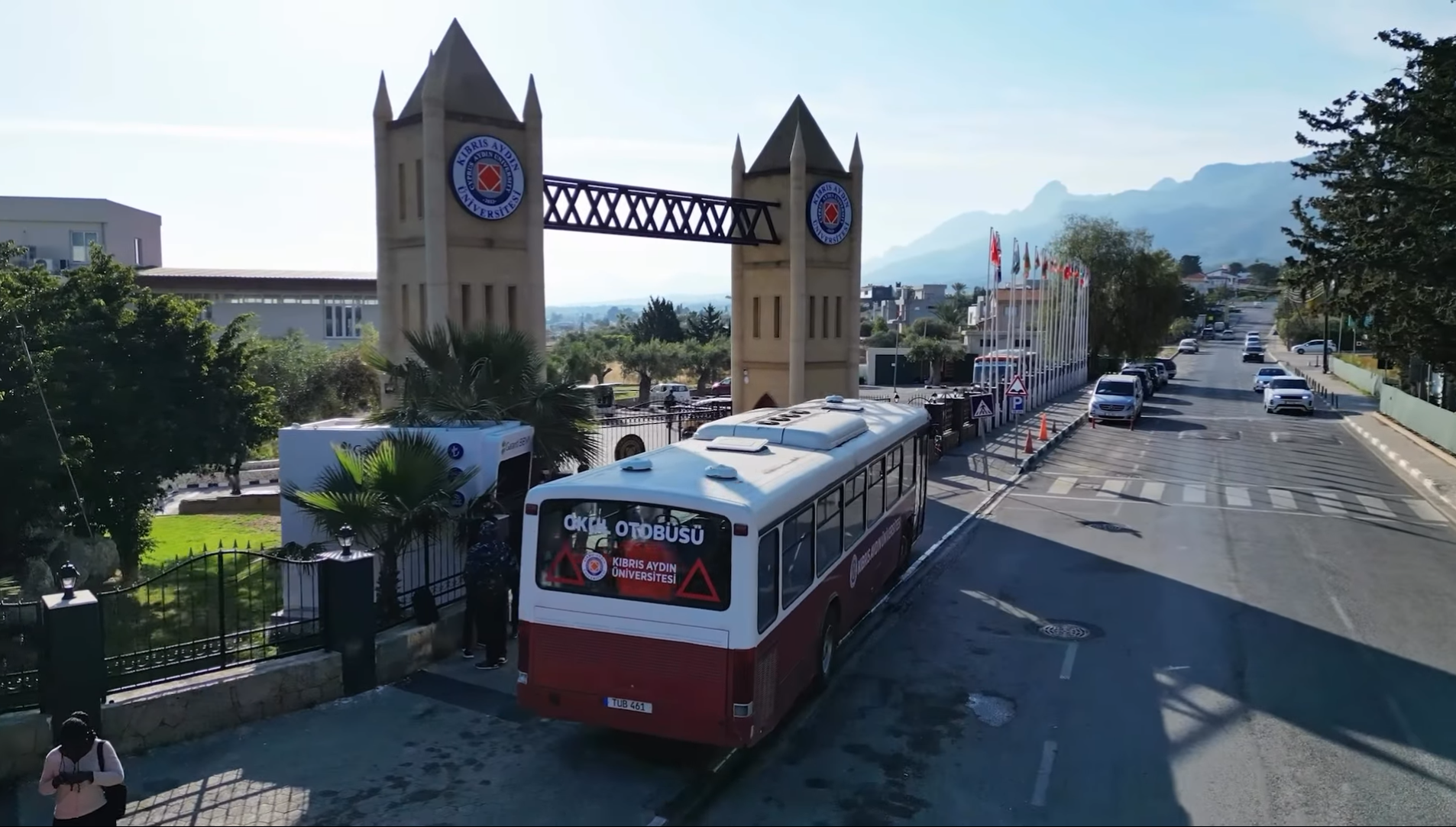

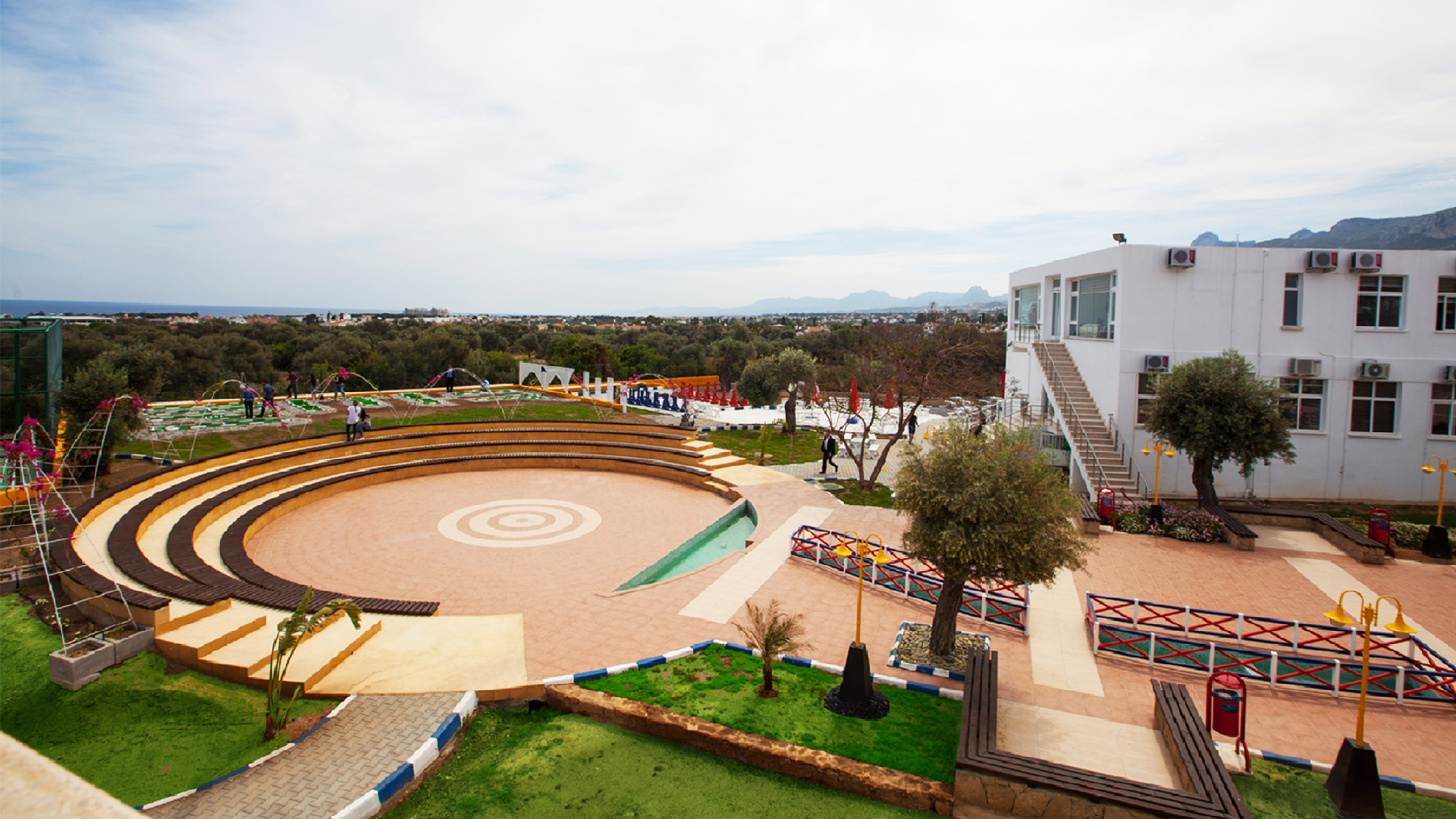

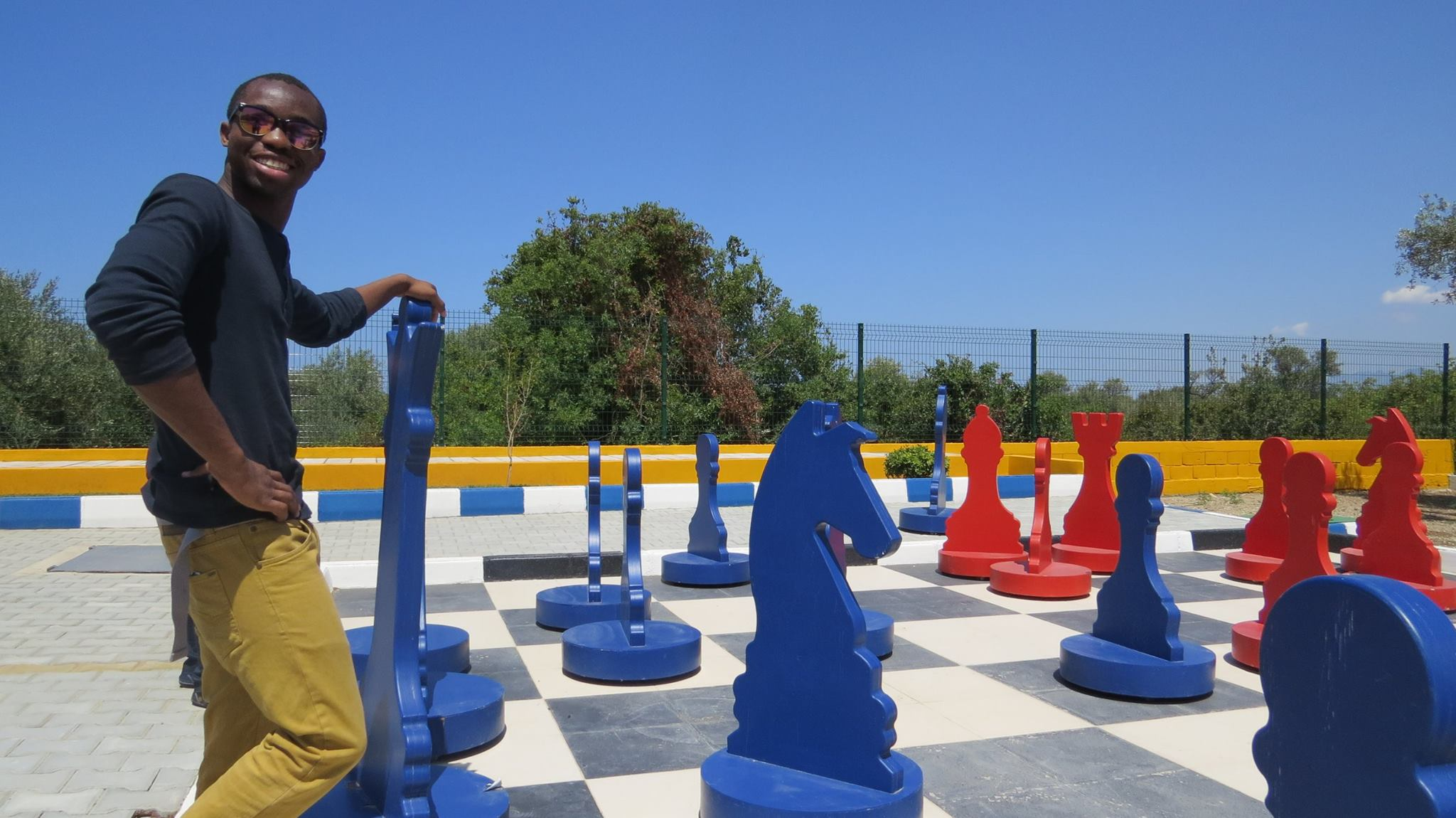

The campus is located near the city of Kyrenia, in the Kazafani (Ozanköy) area and consists of two buildings and a basketball court.

== Faculties ==
Faculty of Engineering

- Electrical and Electronic Engineering
- Mechatronics Engineering
- Computer and Software Engineering
- Software Engineering
- Information Security Engineering

Faculty of Economic, Administrative and Social Sciences

- Business Administration
- Civil Aviation Management
- Banking and Finance
- International Relations
- Psychology

Faculty of Law

- Law
- International law

Faculty of Educational Sciences

- Guidance and Psychological Counseling
- Special Needs Education
- Turkish Teaching

Faculty of Health Sciences

- Physiotherapy and Rehabilitation
- Nursing

Faculty of Fine Arts and Design

- Architecture
- Interior Architecture and Environmental Design

Faculty of Tourism

- Tourism and Hotel Management
