= English International School in Benin =

International school in Benin

English International School

Location
- Haie Vive; Cotonou, Littoral, 08BP0430; Benin
- Coordinates: 6.3574°N 2.3907°E

Information
- Type: Private - Primary, Infant and Selective Secondary
- Religious affiliation: Secular
- Founded: 2000
- Founder: Paul M. Collins
- Head teacher: Rebecca K. Carsky PhD
- Employees: >50
- Age range: 2 to 18
- Enrollment: 205
- Sixth form students: 12>
- International students: ~70%
- Average class size: 18
- Education system: British
- Language: English
- Houses: Newton, Einstein and Mandela
- Colours: Gold, red and white
- Accreditation: Cambridge International Examinations
- Website: https://www.eis-benin.org

The English International School is a private co-educational day school in Cotonou, Benin that was founded in 2000. It provides an international education using the English language as the language of instruction for pupils aged 3–18 years. It is one of over 10,000 schools established in over 160 countries that offer Cambridge International Examinations (CIE).

Students enrolled at the school, dependent on age, follow either the Cambridge Primary Programme assessed through Cambridge Primary Checkpoint, the Cambridge Secondary 1 Programme assessed through Cambridge Secondary 1 Checkpoint, the Cambridge Secondary 2 Programme assessed through CIE IGCSE examinations or the Cambridge Advanced Programme which is assessed through CIE A and AS level examinations.
