= University of Mediterranean Karpasia =

- Akdeniz Karpaz Üniversitesi
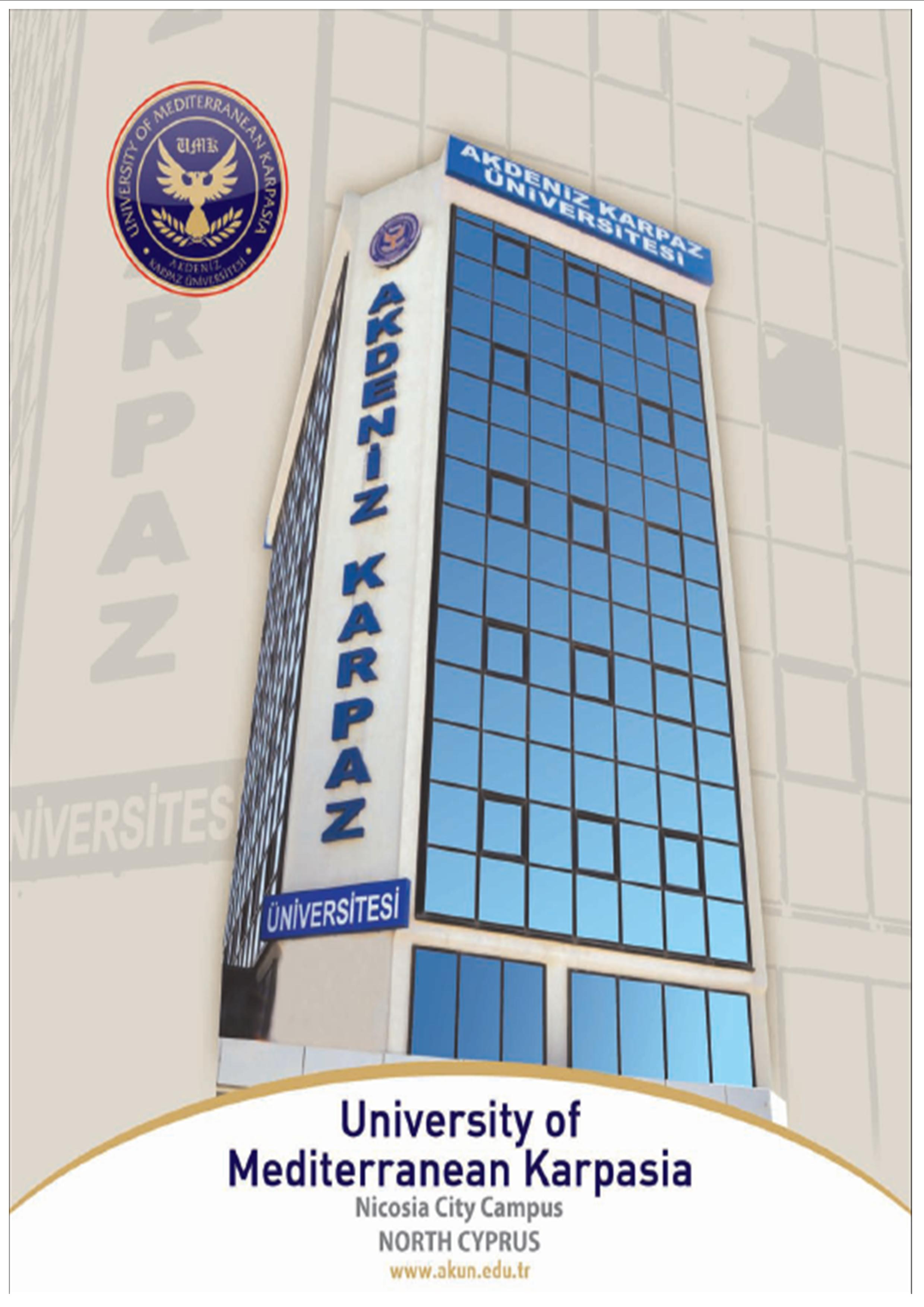
- Type: Private
- Established: 2012
- Rector: Prof. Dr. Ali ŞEN (Founder rector)
- Location: North Nicosia, North Cyprus
- Nickname: umk
- Website: www.akun.edu.tr

University of Mediterranean Karpasia (UMK; in Turkish: Akdeniz Karpaz Üniversitesi) is a private university founded in North Nicosia, Northern Cyprus in 2012.

The medium of instruction at University of Mediterranean Karpasia is English in most departments.

University of Mediterranean Karpasia has 4 Faculties and 1 School offering courses at undergraduate and postgraduate levels. An English Preparatory School is available for those who need to improve their English before starting to study at the specialist programs of the faculties.

The university's first graduation ceremony with 72 graduations was on 8 July 2015.

== Organization ==
=== Vocational Schools ===
- Vocational School of Karpasia

=== Faculties ===
- Faculty of Business
- Faculty of Air Transportation
- Faculty of Law
- Faculty of Tourism and Hospitality Management

=== Institutes ===
- Institute of Social Sciences

== Campus ==
The university is currently located into two city campus in North Nicosia, Northern Cyprus.
