= English School (Helsinki) =

Coordinates: 60.1936°N 24.8959°E

The English School
- Finnish: Englantilainen koulu

Location
- Mäntytie 14 (until sixth grade), Valimotie (grades 7–12); Helsinki; Finland

Information
- Established: 1945; 81 years ago
- Principal: Petri Vuorinen
- Grades: K–12
- Age range: 5–18
- Language: English, Finnish
- Website: engs.fi

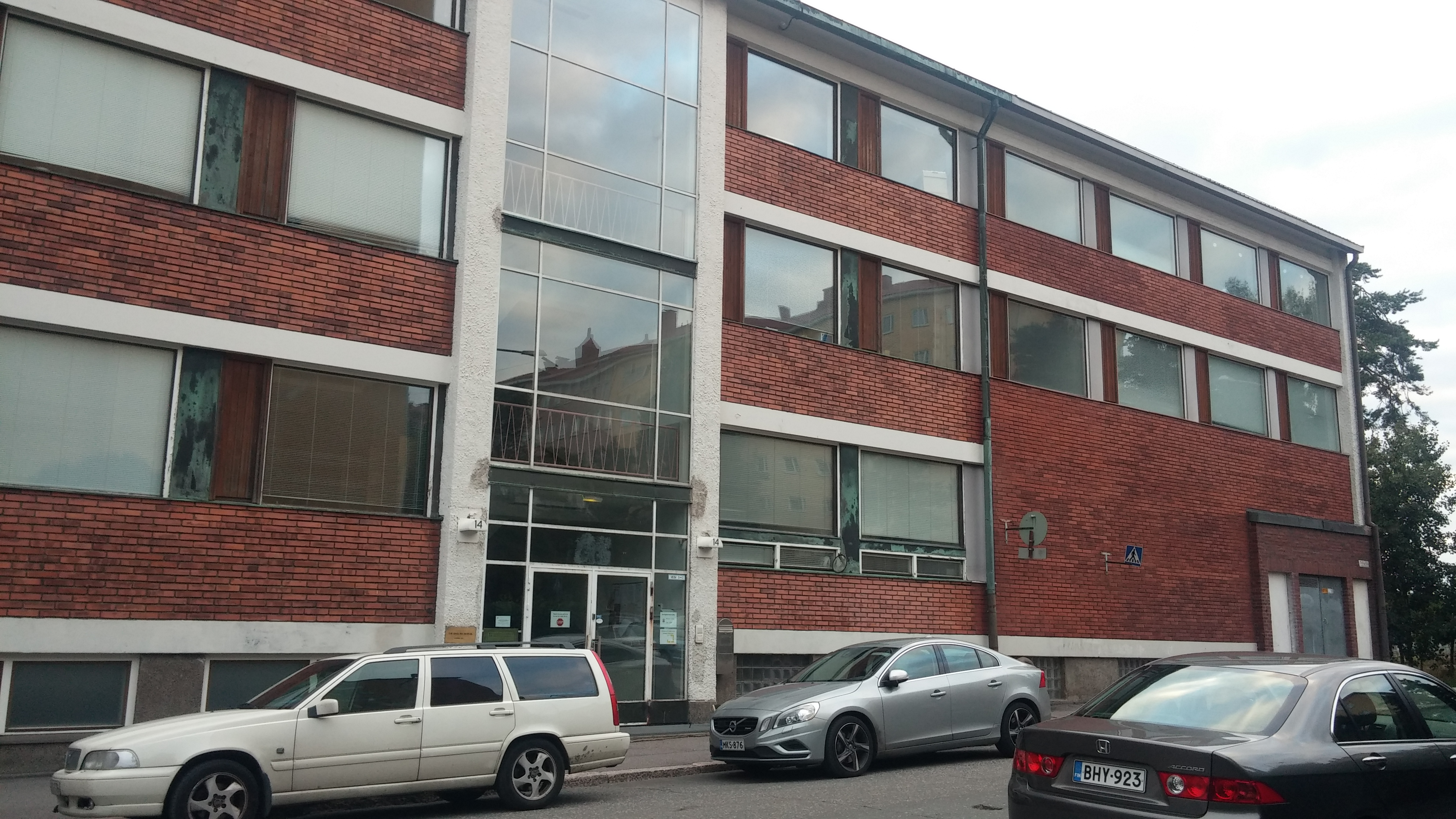
The English School of Helsinki in 2014

The English School (Finnish: Englantilainen koulu) is a private international school in Helsinki, Finland. Being a bilingual school, most of its students can graduate according to Finnish and English school systems in the time students in either country would normally study according to their own system only.

The school offers instruction in the form of a two year preschool/Kindergarten (ages 5–6), comprehensive school (grades 1–9) and high school (grades 10–12). The curriculum follows the national framework, but places a special emphasis on both the English and Finnish languages, allowing for students to be immersed in the use of both languages.

The school was founded by Catholic nuns in 1945.

== Accreditation and authorization ==
=== Accreditation ===
The English School primarily follows Finnish school system, but students can get international accretion through:

- Grade 9 – International General Certificate of Secondary Education (IGCSE)
- Grade 12 – Finnish Matriculation Examination. In other words, the normal high school ending test in Finland.
- Grade 12 – Scholastic Assessment Test (SAT). This is perhaps the most internationally accepted qualification on this level. In Finland, the Helsinki School of Economics accepts students also on the basis of high SAT scores.
- Grade 12 – Cambridge International Examinations (CIE). CIE qualifications are recognized for admission by UK universities (including Cambridge) as well as universities in the United States, Canada, European Union, Middle East, West Asia, New Zealand, India, Pakistan and around the world.

== Structure ==
The school is divided into following sections:

=== Preschool ===
- 5–6 years old

Most of the students know only their mother tongue: Finnish and do not know any English. There are tests which measure how ready the child is to enter preschool and about 20% are accepted. Special emphasis is in teaching English.

=== Classes 1–6 ===
- 7–12 years old

Preschool and classes 1–6 are located in same premises in Mäntytie 14, Helsinki. A bit over half of the studies are held in English and the rest in Finnish.

=== Classes 7–9 ===
- 13–15 years old

A bit over half of the studies are held in English and the rest in Finnish.

=== High school ===
The middle school (grades 7–9), and the high school (grades 10–12) are located in the same premises, which are currently in the Pitäjänmäki district of Helsinki.

== Extracurricular activities ==
In grade 6 students have a field trip to England.

One of the more notable activities is the chess club: in chess the school has been the most successful school in Finland on grades 1–9 during 2010–2013.

In 2013, the High School won an English debating tournament.
