= Middle East Technical University Northern Cyprus Campus =

- Orta Doğu Teknik Üniversitesi; Kuzey Kıbrıs Kampüsü
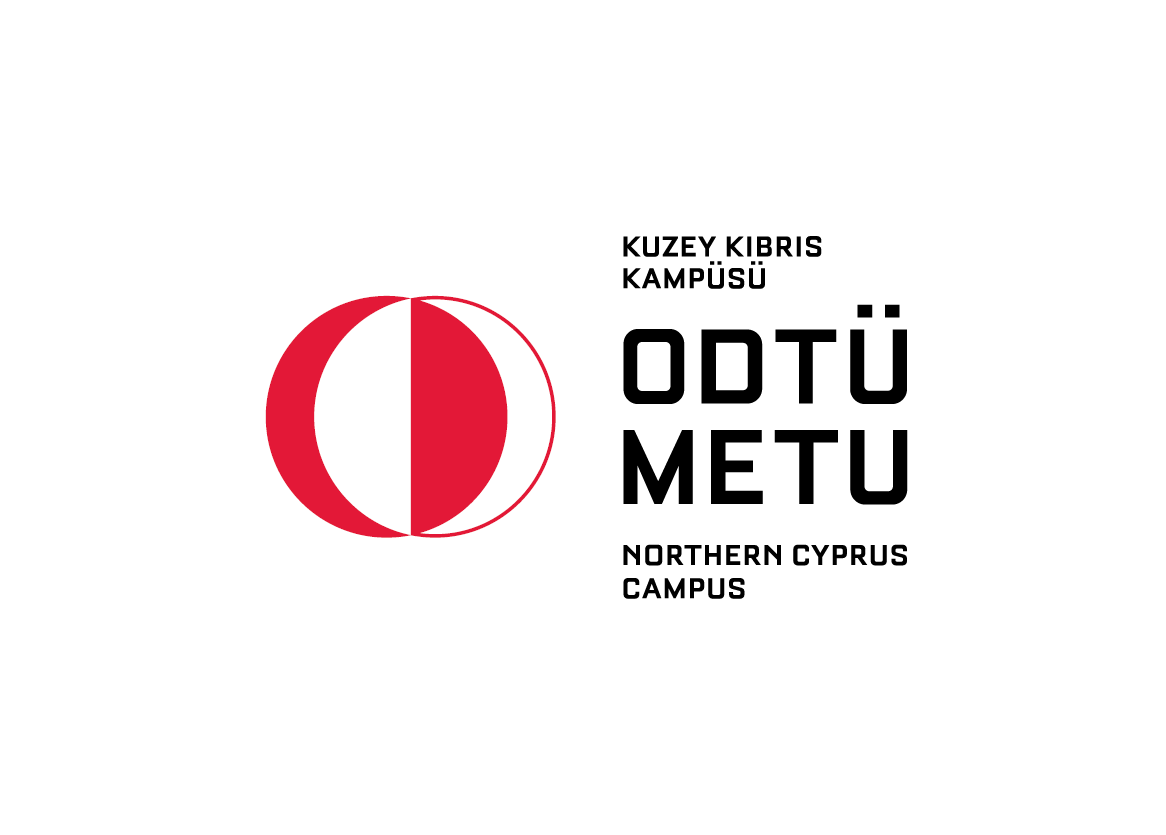
- Motto: Scientia Dux Vitae Certissimus (Latin)
- Motto in English: Science is the truest guide in life
- Type: Public
- Established: 2003; 23 years ago
- Parent institution: Middle East Technical University
- Affiliations: EUA; EAIE; IIE; ABET; SEFI; CIEE; CoHE; YÖDAK
- Rector: Prof. Dr. Ahmet Yozgatlıgil
- Acting Campus President: Prof. Dr. Cumali Sabah
- Faculty: 117
- Students: 3,150
- Location: Kalkanlı, Güzelyurt, Turkish Republic of Northern Cyprus
- Campus: Rural, 137 acres
- Language: English
- Other campuses: Ankara; Erdemli
- Colors: Red White
- Website: ncc.metu.edu.tr ncc.metu.edu
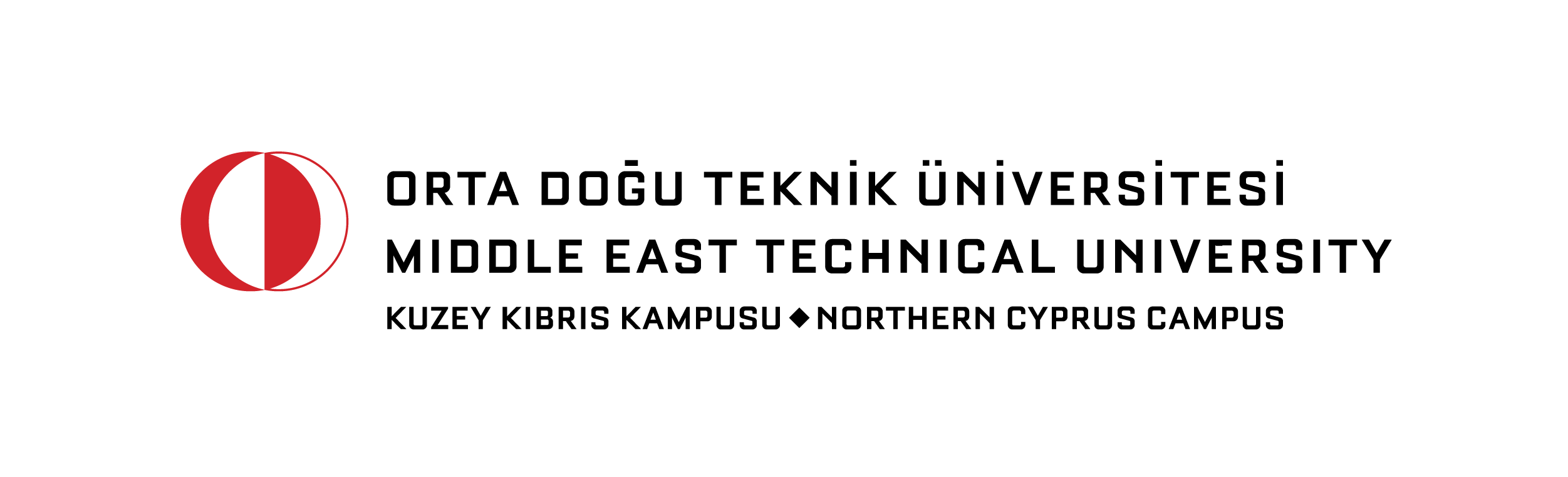

Middle East Technical University Northern Cyprus Campus (commonly referred as METU NCC; in Turkish: Orta Doğu Teknik Üniversitesi Kuzey Kıbrıs Kampüsü, ODTÜ KKK) is a public university campus in Güzelyurt, Northern Cyprus that was established as a result of an invitation conveyed to the Middle East Technical University in the year 2000 by the governments of Republic of Turkey and Turkish Republic of Northern Cyprus. It is a major higher education project financed by the Republic of Turkey, and serves both Turkish and international students. METU NCC enjoys full academic and administrative support of METU in Ankara.

METU NCC offers internationally accredited degree programs, including ABET, in engineering and social sciences. The medium of instruction is English. As of the 2023-2024 academic year, METU NCC offers 14 undergraduate programs, four graduate programs and 12 minor programs.

METU Northern Cyprus Campus is attached to the main campus in Ankara in all academic and administrative affairs. All degree programs of METU NCC are approved by the METU Senate, and provide the same quality standards of the main campus in Ankara. The METU NCC academic staff are recruited and promoted in accordance with the same criteria set forth by METU Senate and Administrative Board.

== Organisation ==
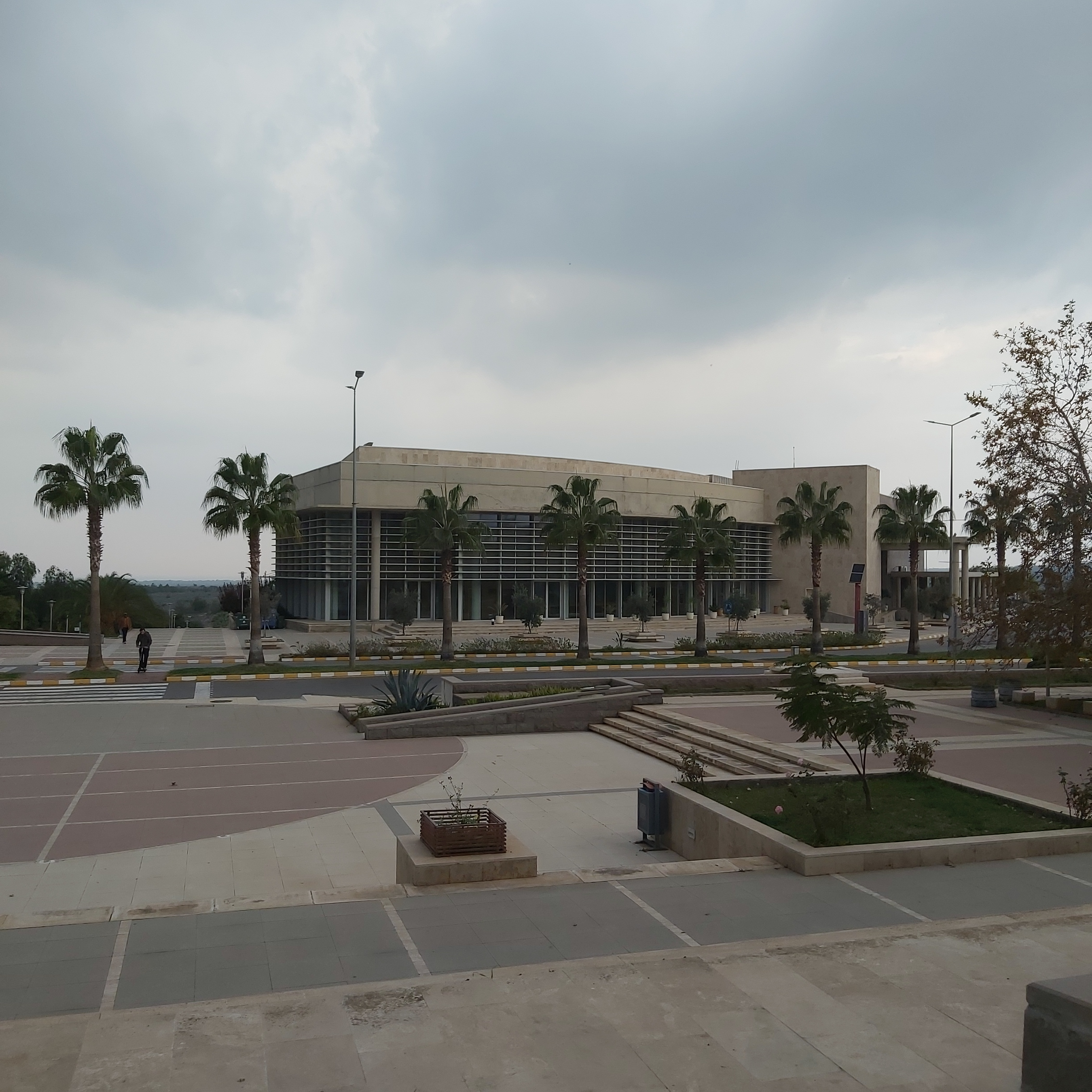
A view from the Middle East Technical University Northern Campus

METU has 14 undergraduate programs and 12 minor programs, most of which are organized into three faculties. These faculties are responsible for undergraduate education.

- Economic and Administrative Sciences: Business Administration, Business Administration International Joint Undergraduate Program with the State University of New York at New Paltz, Economics, Political Science and International Relations
- Education & Humanities: Guidance and Psychological Counseling, English Language Teaching, Psychology
- Engineering: Aerospace Engineering, Computer Engineering, Chemical Engineering, Civil Engineering, Cybersecurity Engineering, Electrical - Electronics Engineering, Mechanical Engineering, Petroleum and Natural Gas Engineering, Industrial Engineering, Software Engineering
- Minor programs: Digital Electronics, Data Science, Information Systems, Mechatronics, Engineering Management, Renewable Energy, Water Resources, Economics, Business Administration, Corporate Finance, Political Science and International Relations, Psychology, Research Groups in Mathematics, Physics, Chemistry
- Graduate programs: Sustainable Environment and Energy Systems, Electrical and Electronics Engineering, Computer Engineering, Mechanical Engineering

In addition to these, there are the Department of Basic English and the Department of Modern Languages in the School of Foreign Languages.

== Campus ==
METU Northern Cyprus Campus is built on an area of 339 hectares (137 acres), approximately 50 km west of Lefkoşa (Nicosia) and 6 km north of Güzelyurt (Morphou), a town with a population of 12,000. Today, METU NCC's features include the Cultural and Convention Center; Administration, Library & IT Center; dining hall; shopping center; Student Association rooms; dormitories; staff housing; fitness and wellness club; post office; book store; health & counseling center; sports complex; and an outdoor pool. The campus is designed to accommodate students with physical disabilities.

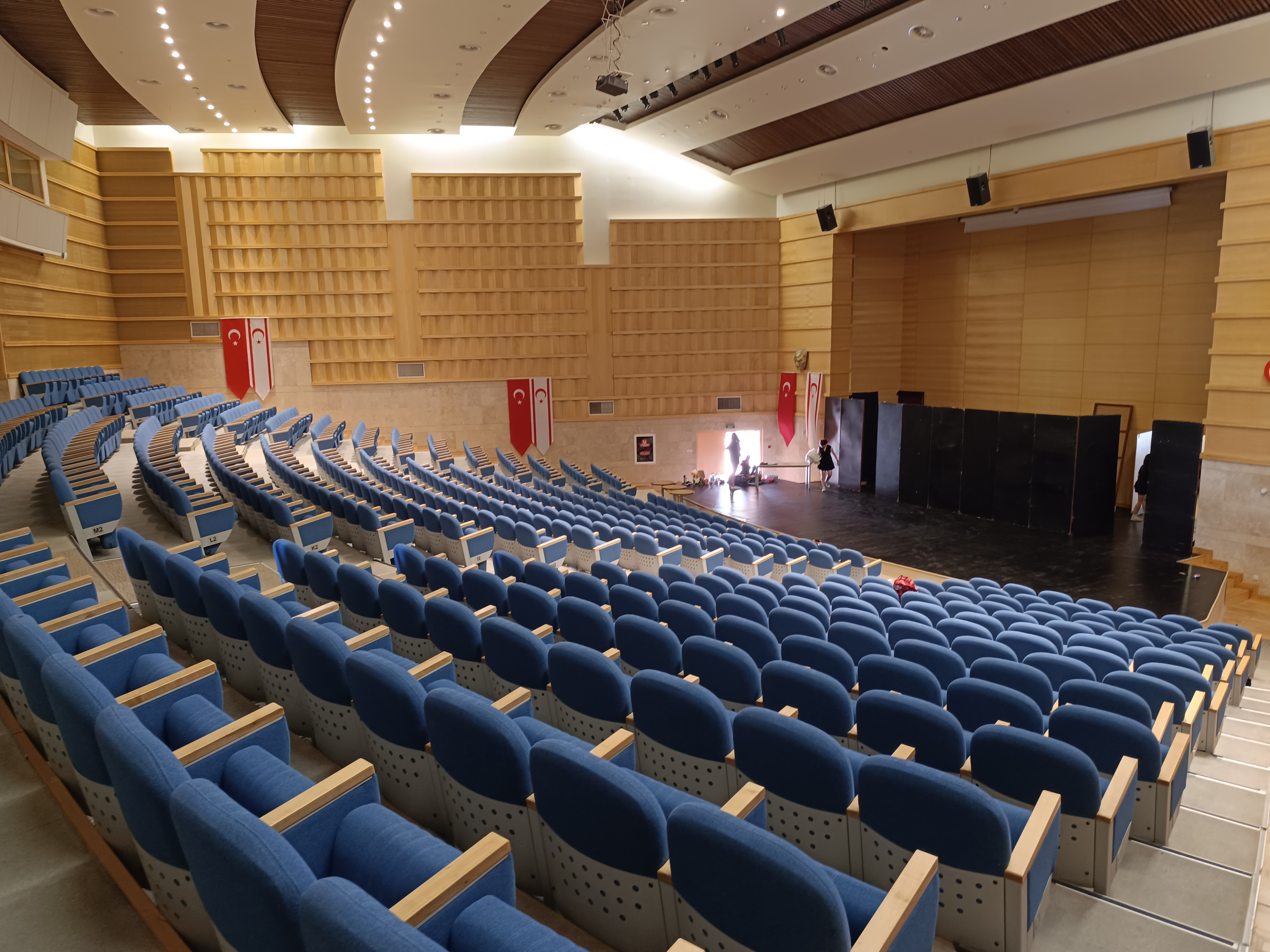
METU NCC Theater hall

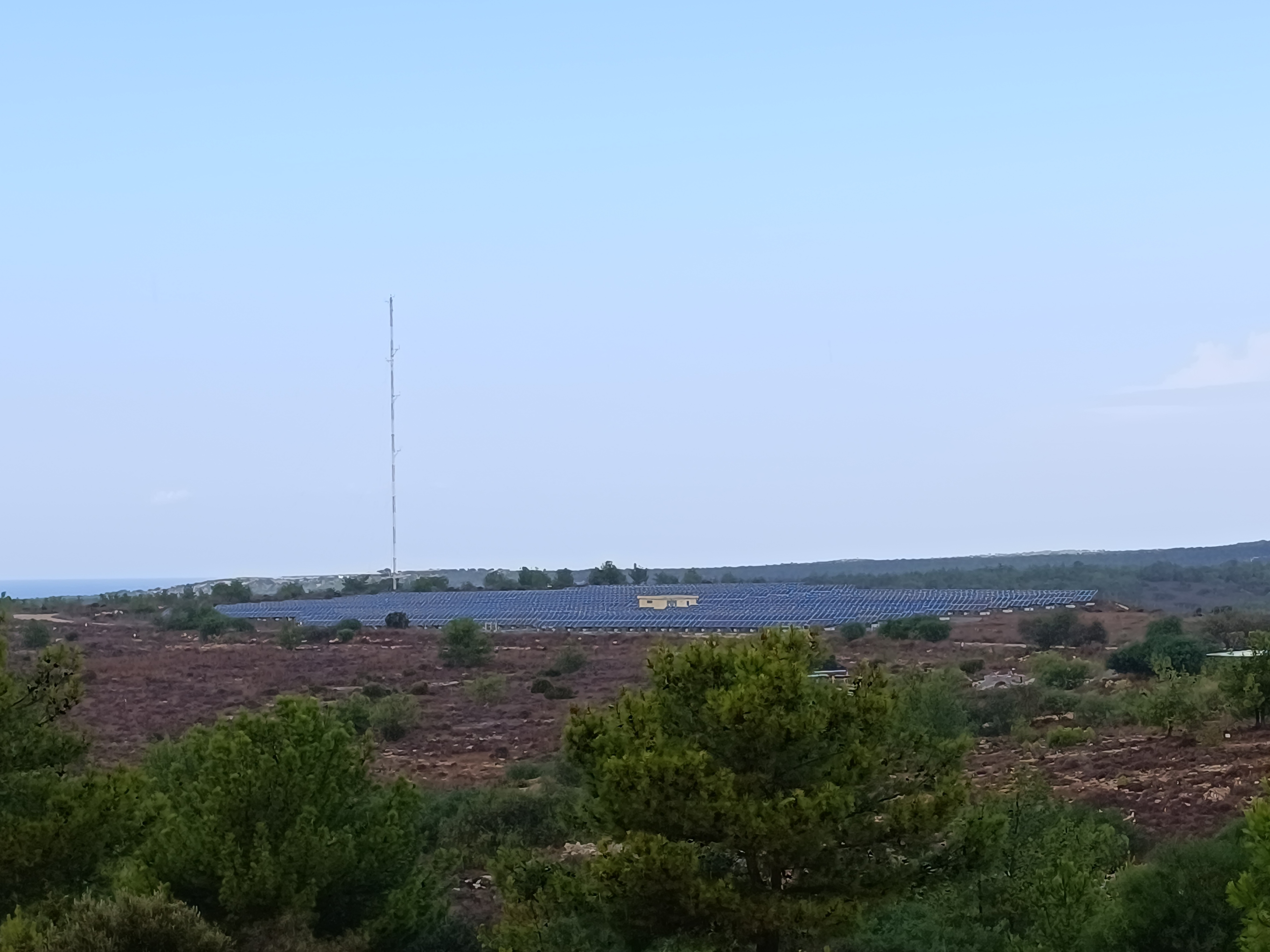
Solar panels at METU Northern Cyprus Campus

== Notable faculty ==
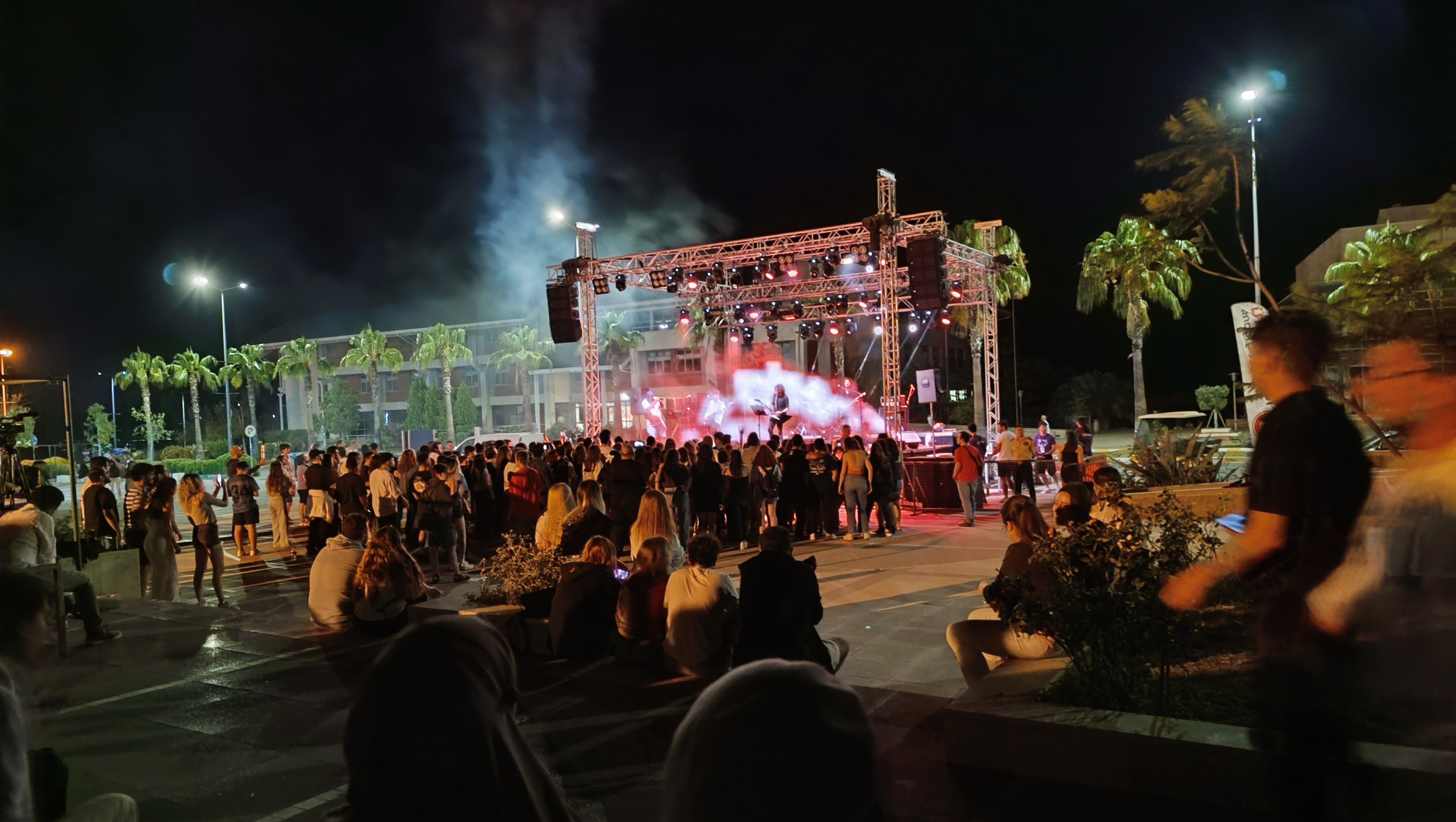
2024 Spring Festival at METU NCC

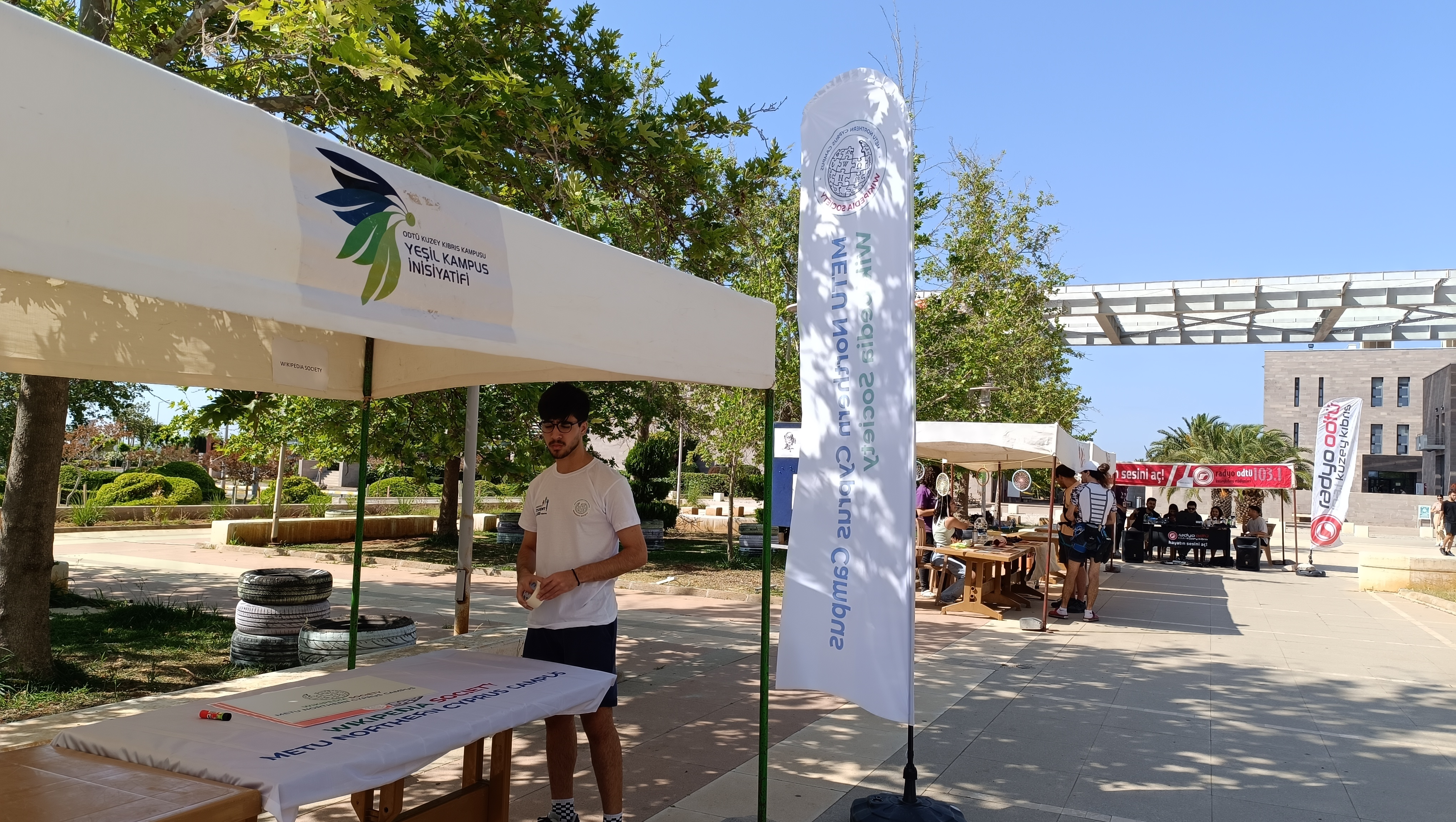
Student societies introductory event at METU NCC

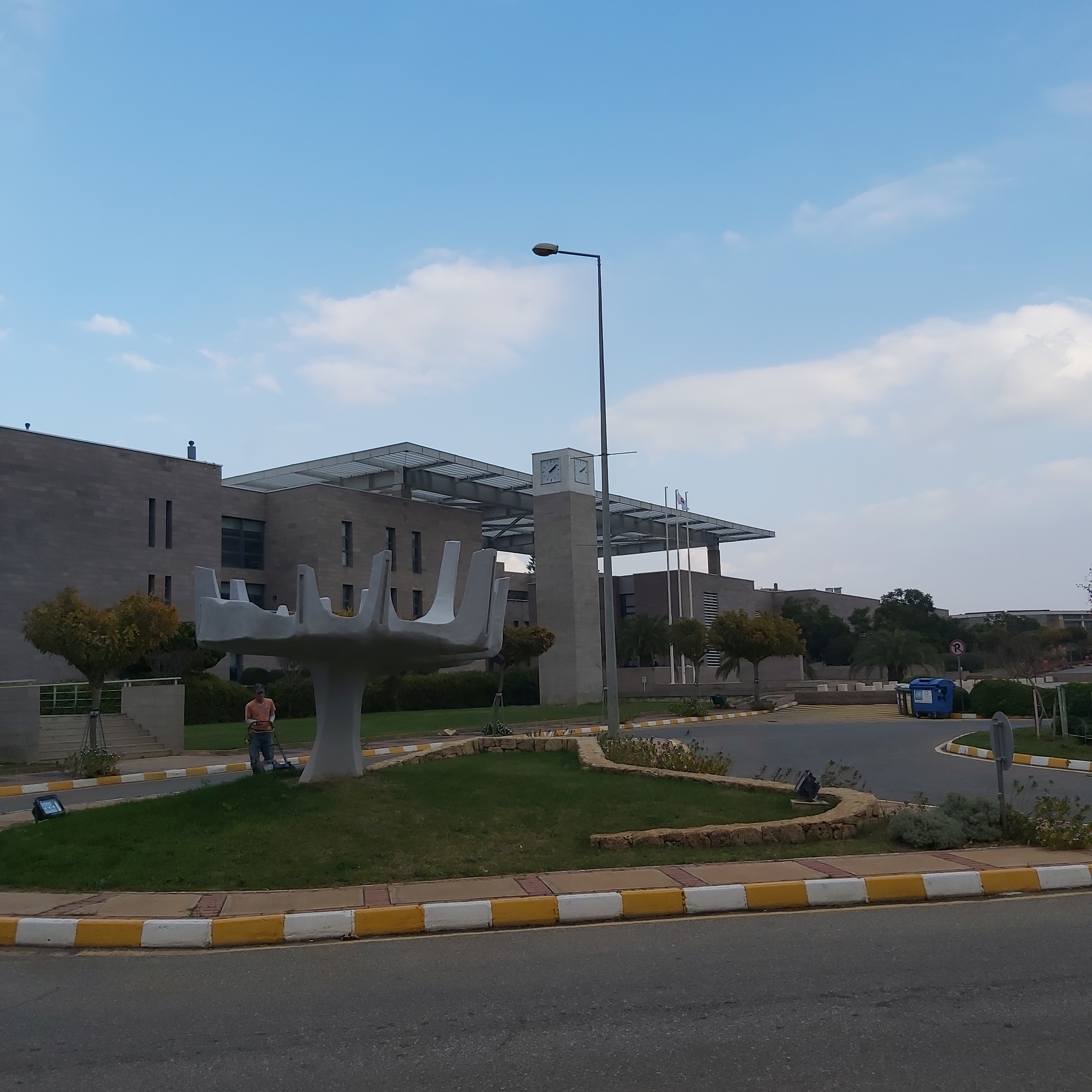
The Tree of Science statue at METU NCC

- Johannes Schleischitz, Assoc. Prof. Dr., Mathematics; M.Sc. Technical University of Vienna; Ph.D. University of Vienna
- Eşref Eşkinat, Prof. Dr.; Coordinator of Mechanical Engineering, B.S., M.S., METU; Ph.D., Lehigh University
- Çağrı Yalkın, Assoc. Prof, Business Administration; B.Sc. İTÜ, M.Sc. SUNY Binghamton, Ph.D. University of Warwick
- Gizem Morris, Lecturer; DVM Ankara, M.A. and Ph.D. University of Westminster, currently at King's Business School
- Fatih Tuluk, Lecturer, Economics; B.Sc. METU, M.A. Koç University, Ph.D. Washington University
- Defne Gönenç, Assoc. Prof.; B.Sc. METU, M.Phil. University of Cambridge, Ph.D. Geneva Graduate Institute
- Rafet Akgunay, Lecturer; B.Sc. METU, M.A. Fletcher School of Law & Diplomacy, Ph.D. METU
- Volkan Esat, Assoc. Prof. Dr; B.S., Gazi University; M.S., METU; Ph.D., Loughborough University
- Danyal Öztaş Tüm, Asst. Prof.; B.A. EMU, M.A. University of Texas at Austin, Ph.D. University College London
- Besime Erkmen, Asst. Prof.; B.A. EMU, M.A. University of Warwick, Ph.D. University of Nottingham
- Aslı Niyazi, Asst. Prof.; B.A. METU, M.Sc. University of Kent, Ph.D. London South Bank University
- Vahit Doğru Erdener, Assoc. Prof.; B.A. METU, M.Sc. and Ph.D. University of Western Sydney
- Barış Güngördü, Lecturer; B.Sc. University of London, M.Sc. Imperial College London, Ph.D. University of Nottingham
- Farjad Javidrad, Prof. Dr.; Ph.D. Imperial College of Science
- Mehrdad M. Sichani, Asst. Prof.; Ph.D. University of Arkansas
- Şükrü Erarslan, Asst. Prof.; B.Sc. CIU, M.Sc. University of Wolverhampton, Ph.D. University of Manchester
- Meryem Erbilek, Asst. Prof.; Ph.D. University of Kent
- Enver Ever, Prof. Dr.; B.Sc. EMU, Ms.C. and Ph.D. Middlesex University
- Mehmet Zeyrek, Prof. Dr., B.Sc., Ms.C. and Ph.D. at METU
- Muhammad Toaha Raza Khan, Asst. Prof.; Ph.D. Kyungpook National University
- Yeliz Yılmaz Yeşilada, Prof. Dr.; B.Sc. EMU, M.Sc. and Ph.D. University of Manchester
- Mustafa Erkut Özser, Asst. Prof.; B.Sc. Hacettepe, M.Sc. University of Southampton, Ph.D. Max-Planck Institute
- Mustafa Salih Okaygun, Lecturer, B.Sc. University of Petroleum & Minerals, Ms.C. and Ph.D. Texas A & M University
- Ali Şahin Taşlıgedik, Assoc. Prof. Dr.; B.Sc. and M.Sc. METU, Ph.D. University of Canterbury
- Abdullah Ekinci, Assoc. Prof.; B.Sc. and M.Sc. Coventry University, Ph.D. University College London
- Hüseyin Sevay, Asst. Prof.; B.Sc., M.Sc. and Ph.D. University of Kansas
- Canras Batunlu, Asst. Prof.; B.Sc. EMU, M.Sc. Leeds University, Ph.D. Manchester University
- Cem Direkoğlu, Assoc. Prof.; B.Sc. and M.sC. EMU, Ph.D. University of Southampton
- Murat Fahiroğlu, Prof. Dr.; B.Sc. Michigan State University, M.Sc. and Ph.D. University of Wisconsin-Madison
- Tayfun Nesimoğlu, Assoc. Prof.; B.Sc. EMU, M. Sc. University of Westminster, Ph.D. University of Bristol
- Volkan Esat, Assoc. Prof.; B.Sc. Gazi University, M.Sc. METU, Ph.D. Loughborough University
- Ali Atashbar Orang, Asst. Prof.; Ph.D. Sapienza University of Rome
- Gamze İpek, Asst. Prof.; B.Sc. İTÜ, M.Sc. and Ph.D. Louisiana State University
- Murat Sönmez, Assoc. Prof. Dr.; B.S., Ankara State Academy of Engineering and Architecture; M.S., Ph.D., METU
