= Filani =

Filani is a surname. Notable people with the surname include:

- Joel Filani (born 1983), American football player and coach
- Kunle Filani (born 1957), Nigerian educator and artist
- Mosun Filani, Nigerian actress
- Oyebanji Filani, Nigerian doctor and office holder

== See also ==
- Filan
- Politiko
