= Lapathus (Cyprus) =

Ancient city-kingdom of Cyprus and archaeological site

- Λάπαθος, 𐤋𐤐𐤔
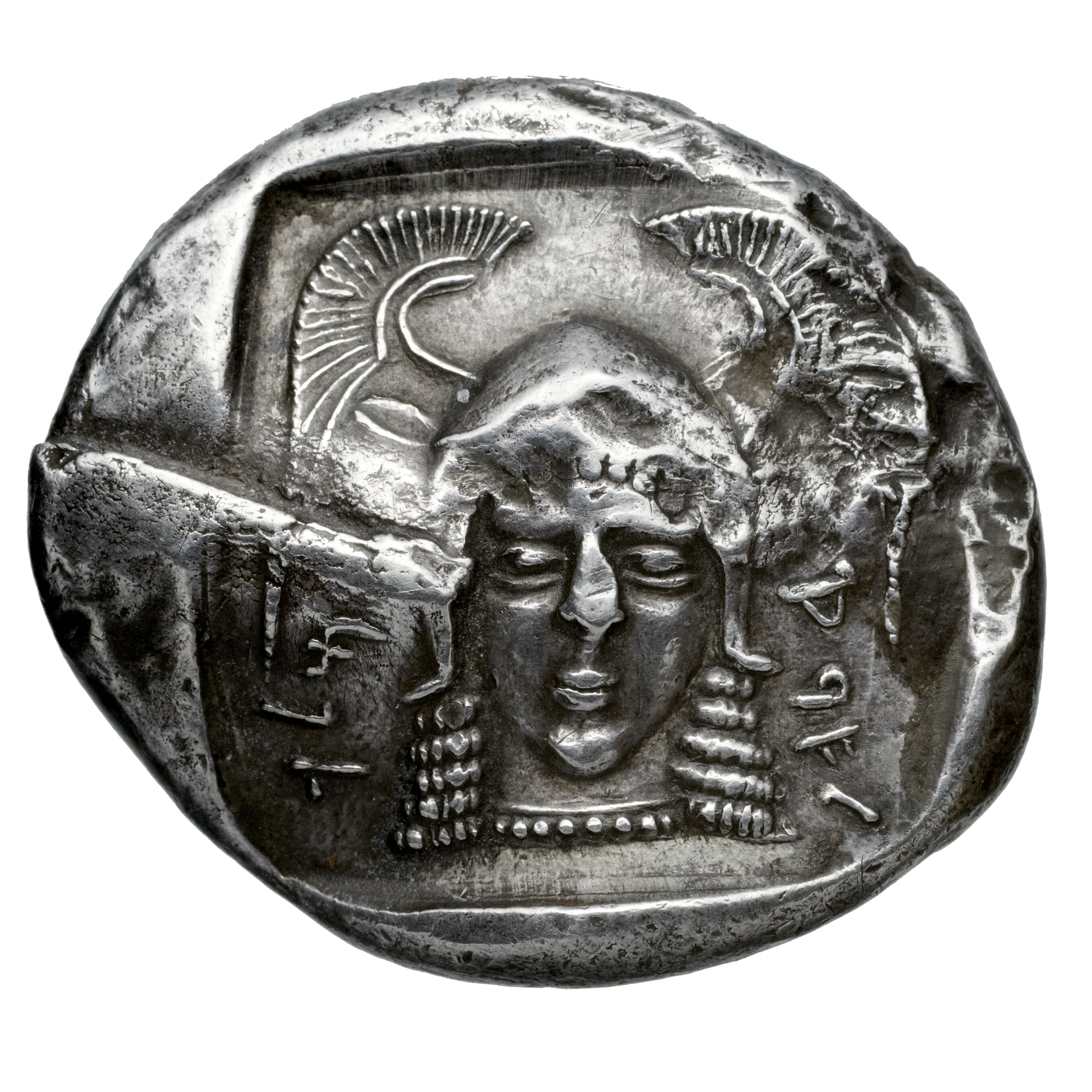
- A coins of ṣdqmlk, King of Lapathus

- Location within Cyprus
- 35°21′19″N 33°11′52″E
- Location: Cyprus

Lapathus, (Note: Phoenician: 𐤋𐤐𐤔, romanized: LPŠ; Ancient Greek: Λάπαθος, Lápathos) also recorded as Lapethus, (Note: Ancient Greek: Λάπηθος, Lápēthos) Lepethis, (Note: Ancient Greek: Ληπηθίς, Lēpēthís) and Lapithus, (Note: Ancient Greek: Λάπιθος, Lápithos) was an ancient Cypriot city-kingdom and town near present-day Lapithos and Karavas. Its origins were Phoenician and Greek.

== Name ==
Due to lack of evidence, researchers had not been sure whether the Phoenician name for the city was LPṬ (with Teth) or LPT (with Taw). Recent findings, such as inscriptions and coins with legends, provide the clear reading LPŠ. The Greek and the Phoenician name record, each in its own way, a phoneme of a language prior to them both.

== History ==
Map showing the ancient city Kingdoms of Cyprus

Pseudo-Scylax calls it a Phoenician city. Alexander of Ephesus states that Kition and Lapethos were founded by Belos. Strabo mentions that it was founded as a Spartan colony headed by Praxander. He adds that it was situated opposite to the town of Nagidus in Cilicia and possessed a harbour and docks. Nonnus claimed the name derived from an eponymous Lapathus, a follower of Dionysus. It was situated in the north of the island, on a river of the same name and in a district called Lapethia (Λαπηθία, Lapēthía).

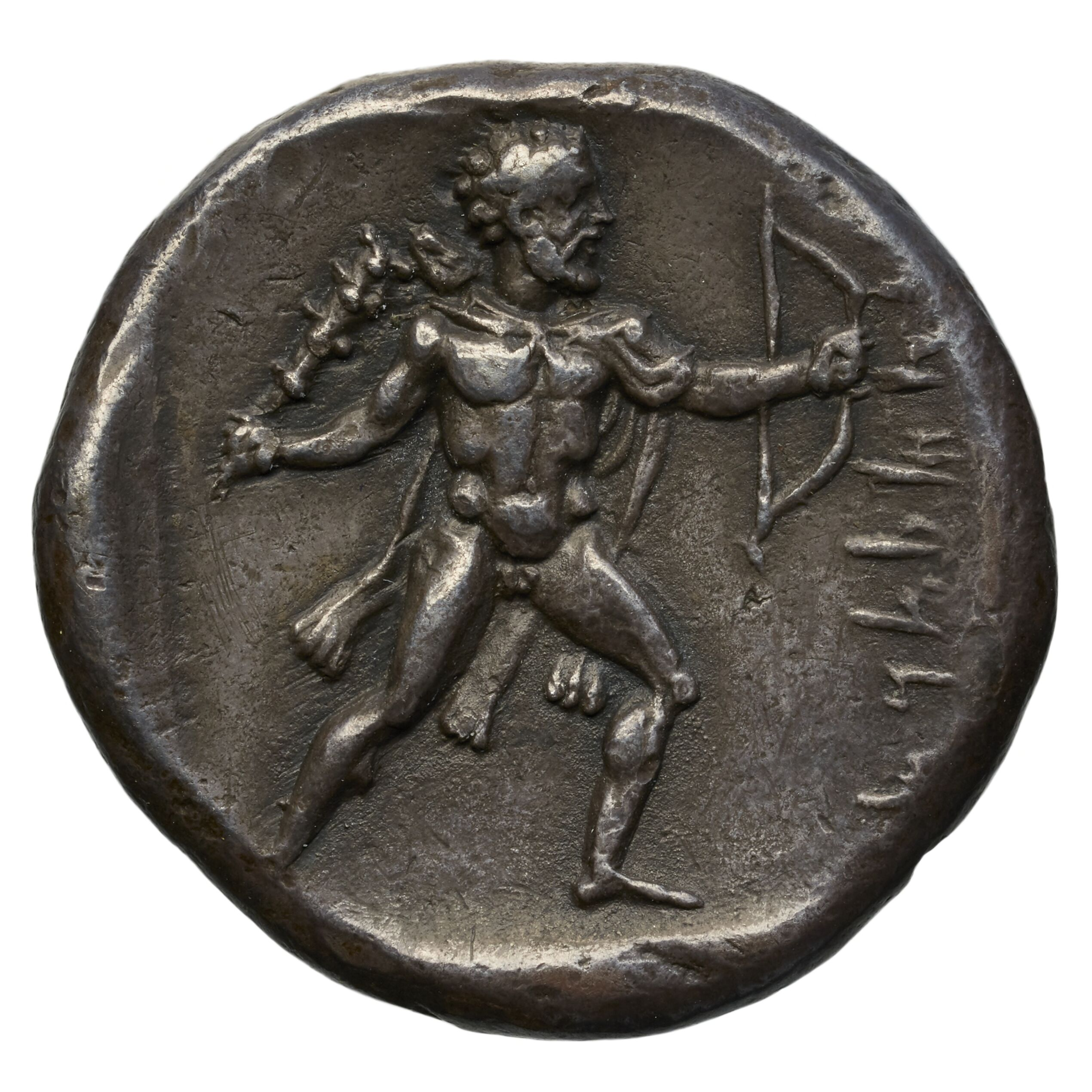
A coin of dmwnks of Lapathus, depicting Heracles

The coins of the city from the 5th and 4th centuries BC record rulers of the city, in Phoenician: dmwnks the first, ṣdqmlk, ʾndr... (shorted name), and dmwnks the second. The coins of the first two depicted the head of Athena, and the coins of the last two depicted Athena standing and Heracles.

In the war between Ptolemy and Antigonus, Lapathus and its king Praxippus sided with the latter.

The Delphic Theorodokoi inscription records Lapethos among the Cypriot cities included in the Delphic network of sacred envoys.

The name of the place became synonymous with stupidity.

== See also ==
- Lapithos
- Larnakas tis Lapithou
- Anat Athena bilingual
- Larnakas tis Lapithou pedestal inscription
