= Lapithus =

Lapithus may refer to:

- Lapiths, a legendary Greek tribe
- Lapathus (Cyprus), a town of ancient Cyprus
