= Max Ohnefalsch-Richter =

German art historian and archaeologist

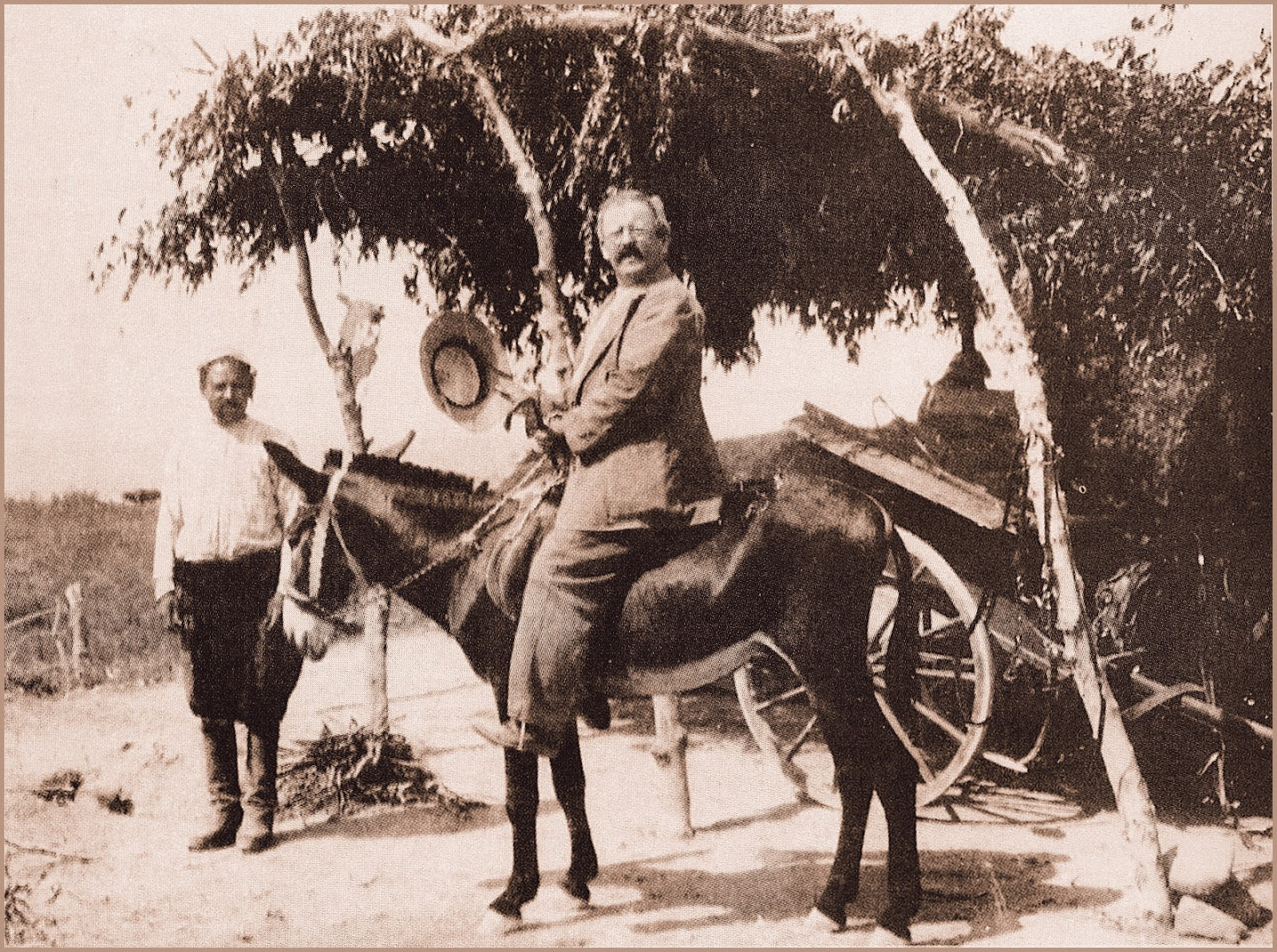
- Max Ohnefalsch-Richter in 1910 on Cyprus
- Born: April 7, 1850; Saxony, Germany
- Died: February 6, 1917 (aged 66)

Academic work
- Institutions: British Museum

Max Ohnefalsch-Richter (7 April 1850 – 6 February 1917) was a German archaeologist and antiquities seller.

He was born in Saxony in 1850 and arrived in British occupied Cyprus in 1878 to work as a journalist, in the following year he worked for the British Colonial government and the British Museum in carrying out excavations on behalf of Sir Charles Newton as well as private individuals. The discovered material was later sold to various European museums as well as in public auctions. In 1910, he was caught smuggling antiquities outside of Cyprus and was banned from carrying out further excavations. He carried out a number of excavations in Cyprus, at the sites of Idalion, Politiko and Tamassos. Together with John Myres he published a catalogue of the Cyprus Museum in 1899. He was the editor of two journals, The Owl. Science, Literature and Art (1888-1889) and The Journal of Cypriote Studies, with only one issue in 1889. He died in Germany.

== Publications ==
- Ohnefalsch-Richter, M., 1888. Die vor-babylonischen und babylonischen Einflüsse in Hissarlik und Cypern, Zeitschrift für Assyriologie, 3, 62-68.
- Ohnefalsch-Richter, M., 1888. La croix gammée et la croix cantonnée à Chypre. In: Bulletins de la Société d'anthropologie de Paris, III° Série. Tome 11. 669-682.
- Ohnefalsch-Richter, M., 1889. Ledrai-Lidir and the Copper-Bronze-Age, The Journal of Cyprian Studies, 1, 1-9.
- Ohnefalsch-Richter, M., 1889. Excavations for Sir Charles Newton. September and October 1882. Temenos of Artemis-Kybele at Achna, The Owl. Science, Literature and Art, 10-11, 78-80, 81-86.
- Ohnefalsch-Richter, M., 1889. Kypros, Die Bibel und Homer. Berlin. 1893.
- Ohnefalsch-Richter, M., 1889. Cyprus, The Bible and Homer. London: Asher. 1893.
- Myres, J. L., & Ohnefalsch-Richter, M. 1899. A catalogue of the Cyprus Museum with a chronicle of excavations undertaken since the British occupation and introductory notes on Cypriote Archaeology. Clarendon Press.
- Ohnefalsch-Richter, M., 1899. Neues über die auf Cypern mit Unterstützung seiner Majestät des Kaisers, der Berliner Museen und der Rudolf-Virchow-Stiftung angestellten Ausgrabungen, Verhandlungen der Berliner Gesellschaft für Anthropologie, Ethnologie und Urgeschichte, 29-78, 298-401.
- Ohnefalsch-Richter, M. 1891. Die antiken Cultusstätten auf Kypros. Berlin: Druck v. H. S. Hermann.
- Ohnefalsch-Richter, M., 1891. Ancient Places of Worship in Kypros Catalogued and Described. Phd Thesis, University of Leipzig.

== See also ==
- Tamassos bilinguals
