= Oyebanji =

Oyèbánjí (Name and Surname)
- Gender: Male
- Language: Yoruba

Origin
- Origin: Nigerian
- Meaning: Honor/Chieftaincy woke up with me
- Region of origin: South-West Nigeria

Oyebanji is both a given name and a surname. Notable people with the name include:

- Oyebanji Filani, Nigerian physician
- Biodun Oyebanji (born 1967), Nigerian politician
