= Henry Perigal Borrell =

British numismatist

Henry Perigal Borrell (1795, London – 2 October 1851, Smyrna) was a British numismatist. He was the son of John Henry Borrell (anglicised from Borel), a London clockmaker from Couvet, Switzerland, and Kitty Borrell (née Howe). Having learned the numismatics trade in London, he traveled to the Ottoman Empire and set up home and shop in Smyrna as a trader, from 1818 right up until his death. Two years after his arrival, in 1820, he married Emelia Boddington in Smyrna. In the 1820s, he obtained an inscription from Aphrodisias, a copy of which he sent to August Boeckh. In 1838 he met the 6th Duke of Devonshire at Smyrna and sold him the Chatsworth Head (found at Tamassos). Via the Bank of England, Borrell also supplied coins to the British Museum.

He also devoted much time and energy to discovering unpublished ancient Greek coins, with his results being presented in papers in the Revue Numismatique, the Numismatic Chronicle (including articles in 1839 on "Coins in Andeda in Pisida" and in 1841 "On the coins reading OKOKLIEŌN"), and a number of German numismatic periodicals. In 1836 he published at Paris a "Notice sur quelques médailles grecques des rois de Chypre" (Notice on some Greek medals of the kings of Cyprus) in Paris. He also became an associate member of the Numismatic Society of London on 28 November 1839, and remained so until his death. His coins, antiquities, and gems collection was sold after his death by Sotheby and Wilkinson of London in 1851, who also sold his numismatic library 2 years later, on 28 February 1853. Most of his many children remained in Smyrna, though Frederick Anthony Borrell (1836–1905) returned to London, marrying Laura Bithinia Maceroni there in 1857. Henry had sent a notebook of more than 200 ancient Greek and other Eastern Mediterranean inscriptions to James Kennedy Baillie MRIA, Rector of Ardtrea (1793–1864) during his lifetime, and it still survives today.

== Family ==
Henry Perigal Borrell had 6 siblings: Harriot Borrell, Elizabeth Borrell, Judith Catherine Borrell, Ann Magdalene Borrell, Maximilian John Borrell and George Howe Borrell.

=== Descendants ===
Henry Perigal Borrell and his wife have a few notable descendants.

- Miles Malleson
- Junio Valerio Borghese

== Other sources ==
- Gentleman's Magazine, 2nd ser., 39 (1853), 324
- Notice of his death in "Proceedings of the Numismatic Society for 24 June 1852", Numismatic Chronicle, 14 (1851–2)
- List of honorary members in R. A. G. Carson and H. Pagan, A history of the Royal Numismatic Society, 1836–1986 (1986), 79
- F.Boase, Modern English biography: containing many thousand concise memoirs of persons who have died since the year 1850, 6 vols. (privately printed, Truro, 1892–1921); repr.(1965)
- "Inscriptions of Aphrodisias Project"
