= Anat Athena bilingual =

Greek-Phoenician inscription

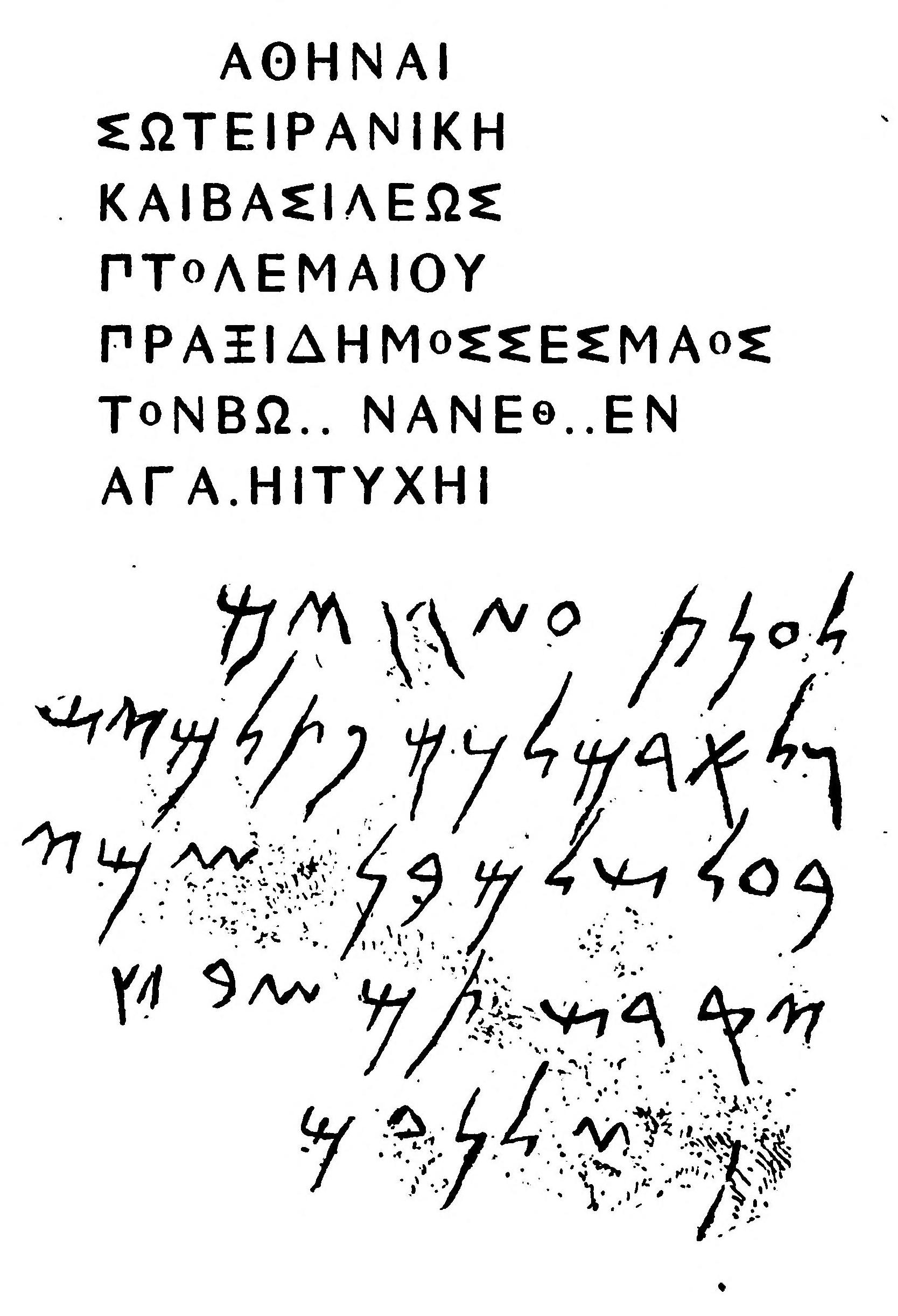
The inscription, as published by Melchior de Vogüé in 1867.

The Anat Athena bilingual is a late fourth century BCE bilingual Greek-Phoenician inscription on a rock-cut stone found in the outskirts of the village of Larnakas tis Lapithou, Cyprus. It was discovered just above the village, at the foot of a conical agger, 6m high and 40 meters in circumference. It was originally found in c.1850.

== Text of the inscription ==
The inscription reads:

(Greek, lines 1-2)	Ἀθηνᾷ / Σωτείρᾳ, Νίκῃ,	To Athena / who protects, to Victory,
(3-4)	καὶ βασιλέως / Πτολεμαίου,	(to the victory that is) also of King / Ptolemy,
(5)	Πραξίδημος Σέσμαος	Praxidemos, the son of Sesmas,
(6)	τὸν βω[μὸ]ν ἀνέθ[ηκ]εν.	has dedicated the altar.
(7)	Ἀγα[θ]ῇ τύχῃ!	Good luck!
(Phoenician, line 1)	L‘NT ‘Z ḤYM	To ‘Anat, Strength of the Living,
(2)	WL’D<N> MLKM PTLMYŠ	and to the Lord of Kings Ptolemy,
(3)	B‘LŠLM BN [S]SMY	Baalsillem, son of Sesmay,
(4)	YQDŠ [’]T MZBḤ	dedicated (the) altar.
(5)	[L]MZL N‘M	To good fortune!

== Comments ==
It has been called "The most striking and interesting evidence for the identification of Anat with Athena", as the altar's Phoenician dedication to Anat is directly translated into Athena in the Greek. The inscription also provided the first known reference to Anat in a Canaanite inscription. It is also dedicated to the Egyptian king Ptolemaeus (Ptolemy I Soter) (note that Athena's Greek epitheton in line 2, "Soteira", Protectress, is the female equivalent of Ptolemy's epitheton "Soter"). The victory referred to in the Greek text is the final victory of this Ptolemy over a Cypriot coalition in 312 BCE.

The inscription is cut into a wall of rock on the southern slope of a peak of the Kyrenia Mountains. The inscription was first published by Melchior de Vogüé in 1867.

Max Ohnefalsch-Richter wrote that:

There is a bilingual inscription in Kypros whose importance has not been sufficiently realized... There is no trace here of a cultus with images. If such had existed, the very thorough examination to which the ground has been subjected must have brought some fragments to light. Remains of narrow walls seem to belong to a peribolos, which further excavation would probably reveal more completely. A sacred enclosure round the altar is dedicated to Anat-Athene, as the enclosures on Sinai to Yahve, on Ida to Zeus, and on the hill of Paphos to Aphrodite. While, however, we have only literary tradition for the dedication to the last three divinities, we have in the present instance the votive inscription itself cut on the living rock of the wild mountain district, the rock which may well have been the symbol, of the goddess, as Mount Carmel and the Arkadian Olympos were symbols of Yahve and Zeus. We can scarcely conceive of a more poetical idea than to present Anat-Athene, the vigour of life, the victorious goddess of Peace, wounding, but healing the wounds she makes, by a mighty peak of rock which lifts its summit to Heaven. This is perhaps the only known example of a purely imageless cultus attested by a bilingual inscription, and practised in the open air on a mountain.

The Phoenician inscription is known as KAI 42, CIS I 95 and R 1515.

== Bibliography ==
- G. M. Lee (1969) On a Phoenician Bilingual Inscription at Larnax, Lapethos, Palestine Exploration Quarterly, 101:2, 122-122, DOI: 10.1179/peq.1969.101.2.122

== See also ==
- Bilingual inscriptions
- Idalion bilingual
- Tamassos bilinguals
