= Kampyli =

Kampyli: Καμπυλή (Greek); Hisarköy (Turkish)
- Location within Cyprus
- Coordinates: 35°18′05″N 33°06′25″E
- Country (de jure): Cyprus
  - District: Kyrenia District
- Country (de facto): Northern Cyprus
  - District: Girne District

Population (2011)
  - Total: 194

Kampyli (Greek: Καμπυλή; Turkish: Hisarköy “castle village”, previously Kambilli) is a small Turkish Cypriot village in Cyprus, located approximately 3 km (1.9 mi) east of Myrtou. It is under the de facto control of Northern Cyprus. In 1831, 30% of the village's inhabitants were Maronite Cypriots. They all left by 1940, and, around that time, Muslim families from Larnakas tis Lapithou moved into Kampyli. As of 2011, Kampyli had population of 194.
