= Tamassos bilinguals =

4th-century BC pedestals with Cypriot-Phoenician inscriptions

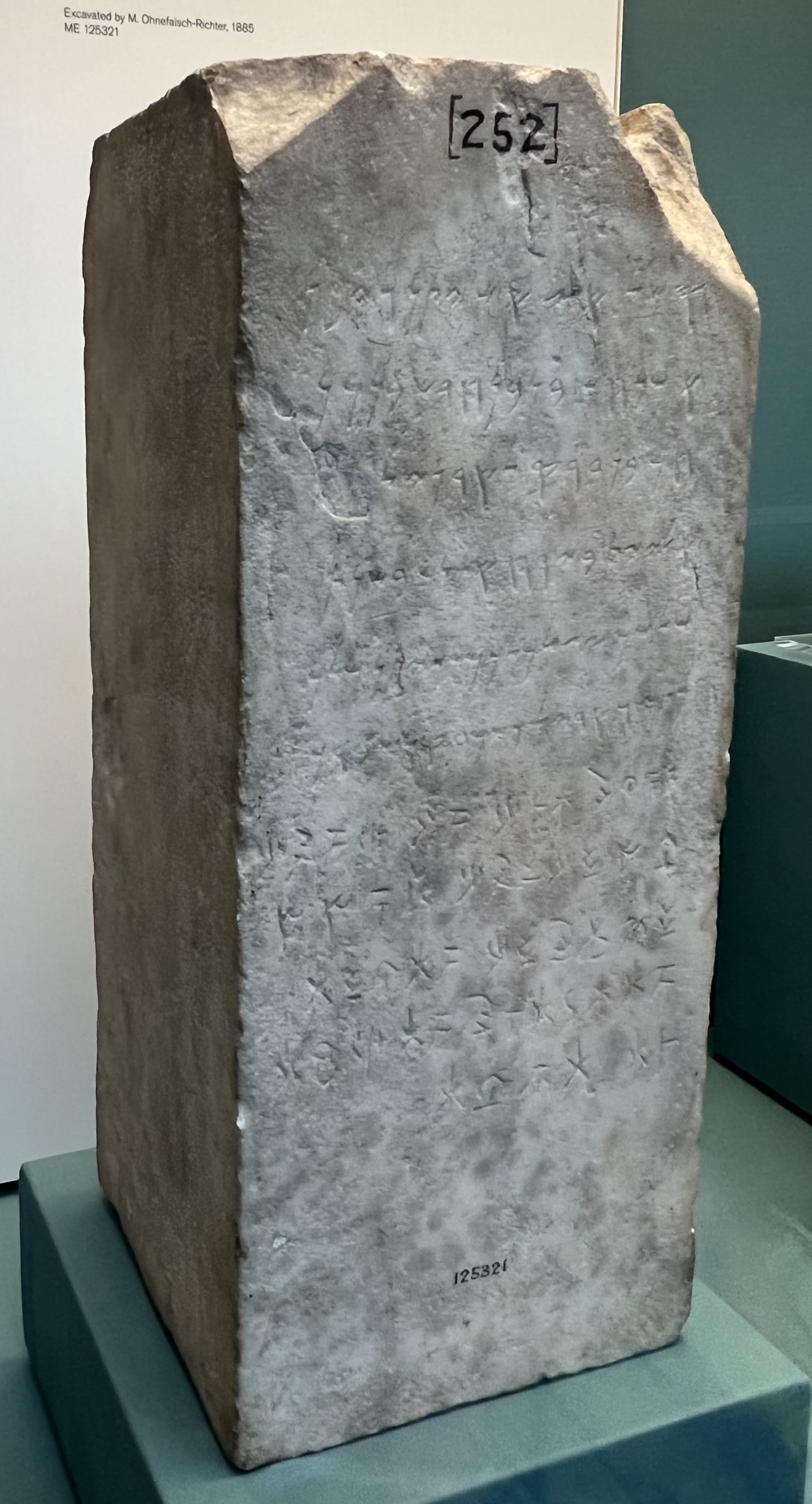
- Tamassos bilingual 1
- Material: Stone
- Created: c. 363 BC
- Discovered: 1885; Pera Orinis, Nicosia, Cyprus
- Discovered by: Max Ohnefalsch-Richter
- Present location: London, England, United Kingdom
- Language: Phoenician

The Tamassos bilinguals are a pair of bilingual Cypriot–Phoenician inscriptions on stone pedestals found in 1885 in Tamassos, Cyprus. It has been dated to 363 BC.

It was discovered by Max Ohnefalsch-Richter, in excavations funded by Charles Watkins, Cyprus Director of the Imperial Ottoman Bank, and in conjunction with Colonel Falkland Warren, Chief Secretary of Cyprus. A subsequent legal battle broke out between Watkins and Warren regarding ownership of the excavated antiquities.

It is currently in the British Museum, with identification numbers BM 125321 and BM 125322. The Phoenician inscriptions are known as RÉS 1212 (KAI 41) and RÉS 1213.

They were displayed at the 1886 Colonial and Indian Exhibition, and were acquired by the British Museum from Warren via antiquities dealer Rollin & Feuardent in 1892.

== Inscription number 1 ==
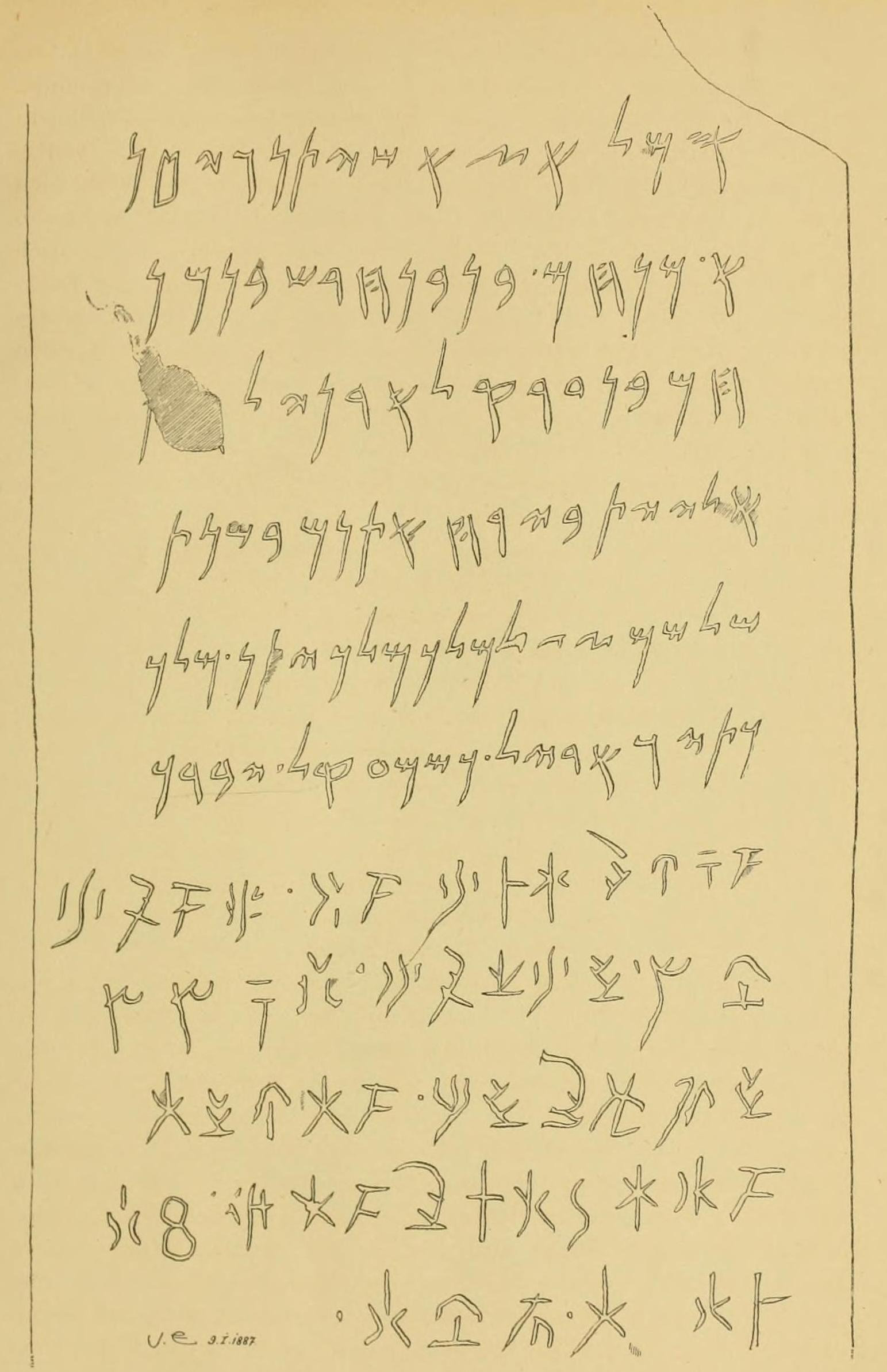
Sketch

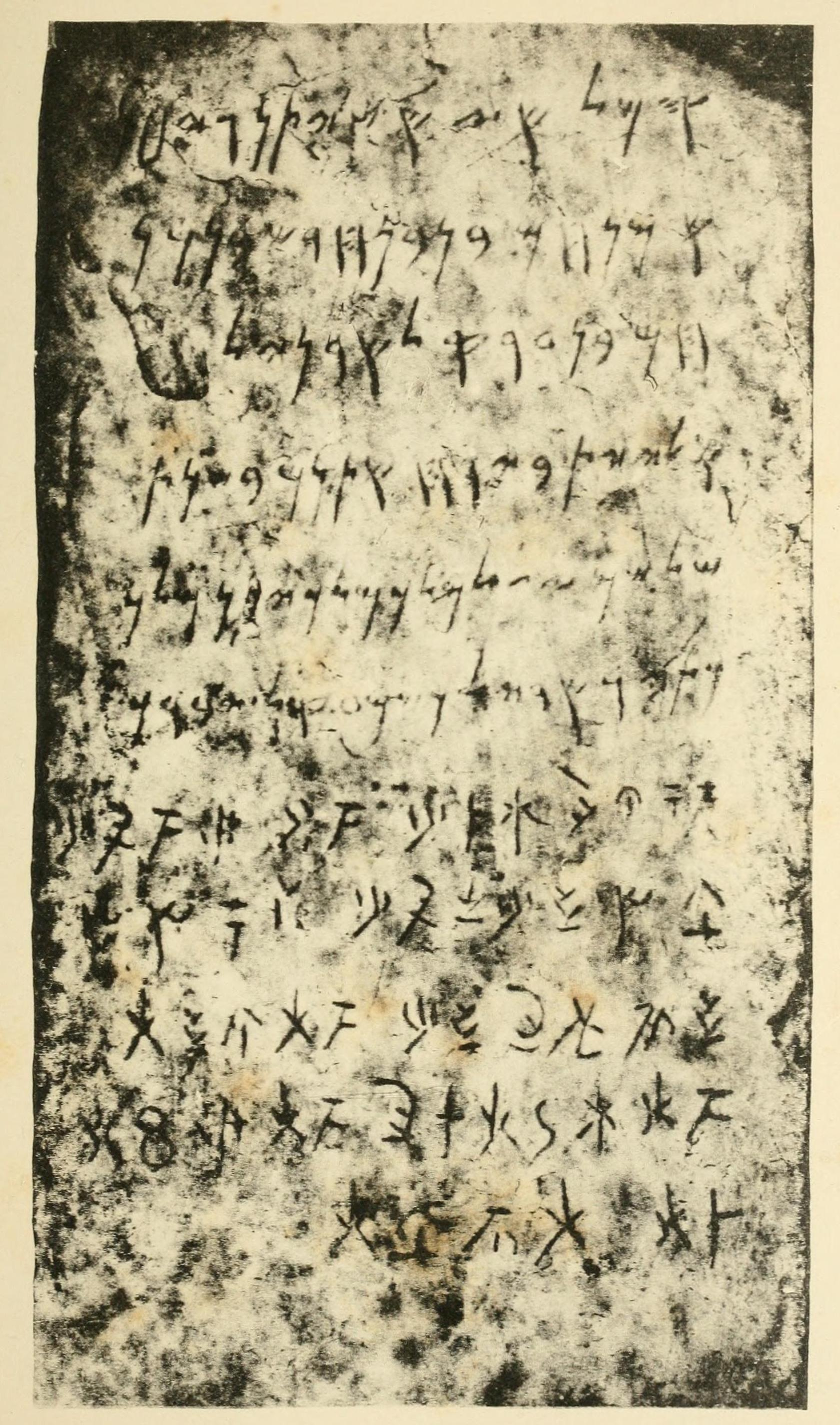
Photograph

Inscription number 1

Inscription number 1 is an imported marble pedestal with a six line Phoenician inscription and a five line Cypriot inscription. The inscription is a statue dedication:

𐤎𐤌𐤋 𐤀𐤆 𐤀𐤔 𐤉𐤕𐤍 𐤅𐤉𐤈𐤍
sml ʾz ʾš ytn wyṭn
This statue has been given and erected

𐤀 𐤌𐤍𐤇𐤌 𐤁𐤍 𐤁𐤍𐤇𐤃𐤔 𐤁𐤍 𐤌𐤍
ʾ mnḥm bn bnḥdš bn mn-
by Menahem, son of Benhodesh, son of Men-

𐤇𐤌 𐤁𐤍 𐤏𐤓𐤒 𐤋𐤀𐤃𐤍𐤉 𐤋[𐤓𐤔]𐤐
-ḥm bn ʿrq lʾdny l[rš]p
-ahem, son of (i.e. from?) Arqa, to his lord, to [Reshe]p-

𐤀𐤋𐤉𐤉𐤕 𐤁𐤉𐤓𐤇 𐤀𐤕𐤍𐤌 𐤁𐤔𐤍𐤕
ʾlyyt byrḥ ʾtnm bšnt
'LYYT, in the month of Etanim, in year

𐤔𐤋𐤔𐤌 𐤘 𐤗 𐤋𐤌𐤋𐤊 𐤌𐤋𐤊𐤉𐤕𐤍 𐤌𐤋𐤊
šlšm 20 10 lmlk mlkytn mlk
thirty (20+10) of king Milkyaton, king of

𐤊𐤕𐤉 𐤅𐤀𐤃𐤉𐤋 𐤊𐤔𐤌𐤏 𐤒𐤋 𐤟 𐤉𐤁𐤓𐤊
kty wʾdyl kmšʿ ql · ytbrk
Kition and Idalion, because He heard his voice. May he be blessed!

The Cypriot text was first translated by M. D. Pierides.

𐠰𐠙 ' 𐠯𐠥𐠀𐠭𐠚𐠰𐠝 ' 𐠰𐠝 ' 𐠁𐠰𐠋𐠚
to-na ' ti-ri-a-ta-ne ' to-nu ' e-to-ke-ne
The statue that this is, dedicated

𐠊𐠩 ' 𐠃𐠚𐠮𐠋𐠚 ' 𐠔𐠙𐠩𐠩
ka-se ' o-no-te-ke-ne ' ma-na-se-se
and raised by Manasses,

𐠃𐠜𐠕𐠛𐠃𐠚 ' 𐠰𐠂𐠯𐠃𐠂
o-no-ma-ni-o-ne ' to-i-ti-o-i
son of Nomenios, to the god

𐠰𐠂𐠀𐠟𐠂𐠒𐠛 ' 𐠰𐠂𐠁𐠐𐠂
to-i-a-pe-i-lo-ni ' to-i-e-le-i-
Apollo Elei-

𐠰𐠂 ' 𐠂𐠱𐠊𐠂
-to-i ' i-tu-ka-i
-tas, to good fortune.

== Inscription number 2 ==
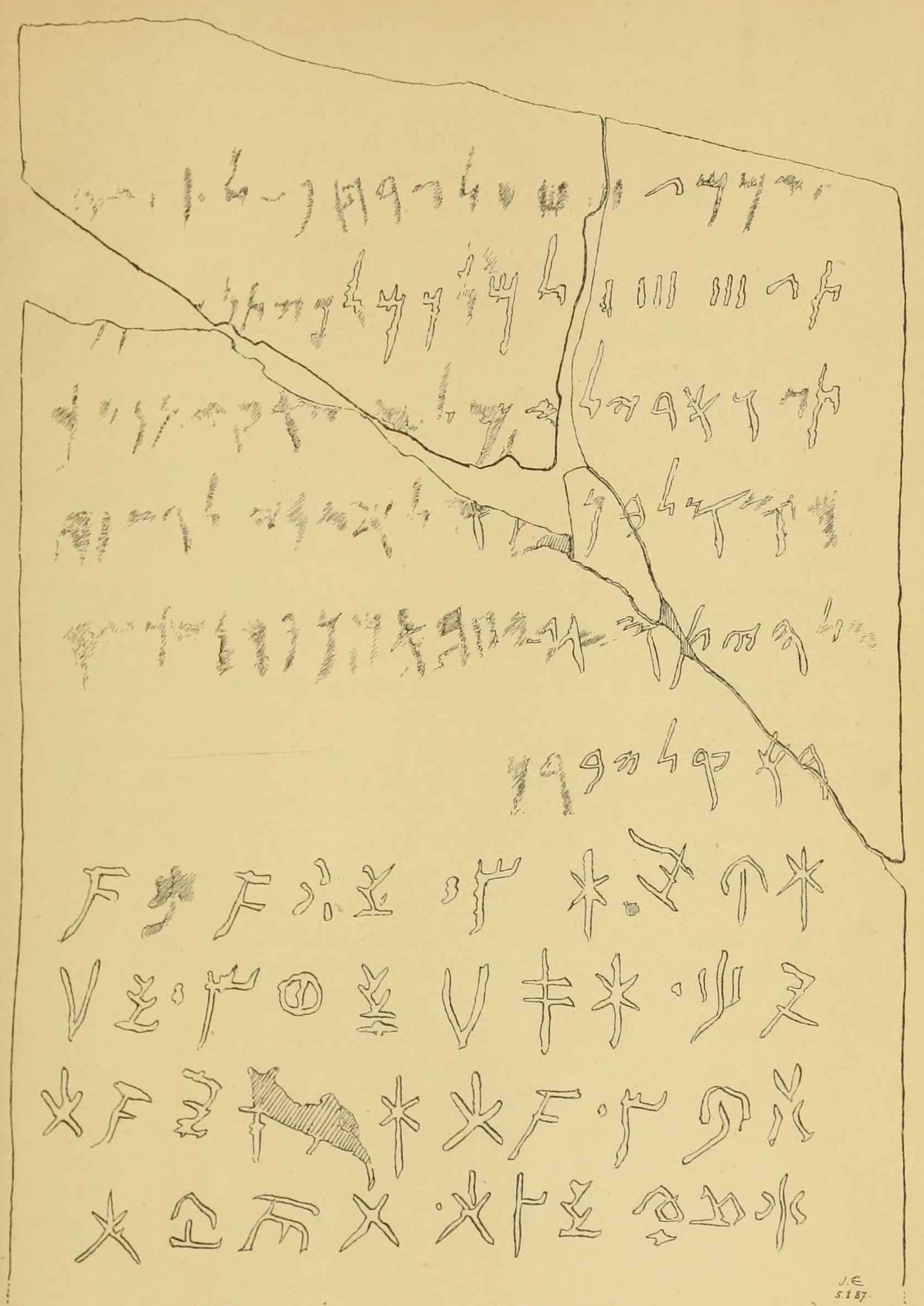
Sketch

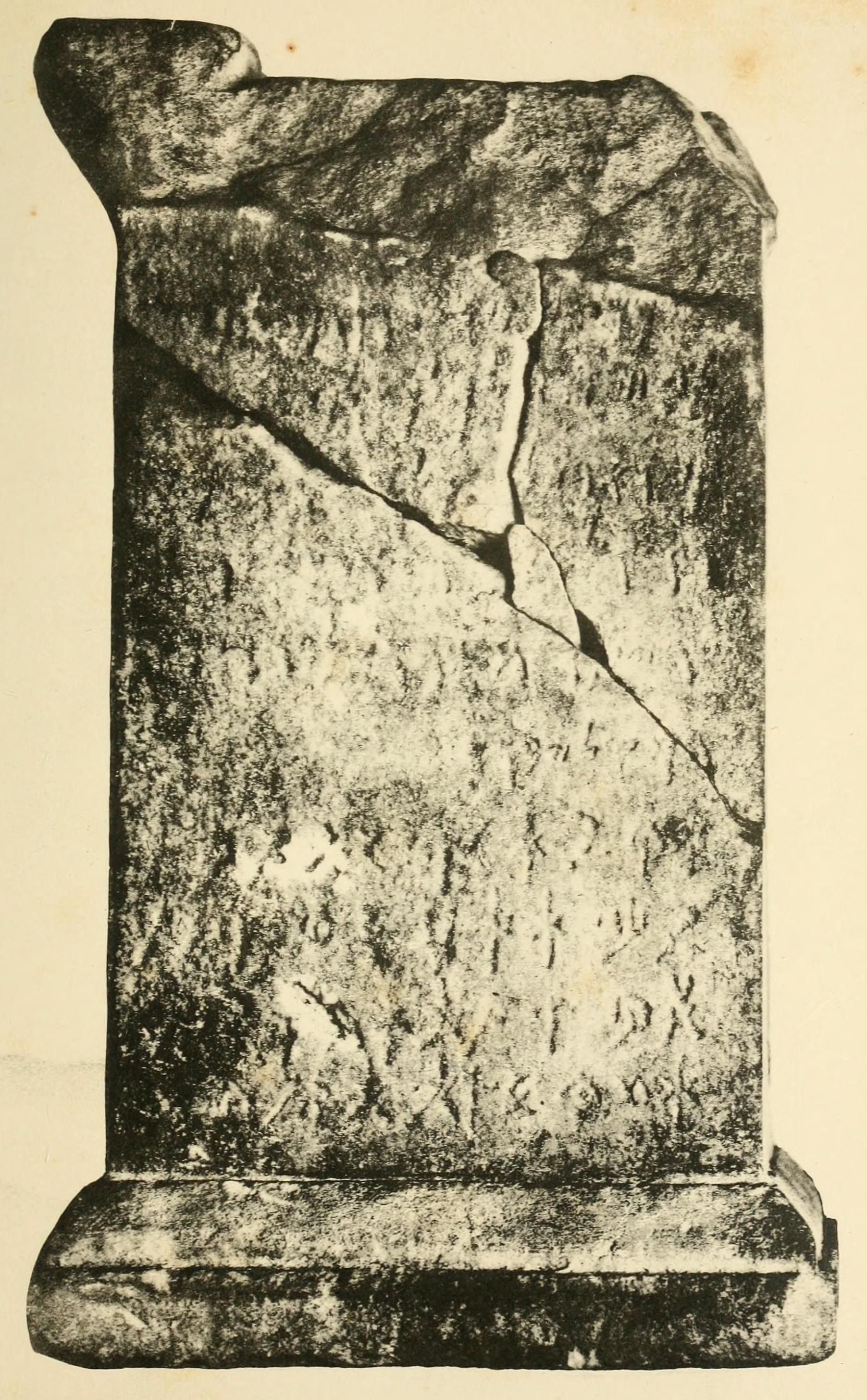
Photograph

Inscription number 2

Inscription number 2 is on a limestone pedestal, with a worn inscription. The inscription is a statue dedication to Reshef-Elenites (Apollo Alasiotes) by 'Abd-sasom on the 16th day of the 17th year of Milkyaton or Melekyaton, king of Kition and Idalion.

[𐤁𐤉𐤌𐤌 𐤗 𐤛 𐤛 𐤖 𐤋𐤉𐤓𐤇 𐤐𐤏𐤋[𐤕 𐤁𐤔𐤍
bymm 10 3 3 1 lyrḥ pʿl[t bšn-]
On day 36 of the month of P'L[T, in ye]-

𐤕 𐤛 𐤛 𐤖[𐤚] 𐤋𐤌𐤋𐤊 𐤌𐤋𐤊𐤉𐤕𐤍 [𐤌𐤋𐤊 𐤊]
-t 3 3 [3] lmlk mlkytn [mlk k-]
-ar 9 (3+3+3) of king Milkyaton, [king of Ki-]

[...𐤕𐤉 𐤅𐤀𐤃𐤉𐤋 [𐤎]𐤌𐤋 𐤀𐤔 [𐤉𐤕𐤍
-ty wʾdyl [s]ml ʾz [ytn...]
-tion and Idalion, this statue [he dedicated...]

𐤎𐤎𐤌 𐤁𐤍 [𐤎]𐤌𐤀 𐤋𐤀𐤃𐤍𐤉 𐤋𐤓𐤔𐤐 𐤀...
...ssm bn [s]mʾ lʾdny lršp ʾ-
...-sasom, son of (i.e. from?) Samos, is consecrated to his lord, to Reshep-'-

𐤋𐤄𐤉𐤕𐤎 [...] 𐤊𐤔𐤌𐤏 𐤒
-lhyts ... kšmʿ q-
-LHYTS ... for he heard (the) call-

𐤓𐤀 𐤒𐤋 𐤉𐤕𐤁𐤓𐤊
-rʾ ql ytbrk
-ing of (the) voice. May he be blessed!

𐠀𐠯𐠥𐠀𐠩 ' 𐠠𐠝𐠰 ' 𐠁𐠰
a-ti-ri-a-se ' pi-nu-to ' e-to-
(The) prudent statue pre-

𐠋𐠚 ' 𐠀𐠞𐠨𐠫𐠗𐠩 ' 𐠃𐠨
-ke-ne ' a-pa-sa-so-mo-se ' o-sa-
-sented (by) Apsassomos, the Sa-

𐠔𐠵𐠩 ' 𐠰𐠂𐠀𐠡𐠒𐠛𐠰𐠂
-ma-wo-se ' to-i-a-po-lo-ni-to-i
-mian, to Apollo

𐠀𐠏𐠪𐠃𐠭𐠂 ' 𐠂𐠱𐠊𐠂
a-la-si-o-ta-i ' i-tu-ka-i
Alasiotas, for luck.

== Bibliography ==
- Given, M. (2001) The fight for the past: Watkins vs Warren (1885–6) and the control of excavation. In: Tatton-Brown, V. (ed.) Cyprus in the 19th Century AD : Fact, Fancy and Fiction : Papers of the 22nd British Museum Classical Colloquium, December 1998. Oxbow Books: Oxford, pp. 244-249. ISBN 9781842170335
- J. Euting and W. Deecke, Zwei bilingue Inschriften aus Tamassos, Sitzungsberichte der Königlich Preussischen Akademie der Wissenschaften zu Berlin, 1887, p. 115 — 123
- A bilingual inscription (Phoenician and Kypriote). Recently discovered near the ancient town of Tamassos, Cyprus, during excavations carried out by Colonel Falk. Warren R A., Proceedings of the Society of Biblical Archaeology for December 1886 and January 1887.
- Berger Philippe. La seconde inscription bilingue de Tamassus. In: Comptes rendus des séances de l'Académie des Inscriptions et Belles-Lettres, 31ᵉ année, N. 2, 1887. pp. 187-201. DOI: 10.3406/crai.1887.69318

== See also ==
- Bilingual inscriptions
- Idalion bilingual
