= Kampia, Cyprus =

Village in Nicosia District, Cyprus

Kampia: Καμπιά (Greek); Kambiye (Turkish)
- Village
- Location in Cyprus
- Coordinates: 35°0′25″N 33°15′22″E
- Country: Cyprus
- District: Nicosia District

Population (2001)
  - Total: 417
- Time zone: UTC+2 (EET)
  - Summer (DST): UTC+3 (EEST)

Kampia, sometimes also spelled Kambia (Greek: Καμπιά; Turkish: Kambiye) is a small village located in the Nicosia District of Cyprus, south of the town of Pera Orinis.
