= Larnakas tis Lapithou pedestal inscription =

3rd-century BC Phoenician inscription

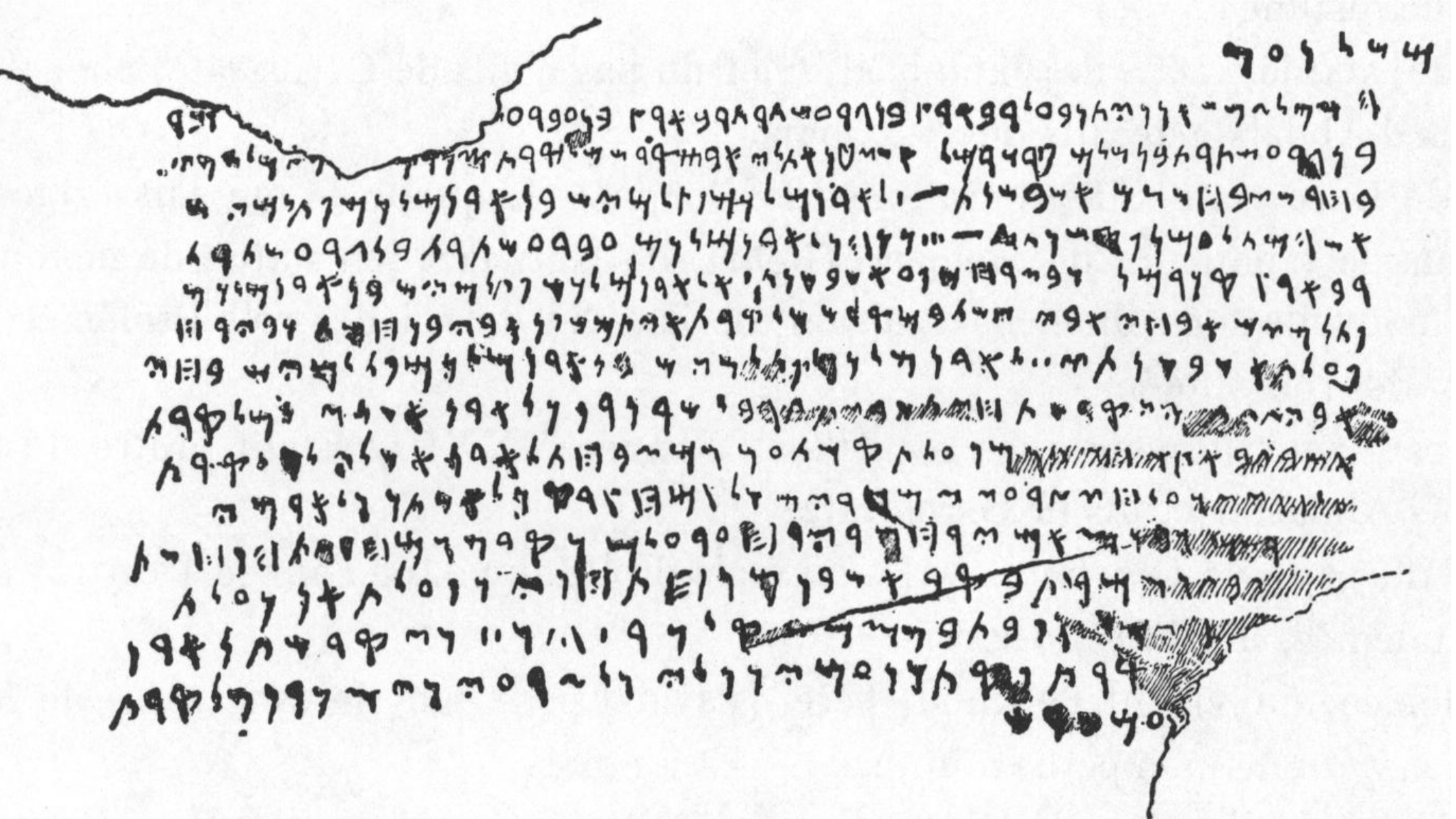
- The inscription, as published by Ph. Berger in 1894
- Material: Marble
- Height: 44 cm
- Width: 69 cm
- Created: c. 275 BC
- Discovered: 1893; Larnakas tis Lapithou, Girne, Northern Cyprus
- Discovered by: Emile Deschamps
- Present location: Paris, Ile-de-France, France
- Language: Phoenician

The Larnakas tis Lapithou pedestal inscription, also known as KAI 43 or RES 1211, is a sixteen-line Phoenician inscription on the pedestal of a now lost statue of a local Cypriote governor, Yatonbaal. It is on a piece of greyish marble, measuring 44 by 69 centimeters, found in 1893 by Émile Deschamps at the foot of a hill near the northeastern Cypriote village of Larnax-Lapithou (ancient Narnaka), in a field strewn with ancient stones, "that local inhabitants use as building material".

The inscription is now in the Louvre, with identification AM 624. It probably dates from 275 BCE.

== Text of the inscription ==
The inscription reads:

(line 1)	MŠL N‘M	A good likeness! (or: An excellent ruler!)
(2)	HSML Z MŠ ’NK YTNB‘L RB ’RṢ BN GR‘ŠTRT RB ’RṢ BN ‘BD[‘ŠTRT RB ’RṢ BN ‘BD’]SR	This image (is a) statue of me, Yatonba‘al, Governor of the region, the son of Ger‘astart the regional governor, the son of Bod[‘astart the regional governor, the son of ‘Abd-O]siri,
(3)	BN GR‘ŠTRT BN ŠLM PRKRML(?) ’Š YṬN’T LY ’BMQDŠ MLQRT S[KR BḤY(?)]M LŠMY	the son of Ger‘astart, the son of Shallum, that I erected for myself in the sanctuary of Melqart as a me[morial among the livi]ng for my name,
(4)	BḤDŠ ZBḤŠMŠ ’Š BŠNT 10 1 L’DN MLKM PTLMYŠ BN ’DN MLKM PTLMYŠ	on the new moon of (the month of) Zebaḥ-Šamaš in year 11 of the Lord of Kings Ptolemy, the son of the Lord of Kings Ptolemy,
(5)	’Š HMT L‘M LPṬ ŠNT 20 10 3 WKHN L’DN MLKM ‘BD‘ŠTRT BN GR‘ŠTRT	which (according to the calendar of) the people of Lapethos is year 33, and (when) priest to the Lord of Kings (was) Bod‘astart, the son of Ger‘astart,
(6)	RB ’RṢ PRKRML(?) WBYRḤ MP‘ ’Š BŠNT 3 L’DN MLKM PTLMYŠ BN ’DN MLKM	the regional governor. And in the month of Mûfa‘ in year 3 of the Lord of Kings Ptolemy, son of the Lord of Kings,
(7)	PTLMYŠ ’BḤY ’BY YŠT BMQDŠ MLQRT ’YT MŠ PN ’BY BNḤŠT WBYRḤ	Ptolemy, while my father was (still) alive, I placed in the sanctuary of Milqart a bronze bust (lit.: a statue of the face) of my father. And in the month of
(8)	P‘LT ’Š BŠNT 3 2 L’DN MLKM PTLMYŠ BN ’DN MLKM PTLMYŠ BḤY	Pa‘loth, in year 12 (or 5?) of the Lord of Kings Ptolemy, the son of the Lord of Kings Ptolemy, while
(9)	’BY YTT WYQDŠT ḤYT ŠGYT BGBL ŠD NRNK L’DN ’Š LY LMLQRT	my father was (still) alive, I presented and dedicated many shrines in the territory of the region of Narnaka to my Lord Melqart,
(10)	[W]ŠBT B’T HḤYT [KM(?)] P‘LT QMT ‘M W<K>M ZBḤT L’DN ’Š LY LMLQRT	and I ... (those) temples. Also I acquired the respect of the people, and also I sacrificed to my Lord Melqart,
(11)	‘L ḤYY W‘L ḤY ZR‘Y YM MD YM WLṢMḤ ṢDQ [W]L’[D]T[Y] WL’DMY	for (long) life for me and (long) life for my offspring, day by day (i.e., I sacrificed daily), and (I sacrificed) for the legitimate crown prince and for my Lady (the queen) and for my Lord (the king)
(12)	[BḤD]ŠM WBKS’M YRḤ MD YRḤ ‘D ‘LM KQDM KM HDLT HNḤŠT	on the new moons and on the full moons, month by month, uninterruptedly in accordance with Ancient Practice. Also [this] bronze plaque
(13)	[Z K]TBT WSMRT BQR ’Š BN MNḤT ḤNY WP‘LT ’NK ‘LT	I [ins]cribed and nailed to the wall (of the temple), on which are (recorded) the details of my generosity. And I made for
(14)	[HMQDŠ] HYM Z ’P[D]T(?) BK[S]P MŠQL K[K]R 100 [W] 2 WYQDŠT L’DN	[the sanctuary] ... an ephod(?) (liturgical apron) of silver weighing 102 «KR», and I dedicated (it) to (the) Lord,
(15)	[’Š LY LMLQ]RT PQT WN‘M YKN LY WLZR‘Y WYSKRN MLQRT	[that is mine, to Melq]art. May there be wealth and good fortune for me and for my offspring, and may Melqart remember me
(16)	[WYTN LY(?)] N‘M ŠRŠ	[and grant me?] a good family.

== Dating ==
The dating formulas in the inscription ("year x of the Lord of Kings Ptolemy, son of the Lord of Kings Ptolemy": lines 4, 6, 8) show that it dates from the time that the Egyptian Ptolemies ruled over Cyprus. However, it is not immediately evident which Ptolemies are meant. Berger in 1894 proposed that the inscription dated from year 11 of Ptolemy Soter II (107 BCE) or Ptolemy Philadelphus (275 BCE). Cooke (1903) suggested Ptolemy Philometor (170 BCE) or Ptolemy Soter II (107 BCE). More recent editors usually choose Ptolemy Philadelphus, the inscription then dates from the year 275 BCE.

== Comments ==
The ultrashort first line seems to be a separate caption to the statue: it consists of only six characters and these are more widely spaced than the rest of the inscription.

The author of the inscription, Yatonba‘al, apparently was a member of a very distinguished family: he was able to trace back his ancestry through six generations (lines 2–3), and both he himself, his father, and his grandfather held the office of regional governor, while Bod‘astart, his brother, was a priest in the royal cult for king Ptolemy (lines 5–6).

The hardly readable word PRKRML(?) in lines 3 and 6 probably was the name of the district where Yatonba‘al and his family lived. Berger, who read Q[W]RML, compared it to nearby (Cape) Kormakiti, and to (Mount) Karmel in Israel.

Lines 4-5 of the inscription mention the local calendar of Narnaka. If indeed the inscription was made in 275 BCE, which was year 33 of the "Narnaka calendar", then years must have been counted from 308/7 BCE. The city of Kition, on the southern coast of Cyprus, also had its own calendar, but that one counted from 312/1 BCE. Both calendars started in a period when the first Ptolemy fought fierce fights with competing diadochs over Cyprus.
