= Chatsworth Head =

Ancient bronze head

The Chatsworth Head
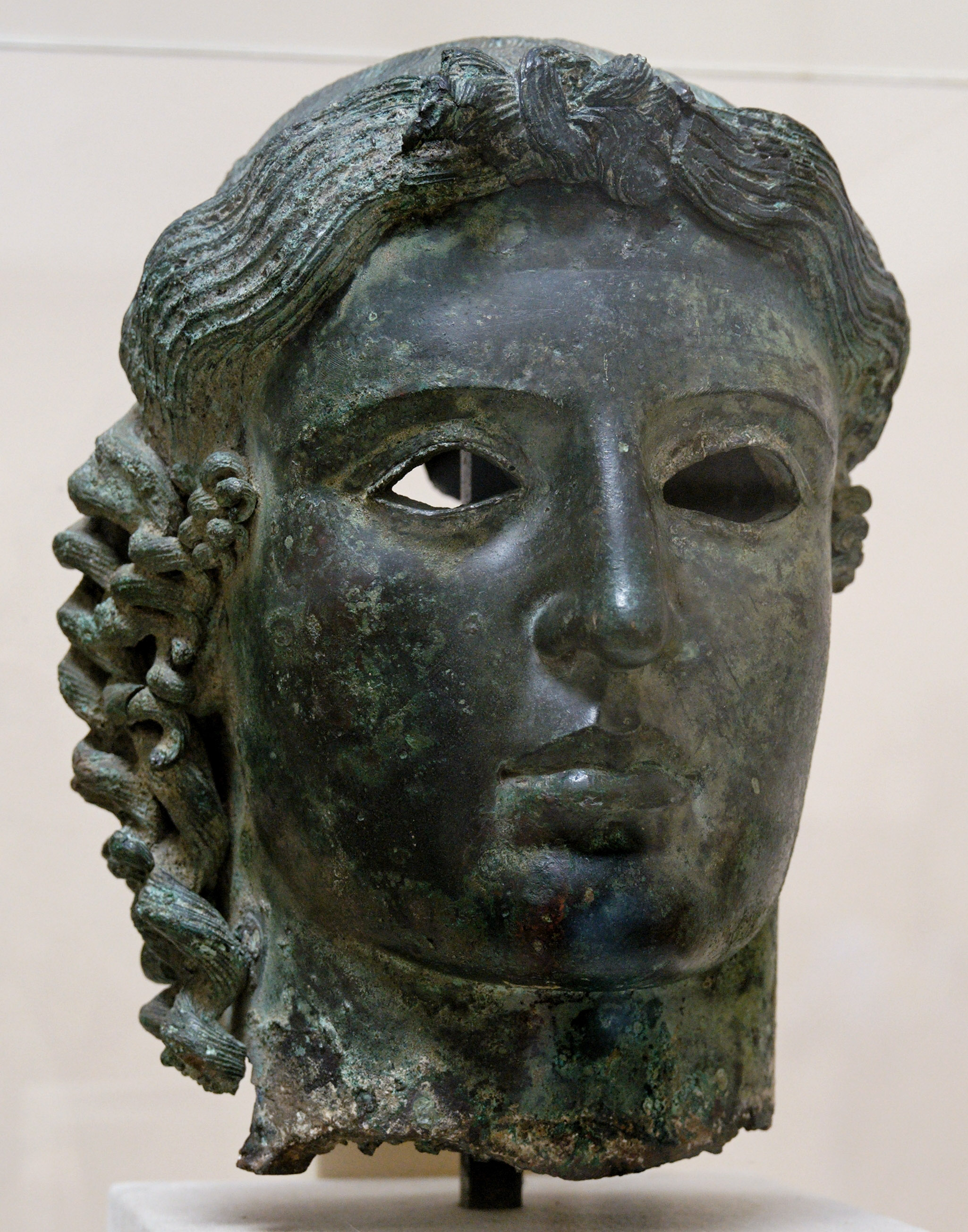
- Year: c. 460 BCE
- Type: Cast bronze
- Dimensions: 31.6 cm (12.4 in)
- Location: British Museum; London

The Chatsworth Head is a slightly over-life-size bronze head dating to around 460 BCE which is now in the British Museum.

== Description ==
The head was originally part of a complete statue, probably (judging by the shoulder-length curly hair) one of Apollo, made up of various sections (e.g. head, arms, legs, some of the locks of hair) produced separately by lost-wax casting then joined into one whole – a leg from the same sculpture is in the Louvre. Its eyes probably originally held marble, ivory or glass inlays, which were held in with surviving bronze plates, which curl outwards to form eyelashes. Its lips seem to have been plated with reddish copper to imitate their natural colour.

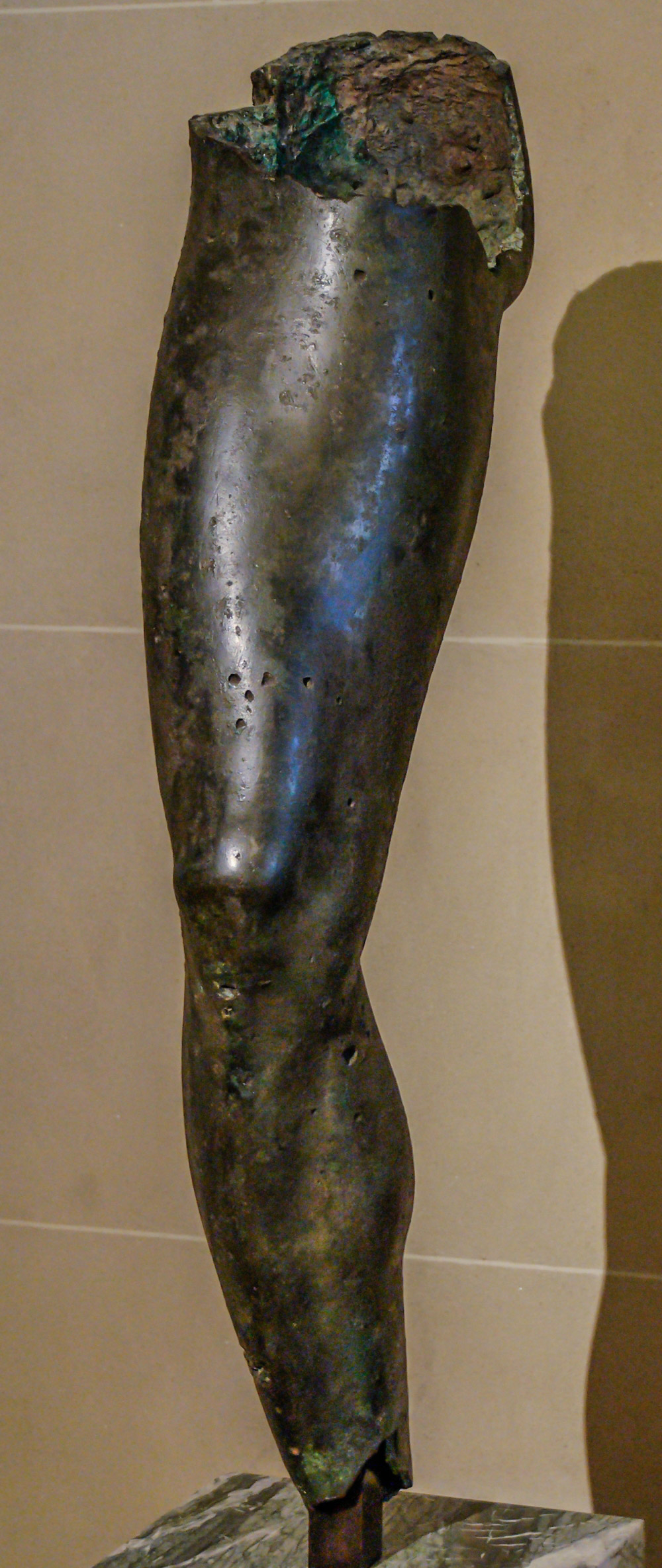
A bronze leg, probably from the same statue (Louvre)

== Discovery ==
In 1834, the Louvre purchased the first large bronze statue found in modern times after its discovery in Italy near Elba. Two years later a complete statue was discovered near Tamassos on Cyprus and was immediately retrieved by locals who dragged it from its position using oxcarts. During its journey the statue fell apart losing legs, arms and its torso.

== Provenance ==
The head was acquired by the 6th Duke of Devonshire at Smyrna from H. P. Borrell in 1838. The other parts of the statue were lost, but it is believed that a leg in the Louvre was originally part of this statue.

The 6th Duke of Devonshire and his successors kept it at their residence of Chatsworth House, from which it takes its name. It was loaned to the Fitzwilliam Museum in the mid-1930s, and was acquired from the 11th Duke by the British Museum in 1958.
