= Filan =

Filan is a surname. Notable people with this surname include:

- Boris Filan from Elán (band)
- Frank Filan (1905–1952), a photographer
- John Filan (born 1970), an Australian football player
- Shane Filan (born 1979), an Irish singer and songwriter
