= Politiko =

Politiko: Πολιτικό (Greek); Politigo (Turkish)
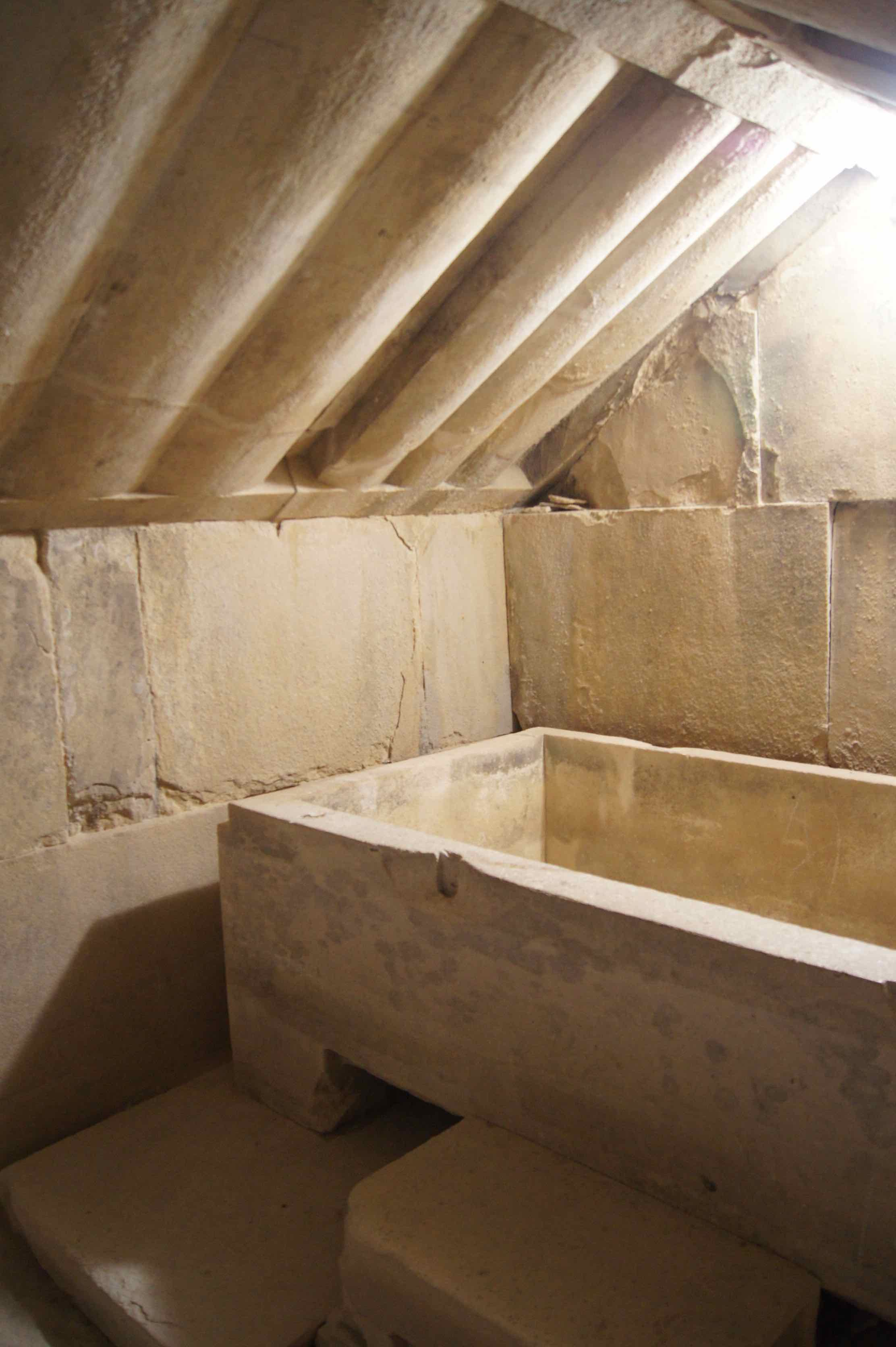
- Royal tomb, Tamassos

- Location in Cyprus
- Coordinates: 35°1′40″N 33°14′31″E
- Country: Cyprus
- District: Nicosia District

Population (2001)
  - Total: 369
- Time zone: UTC+2 (EET)
  - Summer (DST): UTC+3 (EEST)

Politiko (Greek: Πολιτικό; Turkish: Politigo) is a village located in the Nicosia District of Cyprus. The hamlet of Filani is part of this municipality.

The centre of the ancient city-kingdom Tamassos is believed to be under the village of Politiko and the nearby Greek Orthodox monastery of "Agios Herakleidios". On a hill in Politiko was the ancient city of Tamasos, whose excavations are visible.

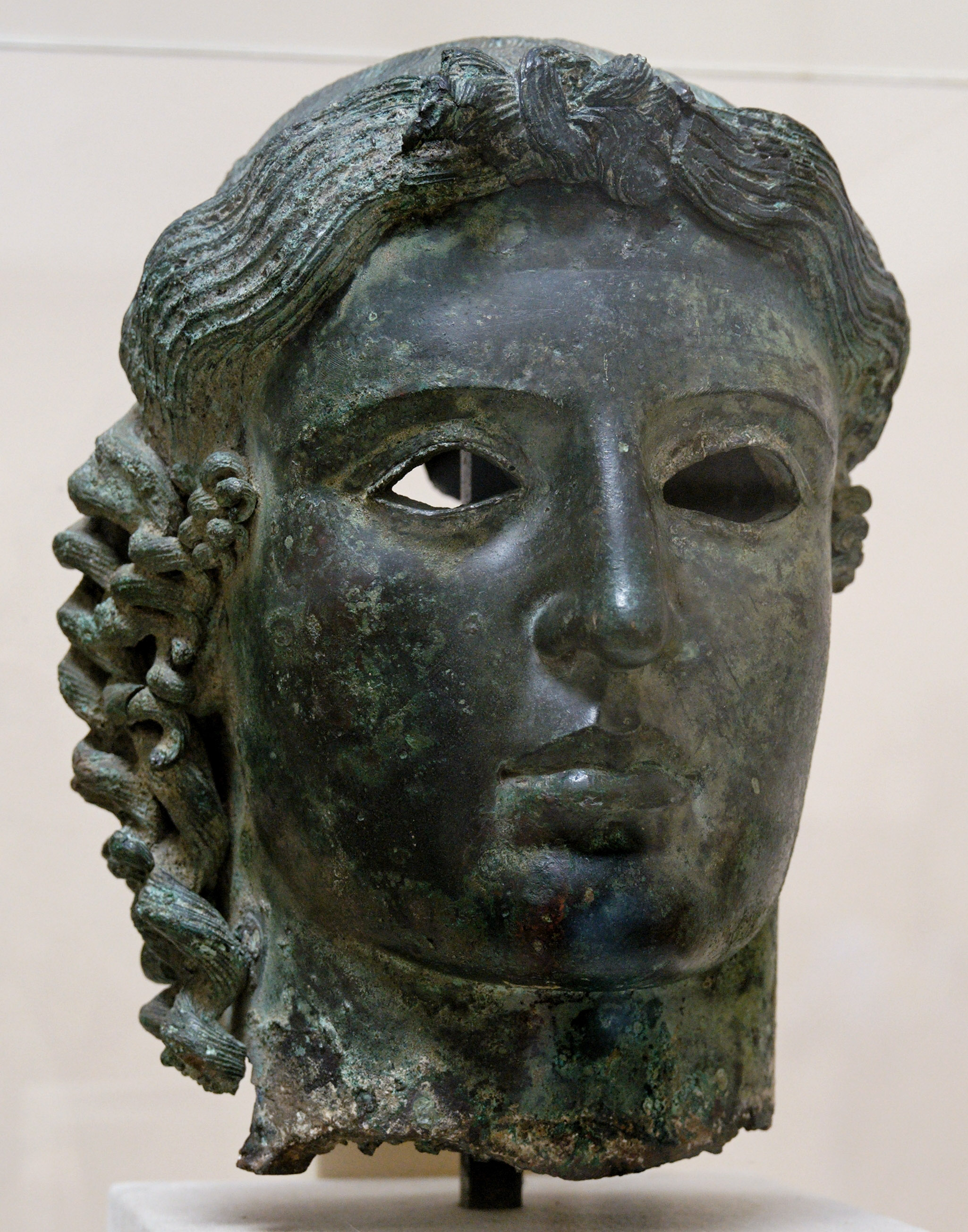
Bronze "Chatsworth Head", probably of Apollo, c. 460 BC, found at Tamassos, 1836, and purchased by the Duke of Devonshire (British Museum)

The monastery of Agios Herakleidios, is dedicated to Saint Heraklidios, a 1st-century Christian who was born in Tamassos, and who accompanied Saint Paul and Saint Barnabas on his trip to Cyprus and was ordained as the first bishop of that place. The church was rebuilt in 18th century, after the original building, which was destroyed in the 5th century.
