= Tamassos =

Ancient city-kingdom of Cyprus

- Ταμασσός (Greek)
- Map showing the ancient city-kingdoms of Cyprus

- Location within Cyprus
- 35.035°N 33.250°E
- Location: Cyprus
- Region: Nicosia District

Site notes
- Management: Cyprus Department of Antiquities

Tamassos (Greek: Ταμασσός) or Tamasos (Greek: Τἀμασος) – names Latinized as Tamassus or Tamasus – was a city-kingdom in ancient Cyprus, one of the ten kingdoms of Cyprus. It was situated in the great central plain of the island, south-east of Soli, on the road from Soli to Tremithus. It is an archaeological site bordering the village of Politiko, about 21 kilometres (13 mi) southwest of Nicosia.

An Assyrian inscription from c. 673 BC (Prism of Esarhaddon) refers to it as Tamesi, described as a city-state which paid tribute to the Neo-Assyrian Empire. As there were copper mines in the neighbourhood, it was probably the Temese mentioned by Homer (Odyssey, I, 184), which was in his time the principal copper market of the island.

Today the villages of Psimolofou, Episkopeio, Pera Orinis, Ergates, Politiko, Kampia, Analyontas, and Kapedes occupy the site of the city.

== History ==
The city-state prospered mainly because of its mines, from which metals (mostly copper, Cyprus's chief export in the ancient world) were extracted. However, it managed to survive despite exhaustion of its copper deposits.

=== Foundations, inhabitants, and economy ===
Unlike other city-states on the island, there is no precise information from either history or tradition concerning the establishment of the city as a human settlement and later as an important trade city.

The area itself was home to a number of small farmer settlements, which the city replaced after the discovery and exploitation of the copper that became the heart of the economy in the succeeding centuries. Studies of the archaeological artefacts suggest that the region was inhabited since prehistoric times, more specifically since the Chalcolithic period. Villages such as Kampia, Margi, Kotsiatis, and Mathiatis in the wider region were densely populated from the Early Bronze Age. The population increased significantly following exploitation of the copper mines. Tombs and copper-processing installations discovered in the area date back to the Late Bronze Age.

Writers such as Ptolemy and Stephanus of Byzantium mention the city. Stephanus describes the city as "mesogeia" (inland) with copper of excellent quality. Its inland location and lack of a port kept it from becoming a major trading post such as Salamis and Paphos. The city also lacked the cosmopolitan character of the island's coastal cities. It resembled an "industrial" city of mines and workshops, though it had without doubt also developed the agricultural and stock-breeding potentialities of the surrounding fertile land, enriched by one of the most important rivers of Cyprus, the Pediaios, and its tributaries.

=== Phoenician and Greek influence ===
The King of Tamassos, Pasikypros, is said to have sold his kingdom to the Phoenicians of Kition for a price of 50 talents. Having received his payment, the King went to spend his last days in Amathus.

Athenaeus claims that Alexander the Great gave the city to Pnytagoras, the King of Salamina, as he had assisted him with the invasion and capture of Tyre. The temple of Aphrodite and perhaps other public buildings were rebuilt at the beginning of the Hellenistic period. It is assumed that there was an alteration to the city character and political structure, and new public buildings built. During the same period, Greeks from various places of the empire came to live in Tamassos. One of these people was Aspendios from Anatolia.

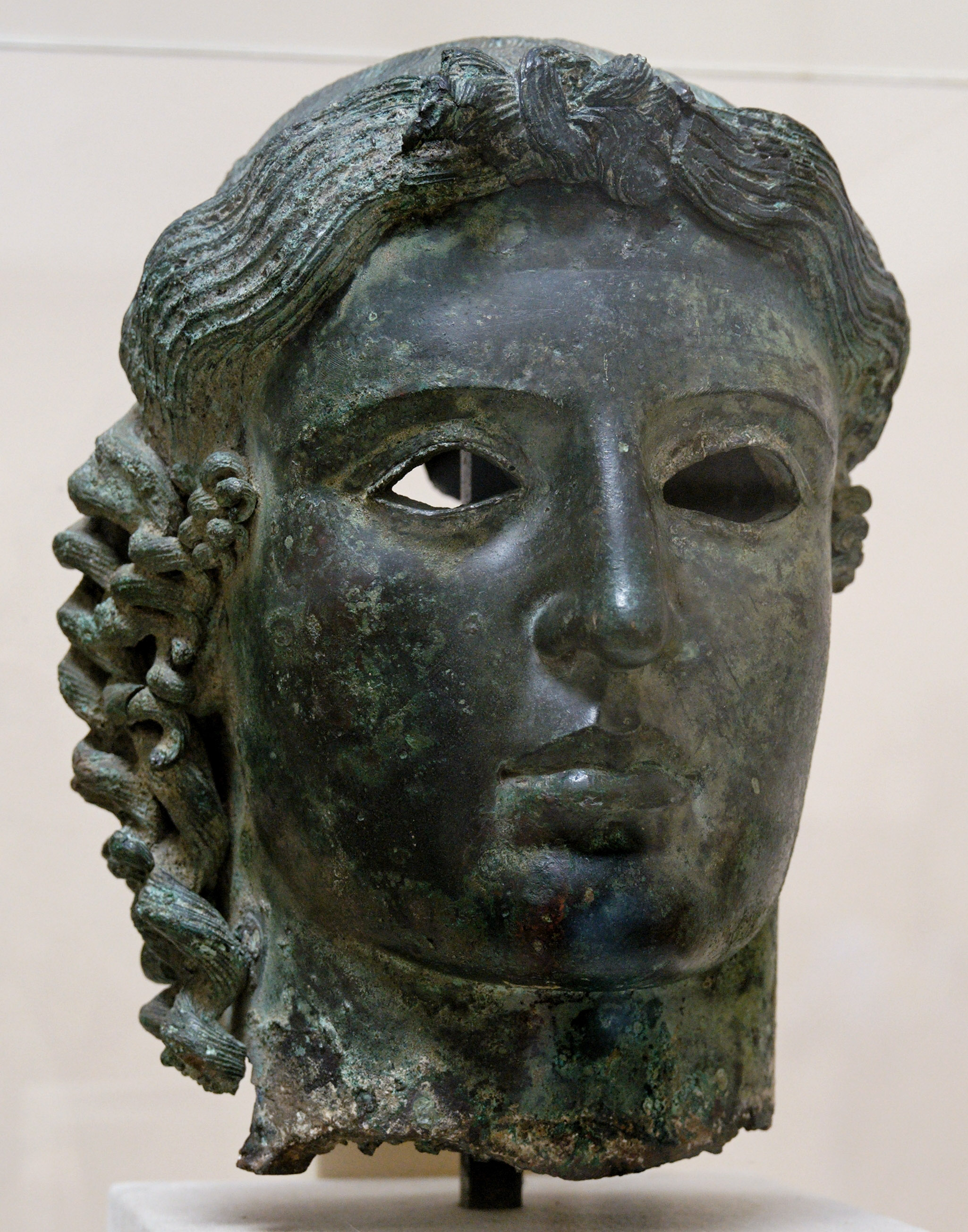
Bronze "Chatsworth Head", probably of Apollo, c. 460 BC, found at Tamassos, 1836, and purchased by the Duke of Devonshire (British Museum)

=== Decline ===
With the spread of Christianity throughout southern Europe, Tamasos became one of the first Greek Orthodox dioceses in Cyprus. The presence of its two first bishops, Saint Herakleidios and Saint Mnason, was prominent. The pseudepigraphical Acts of Barnabas mention Tamasus as the meeting point of Barnabas and Heraclide, made bishop by Barnabas.

Tamassos is referred to as a city of Cyprus until the 10th century AD, but by then it was in decline. The mines were abandoned after their exhaustion, and the economy was destroyed. Much later on, the city was replaced by small settlements such as Politiko and Episkopeio. The name "Politiko" refers to the brilliant ancient city it has replaced, whereas the name "Episkopeio" is reminiscent of Tamassos's old diocese. "Ergates" was named as such because it is the area where the mine workers lived, while "Pera Orinis" is named because it is opposite Politiko ("pera" being Greek for "yonder"), and because it is located in a hilly area ("oreinis" being Greek for "of the mountains" as opposed to the village "Pera Chorio Nisou" which is in the lowlands). It is believed that these settlements are a continuation of ancient Tamassos and that the inhabitation of this region are continuous from the ancient Prehistoric times until present times.

== Archaeological site ==
The centre of the town, which is believed to have been the location of various public buildings and shrines, is thought to be under the village of Politiko and the nearby Greek Orthodox monastery of "Agios Herakleidios". This overlap of modern inhabited sites and ancient remains also means that large-scale archaeological excavations cannot be conducted.

Sporadic excavations between 1970 and 1990 in the outer area resulted in the discovery of many artifacts as well as parts of the original city dating from the Archaic, Classical, and Hellenistic eras. The visible sections of this large and important archaeological site also include the site of the temple of Aphrodite, the two royal tombs, and other graves.

Fortifications which surrounded the city during the Archaic period have also been unearthed, as well as, copper-processing installations, clay and stone statuettes, and various oblation vessels, censers, and oil lamps. A limestone altar was found nearby Aphrodite's temple as well as a temple devoted to Kiveli (the Mother of Gods). The latter was discovered alongside an epigraphic testimony regarding the goddess's worship. In addition, there are various literary references proving the worshipping of Apollo, Aesculap, and Dionysus.

=== Necropolis ===
North-east of Aphrodite's temple lies the necropolis of Tamassos. In addition, three cemeteries are located in the region. One dates back to the Bronze Age/Copper Age, another to the Archaic period, whilst the third belongs to the Hellenistic era and the Roman period.

Most of the Bronze Age cemetery is probably close to the Lambertes barrow (south-east of the Politiko village). South-west of the "Agios Herakleidios" monastery, a tomb belonging to the Middle Bronze era was dug up in 1963. Yet another tomb from the latter part of the Bronze Age was excavated south-east of the monastery, in the region between the present-day nunnery and the Lambertes barrow.

The Archaic era cemetery is located south-west of the village, between the region's two rivers, of which one is the torrential Pediaios, which waters most of Nicosia District and particularly the fertile area of Mesaoria.

The Hellenistic/Roman cemetery is found on a slope north-west of Politiko, where the "Agios Mnason" monastery once existed.

Many shrines also seem to have existed around the ancient city of Tamassos. This can be proven by the presence of the Archaic earthen statue and the Chatsworth Head was found in the area.

Nowadays the two monasteries of Saint Herakleidios and Saint Mnason are believed to be important monuments of the region.

==== Royal tombs ====
The two royal tombs discovered are proof of the city's wealth during the Archaic era, due to their fine construction.

Recently, six unique, undamaged, life-size, limestone, sculptures were discovered in the royal necropolis, of which two represented sphinxes and four represented lions in a crouching position. The exquisite sculptures date from the 6th century BC.

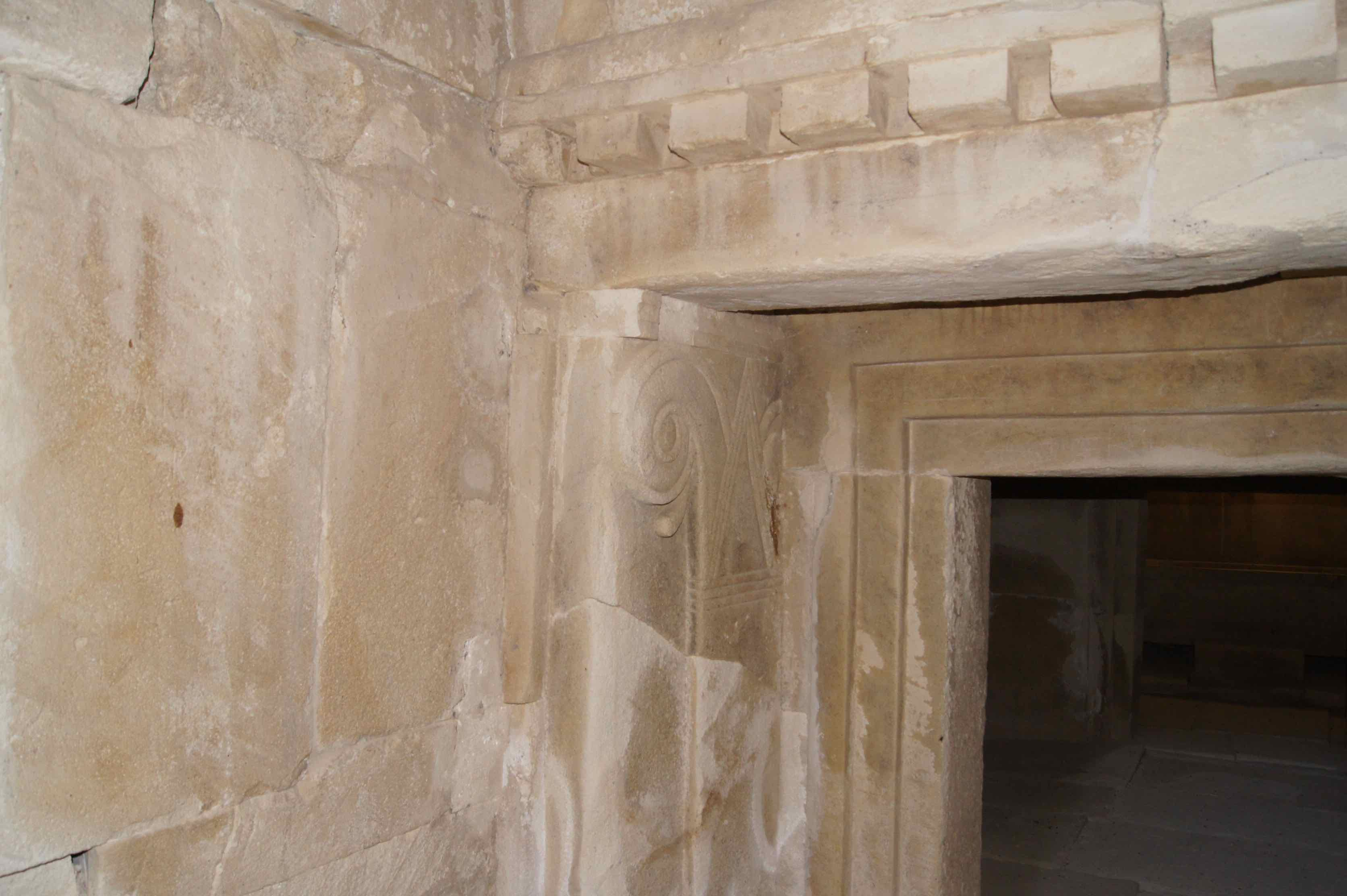
Royal tomb entrance (Tomb 5) with volute (proto-Aeolic) capital, recessed door, lintel, stone imitation of rectangular roof beams

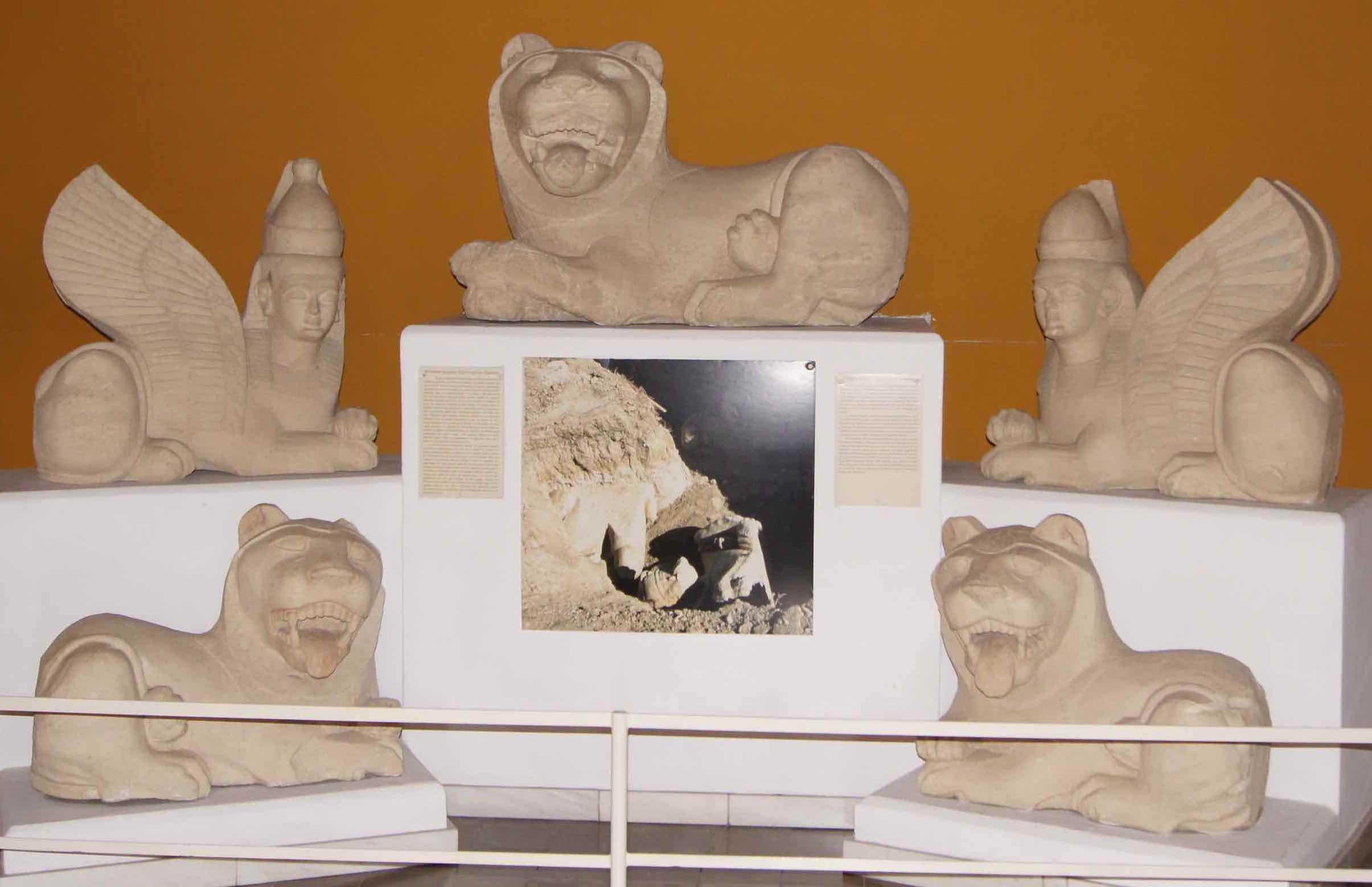
Lions from a royal tomb, Nicosia museum

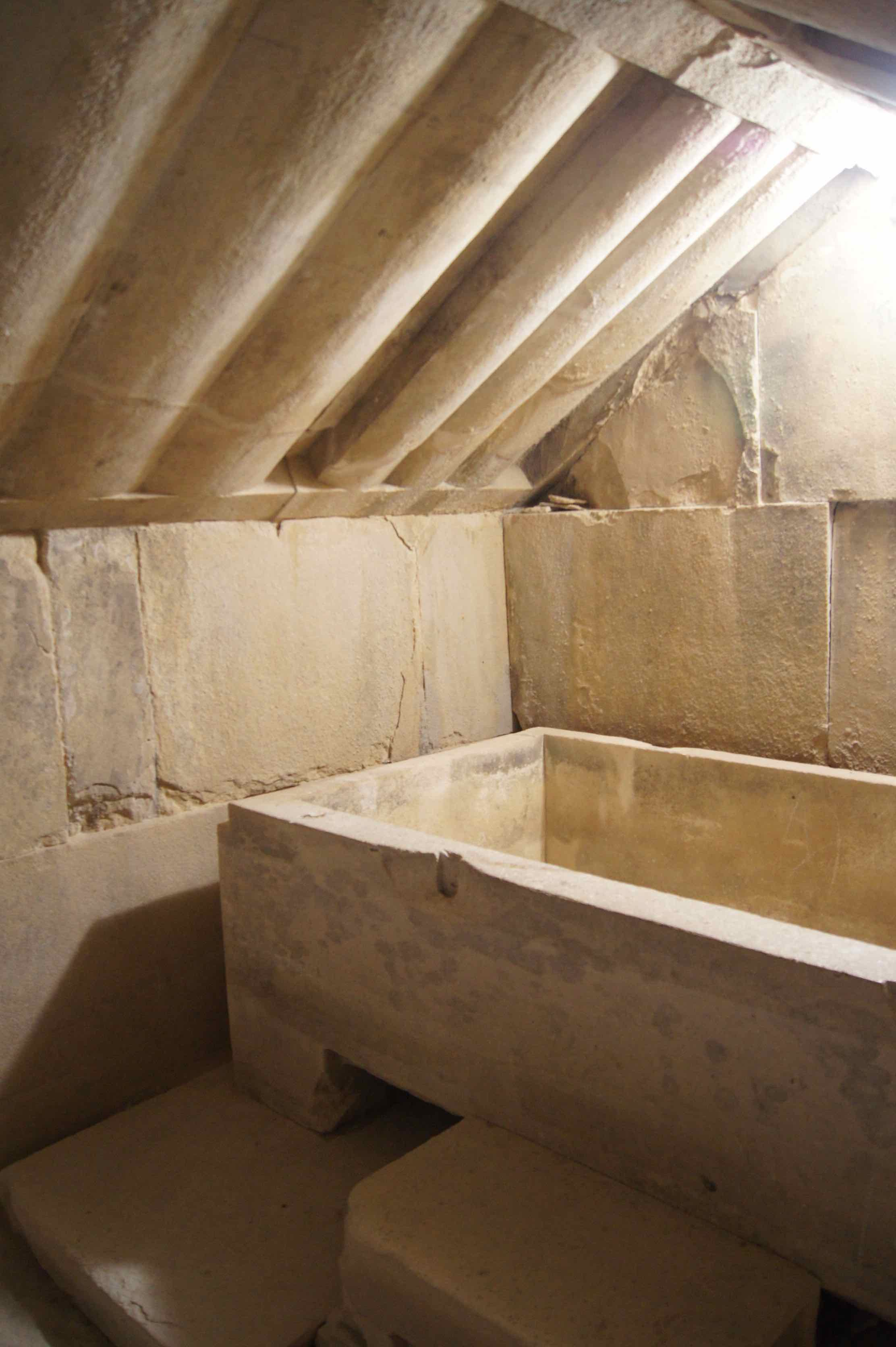
Royal tomb, Tamassos

== Tamassos today ==
The area where Tamassos once stood now is home to the villages of Psimolofou, Episkopeio, Pera Orinis, Ergates, Politiko, Kampia, Analyontas, and Kapedes are located. For the past few centuries, they have developed from being poor agricultural villages housing some 10 families, to populations of 1,000. Pera Orinis and Politiko retain much of the older buildings of the older settlements at the centre of the villages, which are deemed to be of high cultural significance. Highlights of these include the church of Panagia Odigitria, the Old Mill, the Parthenagogion and Arenagogion, as well as the recently restore chapel of St George of Pera Orinis, and the famous Tombs of the Kings of the village of Politiko.

== See also ==
- Tamassos bilinguals
