= Pera Orinis =

Pera: Πέρα (Greek); Pera (Turkish)
- Location in Cyprus
- Coordinates: 35°1′56″N 33°15′11″E
- Country: Cyprus
- District: Nicosia District

Population (2001)
  - Total: 1,018
- Time zone: UTC+2 (EET)
  - Summer (DST): UTC+3 (EEST)

Pera Orinis, or Pera Oreinis or Pera ("Orinis" designates the name of the area "Orinis" to distinguish from villages with the same name in other areas), (Greek: Πέρα Ορεινής or Πέρα; Turkish: Pera) is a village in the area known as Tamassos, which is in turn part of the Nicosia District in Cyprus.

Pera is situated near Tamassos dam (built in 2002 ); about one hour walking distance across the Pedhieos river bank.
