= Larnakas tis Lapithou =

Larnakas tis Lapithou Λάρνακας της Λαπήθου (Greek) Kozan (Turkish)
- Location within Cyprus
- Coordinates: 35°18′32″N 33°08′24″E
- Country (de jure): Cyprus
  - District: Kyrenia District
- Country (de facto): Northern Cyprus
  - District: Girne District

Population (2011)
  - Total: 375

Larnakas tis Lapithou (Greek: Λάρνακας της Λαπήθου; Turkish: Kozan) is a village in Cyprus, near the town of Lapithos. It is under the de facto control of Northern Cyprus. The Anat Athena bilingual Greek-Phoenician inscription was found near the village in the 19th century.

Until 1911, Larnakas tis Lapithou had a Muslim minority. They are said to have had relocated to nearby Kampyli. In 1973, Larnakas tis Lapithou had an estimated population of 873, consisting entirely of Greek Cypriots. All were displaced to the south of Cyprus in 1974. Today, it is inhabited by displaced Turkish Cypriots from various villages in Paphos District.

== Literature ==
- Lisa Dikomitis: Cyprus and its Places of Desire. Cultures of Displacement Among Greek and Turkish Cypriot Refugees. I. B. Tauris, London/New York 2012, ISBN 978-1-84885-899-2.
