= Oyebanji Filani =

Health Commissioner of Ekiti State since 2022

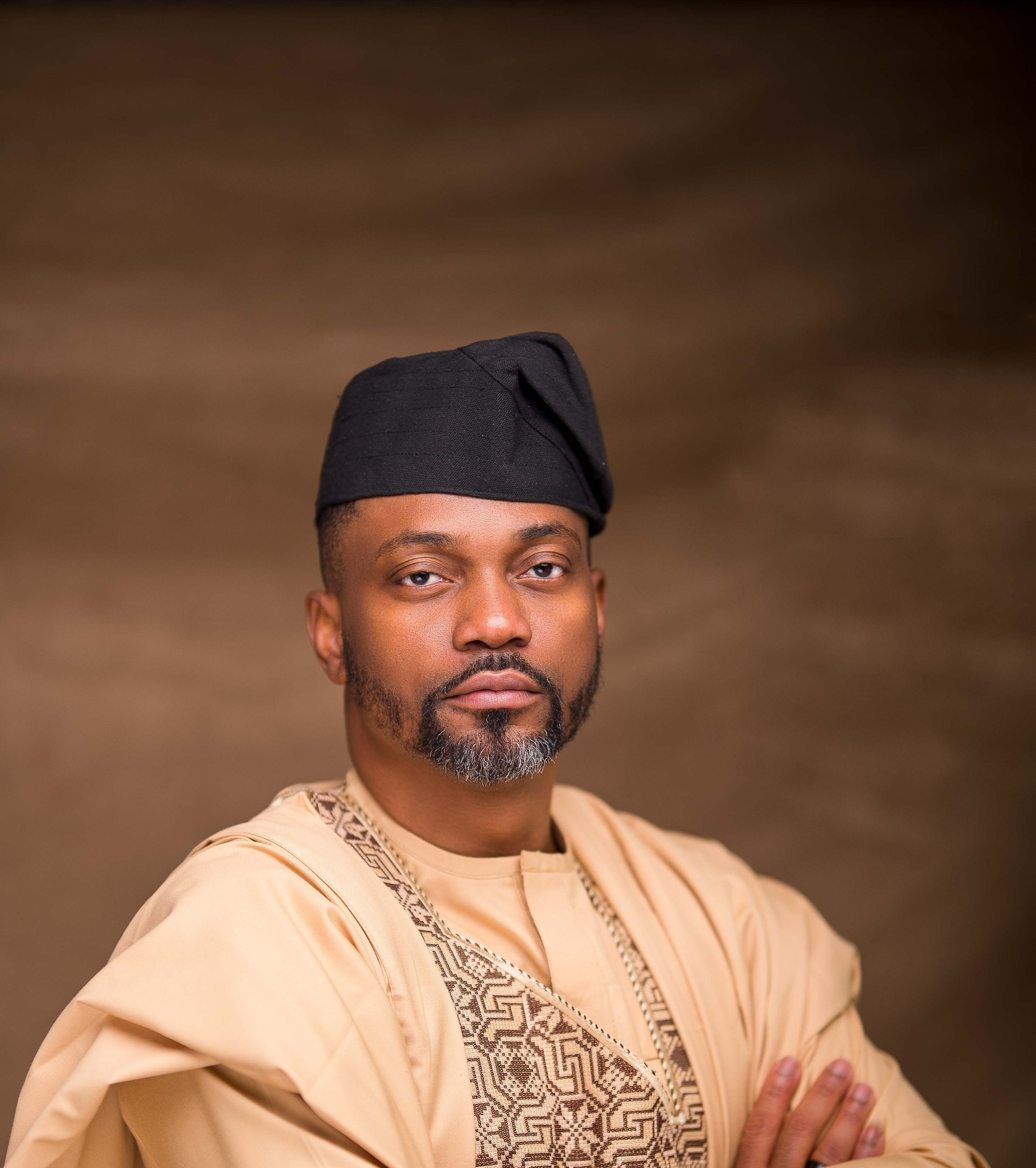

Commissioner of Health and Human Services
- Appointed by: Biodun Oyebanji
- Governor: Biodun Oyebanji
- Governor: Kayode Fayemi

Personal details
- Education: University of Lagos

Oyebanji Filani is a Nigerian physician and health economist who has served as the Ekiti State commissioner of Health and Human Services since his appointment by governor Biodun Oyebanji in 2022. He is also the chairperson of Nigeria health commissioners forum, comprising all commissioners of health from the 36 states in the country, including Yobe, Niger, Ekiti, Kaduna, Sokoto and Nasarawa.

== Education ==
Oyebanji after graduating from high school gained admission into the College of Medicine, University of Lagos in 1999 where he obtained a MBBS: Medicine and Surgery in 2006. He also has a degree in Health Economics and Health Policy from the University of Birmingham, United Kingdom.

== Early career ==
Between 2009 and 2010, he worked as a medical service and quality assurance officer at Expatcare Health International, a Health Maintenance Organization. In this role, he led the coordination, implementation, and monitoring of managed care operations, medical services delivery, and quality assurance mechanisms for the organization. Later in 2010 and 2013, he worked with the Health Economics Consulting Norwich UK, where he applied the principles of economic analysis in shaping policy and programming. Whilst in the UK, he also led the analysis of knock-on costs for non-cancer screening programs initiated by the UK’s National Health Service (NHS), with a view to strengthening health service delivery. In 2013, working with the Children’s Investment Fund Foundation (CIFF) UK and Results for Development (R4D), he co-led the fiscal space analysis on total government health expenditure for the Saving One Million Lives (SOML) interventions, appraised the country’s health strategic plan and co-developed an advocacy report to support the drive for increased domestic resource spending for health. Working with other stakeholders, he was involved in the development of the Nigerian Strategic Action Plan for Nutrition. In 2014, he co-designed a Federal level Flagship Social Protection Program and co-developed the concept document and cost model for the program, working with a multi-sectoral team with representations from 11 Ministries, Departments, and Agencies.

== Political career ==
In 2020, he was appointed as the Commissioner for Health and Human Services in Ekiti State, Nigeria by the former governor, Dr Kayode Fayemi during his leadership the ministry facilitated health care financing partnership between the state government and private investors resulting to increase in the state's healthcare portfolio. Under his leadership, Ekiti State was recognized as the best-performing state in the country for disease surveillance and response according to Nigeria National Center for Disease Control. Through his systems-thinking approach in addressing health service delivery in Ekiti State, it led to the establishment of Nigeria's first Governance Innovation Accelerator Challenge in partnership with the Massachusetts Institute of Technology Governance Lab and Co-Creation Hub.

In October 2022, he was re-appointed as the Commissioner for Health and Human Services in Ekiti State. Oyebanji also serves as the Chairperson of the Nigeria Health Commissioners Forum, where he guides his colleagues on critical sub-national health systems reform issues at the sub-national level. Since he assumed this role, he has helped guide and shape the forum, by enhancing coordination, and creating a system to address common challenges in health governance and service delivery at the sub-national level. In 2023, he hosted one of the top healthcare events in Nigeria, the National Council on Health event in Ado-Ekiti, Ekiti State during the 64th edition of the meeting from November 13 to 17, 2023.

Dr. Oyebanji Filani has made contributed positively in the improvement of the state's health sector during his tenure as commissioner. He ensured that Ekiti State Government commits to elimination of malaria, reduction in child and maternal mortalities through the establishment of “Ulerawa” – a flagship health insurance program designed to take care of people in that category. Under Ulerawa scheme, residents of Ekiti can access explicit and guaranteed package high impact services, delivered at public primary health centres in the 177 wards of the state. Under his watch, the State Government approved the increase of health workers salaries, empowered health workers with essential tools for productivity and service quality within the state’s healthcare sector, donated to poor patients who are citizens to offset their medical bills, equipped medical facilities across the 16 LGAs in the state, and secured a partnership with the Nigeria Center for disease control (NCDC) resulting, in the establishment of Southwest Zonal Health Laboratory, serving Ekiti and other Southwest states, as well as Kogi and Kwara States. Oyebanji ensured Ekiti State attained a COVID-19 free status, he introduced and inaugurated NYSC Doctors Fellowship in Ekiti State, a program designed to strengthen the capacity of young health workers while supporting delivery of quality services in underserved PHCs.
