= List of universities and colleges in Cyprus =

This is a list of universities and colleges in Cyprus, including campuses of foreign universities.

== Universities ==
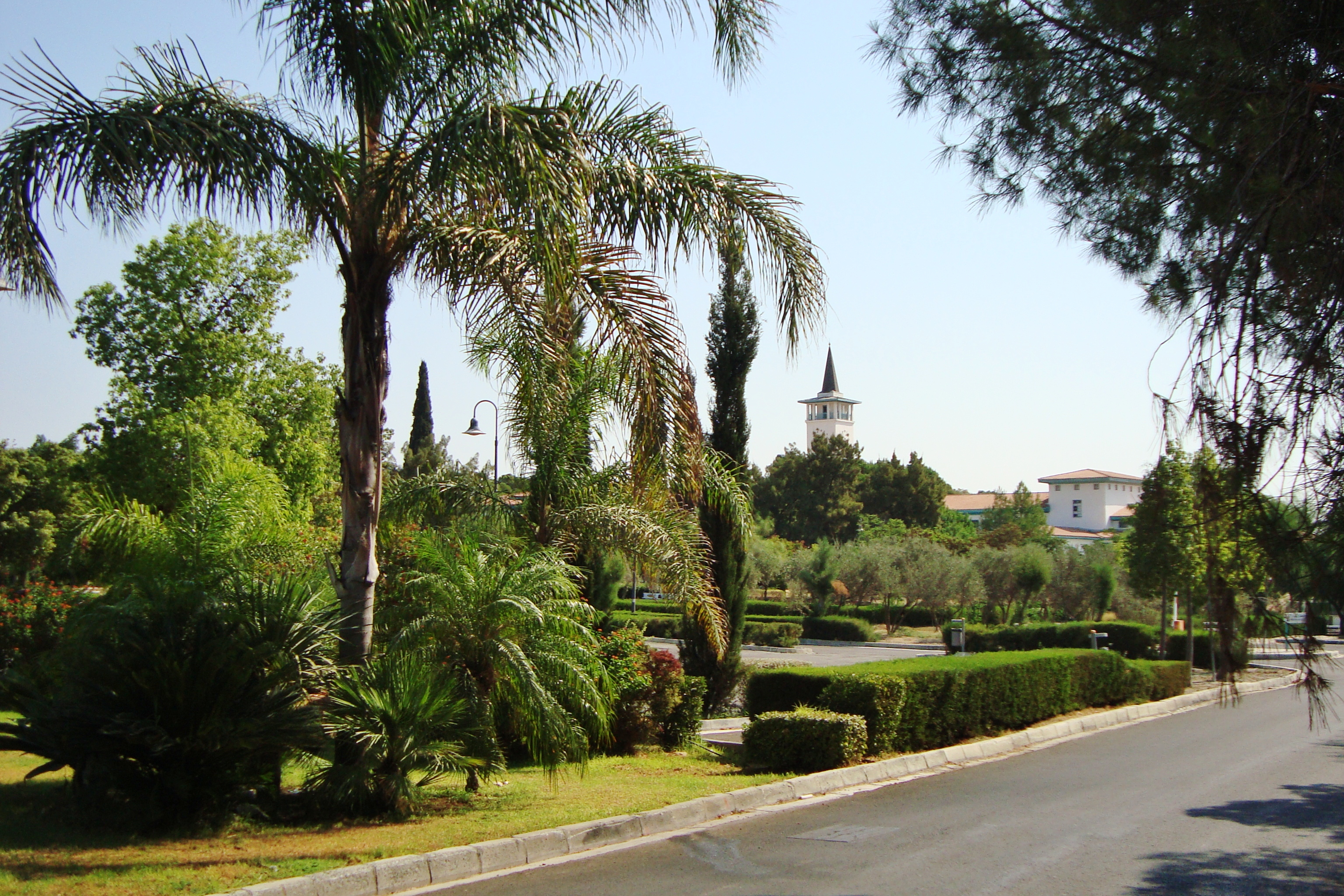
University of Cyprus

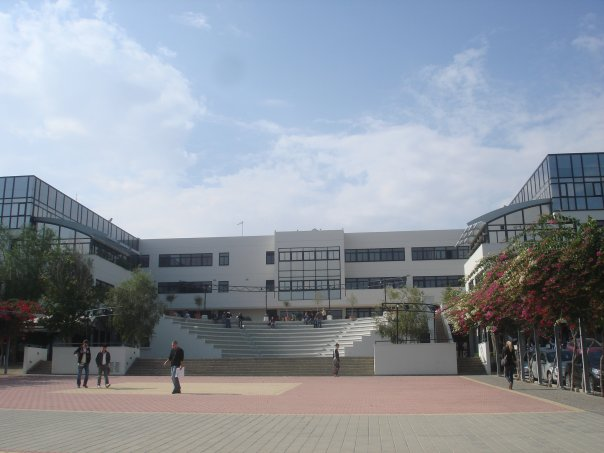
University of Nicosia

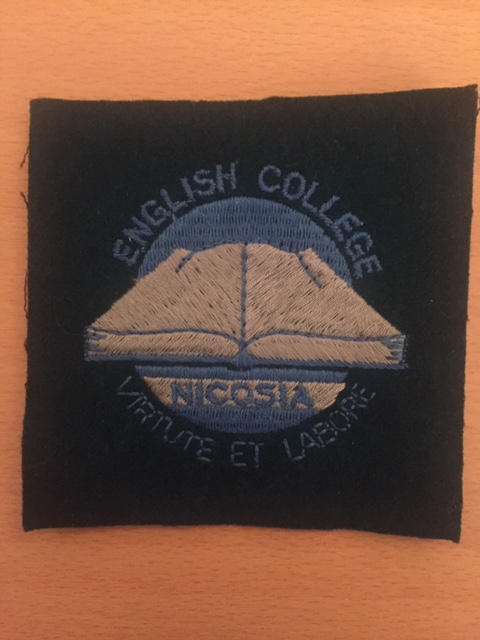
The Nicosia College Badge.

Name	Location	Name in Greek	Name in Turkish	Type
Philips University	Nicosia	Πανεπιστήμιο Philips	Philips Üniversitesi	Private
University Of City Island	Famagusta	Πανεπιστήμιο Άντα Κεντ	Ada Kent Üniversitesi	Private
Cyprus West University	Famagusta	Δυτικό Πανεπιστήμιο Κύπρου	Kıbrıs Batı Üniversitesi	Private
UCLan Cyprus (branch campus of University of Lancashire)	Larnaka	Πανεπιστήμιο UCLan Κύπρου (UCLan Cyprus)	Orta Lancashire Üniversitesi/Kıbrıs	Private
University of Cyprus	Nicosia	Πανεπιστήμιο Κύπρου (ΠΚ)	Kıbrıs Üniversitesi	National
European Leadership University	Famagusta	Ευρωπαϊκό Πανεπιστήμιο Ηγεσίας	Avrupa Liderlik Üniversitesi	Private
Eastern Mediterranean University	Famagusta	Ανατολικό Μεσόγειο Πανεπιστήμιο	Doğu Akdeniz Üniversitesi	State-trust-run
Cyprus University of Technology	Limassol	Τεχνολογικό Πανεπιστήμιο Κύπρου (ΤΕ.ΠΑ.Κ.)	Kıbrıs Teknoloji Üniversitesi	National
Open University of Cyprus	Nicosia	Ανοικτό Πανεπιστήμιο Κύπρου	Kıbrıs Açık Üniversitesi	National
European University Cyprus	Nicosia	Ευρωπαϊκό Πανεπιστήμιο Κύπρου	Kıbrıs Avrupa Üniversitesi	Private
Frederick University	Nicosia, Limassol, Larnaca	Πανεπιστήμιο Φρειδερίκου	Frederick Üniversitesi	Private
University of Nicosia	Nicosia, Limassol, Larnaca	Πανεπιστήμιο Λευκωσίας	Lefkoşa Üniversitesi	Private
European University of Lefke	Lefka	Ευρωπαϊκό Πανεπιστήμιο Λεύκα	Lefke Avrupa Üniversitesi	State
Neapolis University Paphos	Paphos	Πανεπιστήμιο Νεάπολις	Baf Neapolis Üniversitesi	Private
American University of Cyprus	Nicosia	Αμερικανικό Πανεπιστήμιο της Κύπρου	Kıbrıs Amerikan Üniversitesi	Private
Cyprus International University	Nicosia	Διεθνές Πανεπιστήμιο Κύπρου	Uluslarası Kıbrıs Üniversitesi	Private
Near East University	Nicosia	Εγγύς Ανατολικό Πανεπιστήμιο	Yakın Doğu Üniversitesi	Private
Girne American University	Kyrenia	Αμερικανικό Πανεπιστήμιο Girne	Girne Amerikan Üniversitesi	Private
University of Kyrenia	Kyrenia	Πανεπιστήμιο Κερύνειας	Girne Üniversitesi	Private
Cyprus Science University	Kyrenia	Πανεπιστήμιο Επιστημών Κύπρου	Kıbrıs İlim Üniversitesi	Private
American University of Beirut – Mediterraneo	Paphos	Αμερικανικό Πανεπιστήμιο Βηρυτού-Mediterraneo	Amerikan Üniversitesi Beyrut-Akdeniz	Private
American University of Cyprus (AUCY)	Larnaca	Αμερικανικό Πανεπιστήμιο Κύπρου (AUCY)	Kıbrıs Amerikan Üniversitesi (AUCY)	Private
University of Mediterranean Karpasia	Karpasia	Μεσογειακό Πανεπιστήμιο Κάρπας	Akdeniz Karpaz Üniversitesi	Private

For the full list of universities and colleges in Northern Cyprus, see.

== Foreign university campuses in Cyprus ==
Name	Location in Cyprus	Country of origin
Middle East Technical University	Morphou	TR
Istanbul Technical University	Famagusta	TR
Anadolu University	Nicosia	TR
Social Sciences University of Ankara	Nicosia	TR
University of Lancashire	Pyla	UK
University of the West of England	Larnaca	UK
University of the West of Scotland	Nicosia	UK

== Ecclesiastical schools ==
The Cyprus Church Theological School (ΘΣΕΚ) was founded as a private school on June 19, 2015. It is under the auspices of the Church of Cyprus and will give students a theological education with the possibility of the scientific work and critical discussion. This degree course enables candidates to engage in the Orthodox priesthood.

== Private Institutions of Tertiary Education ==
- American College (Nicosia)
- Aigaia School of Art and Design
- Alexander College
- Arte Music Academy
- Atlantis College
- Casa College
- CBS - College of Business Studies Cyprus
- CDA College
- Church of Cyprus - School of Theology
- City Unity College Nicosia
- Cyprus Academy of Art
- Cyprus College
- Cyprus International Institute of Management
- Cyprus School of Molecular Medicine
- Frederick Institute of Technology
- Freshart College of Arts
- Global College
- Institute of Professional Studies (IPS), UCLan Cyprus
- Intercollege
- InterNapa College (Ammochostos)
- KES College
- Larnaca College (Larnaka)
- Ledra College
- Mesoyios College (Lemesos)
- M.K.C. City College Larnaca (Larnaka)
- P.A. College (Larnaka)
- Susini College
- The CTL EuroCollege (Lemesos)
- The Cyprus Institute
- The Cyprus Institute of Marketing
- The Limassol College - T.L.C. (Lemesos)
- The Philips College
- Vladimiros Kafkaridis School of Drama

== Defunct ==
- Higher Technical Institute

== See also ==
- Cyprus Academy of Sciences, Letters and Arts
- Education in Cyprus
- List of schools in Cyprus

== Sources ==
- Complete list of colleges and universities in Cyprus
- Top Universities in Cyprus
