= Education in Cyprus =

Education in Cyprus is overseen by the Ministry of Education, Sports and Youth.

The education system is divided into pre-primary education (ages 3–6), primary education (ages 6–12), secondary education (ages 12–18) and higher education (ages 18+). Full-time education is compulsory for all children aged between 5 and 15. State-provided schooling including higher education is paid for by taxes.

There is also a parallel system of accredited independent schooling, and parents may choose to educate their children by any suitable means. Private school and university fees are not usually covered by the state.

Higher education often begins with a four-year bachelor's degree. Postgraduate degrees include master's degrees, either taught or by research, and the doctorate, a research degree that usually takes at least three years. Universities require accreditation by the Cyprus Agency of Quality Assurance and Accreditation in Higher Education in order to issue degrees.

== Primary education ==
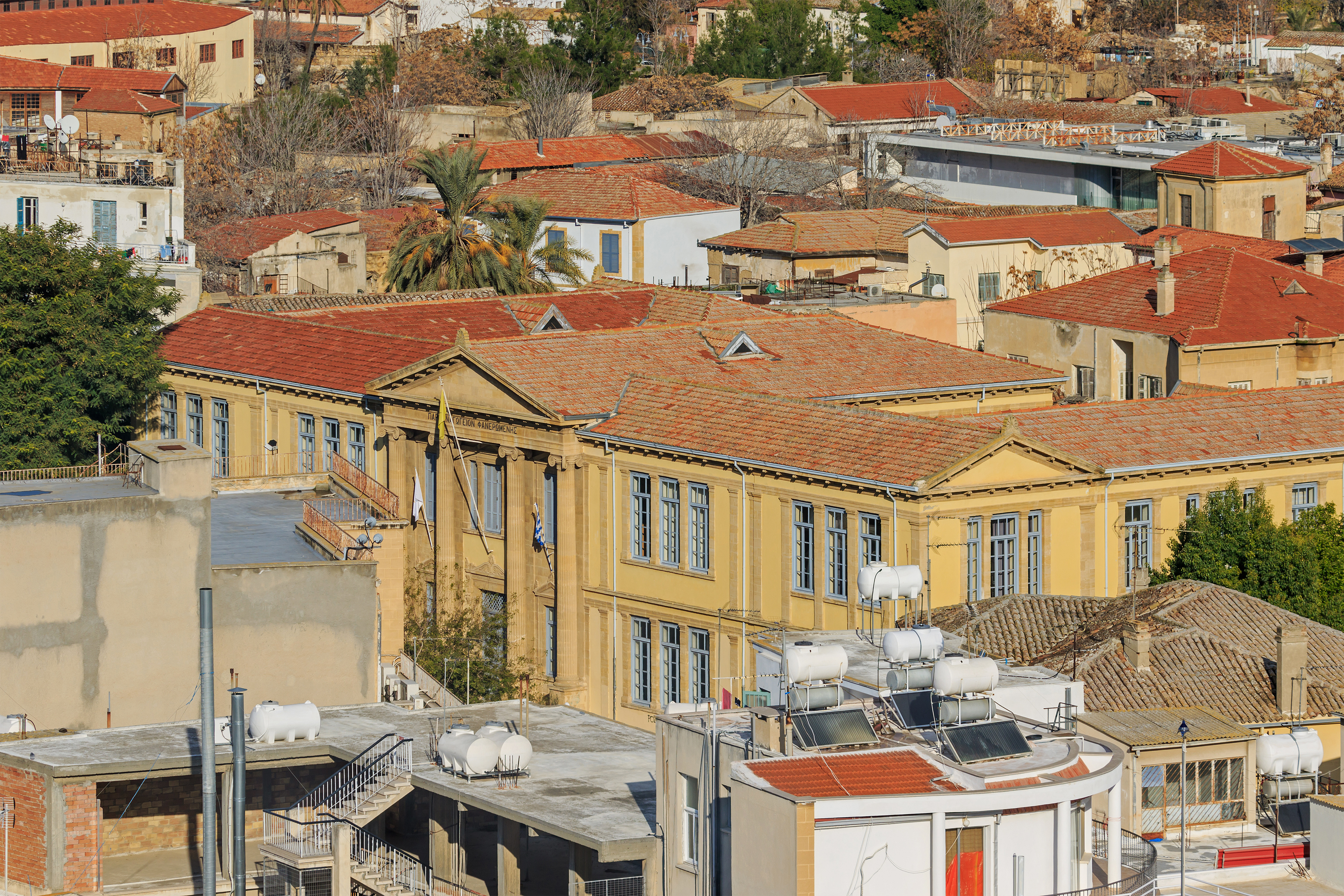
Faneromeni Primary School

In the 2017-2018 academic year, there were 334 primary schools with 56,700 students and 3,980 teachers.

== Secondary education ==
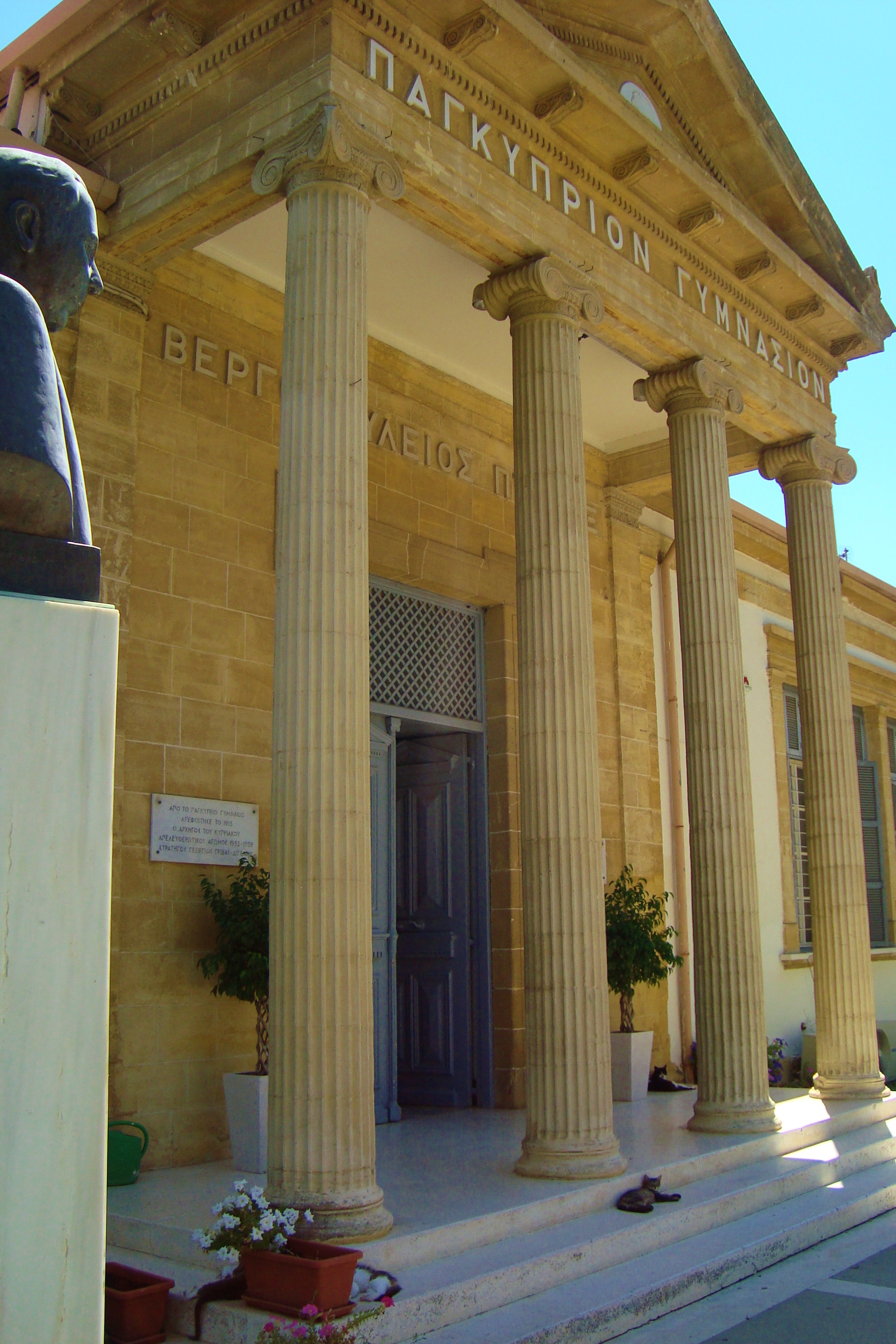
The Pancyprian Gymnasium

== Higher education ==
Higher, or tertiary education is provided by a network of state and private universities and colleges. Private universities were first accredited in 2005 and require a special licence to operate and award degrees. This was set out in the 2005 Private Universities law.

Currently the following universities have a licence by the Ministry of Education and Culture to issue academic degrees:

=== Public Universities ===
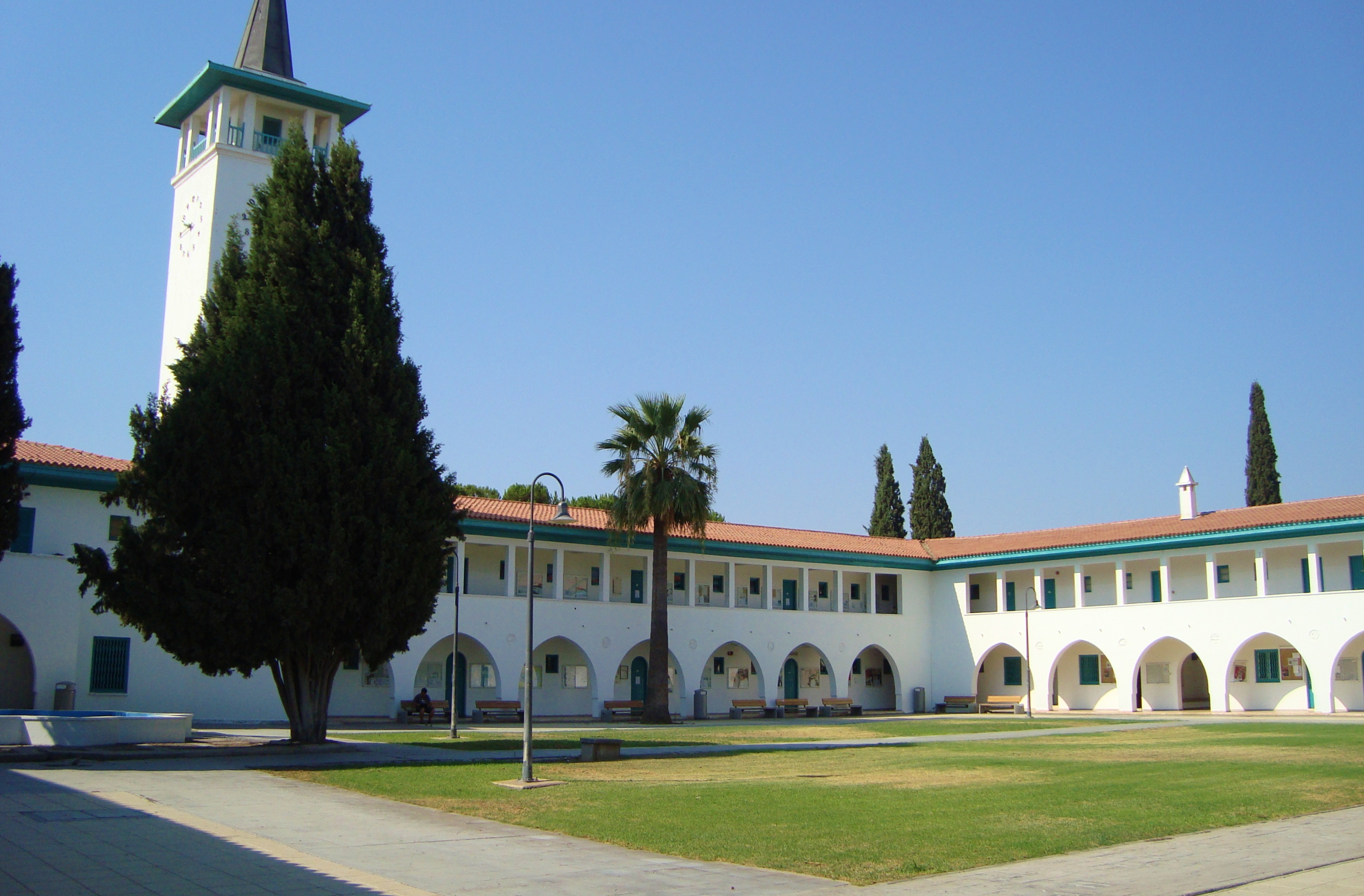
University of Cyprus

1. University of Cyprus
2. Open University of Cyprus
3. Cyprus University of Technology

=== Private Universities ===
1. Cyprus West University
2. European University Cyprus
3. Frederick University
4. Neapolis University
5. Cyprus branch of University of Central Lancashire
6. University of Nicosia
7. American University of Beirut – Mediterraneo Campus in Cyprus
8. Philips University

=== Private Institutions of Tertiary Education ===
1. A.C. American College
2. ACC AKADEMIA COLLEGE
3. Aigaia School of Art and Design
4. Alexander College
5. Arte Music Academy
6. Atlantis College
7. Casa College
8. CBS – College of Business Studies
9. C.D.A. College
10. Church of Cyprus - School of Theology
11. City Unity College Nicosia
12. College of Tourism & Hotel Management
13. Cyprus College
14. Cyprus International Institute of Management
15. Cyprus School of Molecular Medicine
16. Frederick Institute of Technology
17. Global College
18. Institute of Professional Studies (IPS), UCLan Cyprus
19. Intercollege
20. InterNapa College
21. KES College
22. Larnaca College
23. Ledra College
24. Mesoyios College
25. Neapolis College
26. P.A. College
27. Susini College
28. The CTL EuroCollege
29. The Cyprus Academy of Art
30. The Cyprus Institute
31. The Cyprus Institute of Marketing
32. The Limassol College - T.L.C.
33. The Philips College
34. Vladimiros Kafkaridis School of Drama

=== Public Institutions of Tertiary Education ===
1. The Higher Hotel Institute of Cyprus
2. The Cyprus Forestry College
3. The Mediterranean Institute of Management
4. The Police Academy
5. The School for Tourist Guides
6. The Public School of Higher Vocational Education and Training (MIEEK)

== Technical and Vocational Education and Training (TVET) ==
Technical and vocational training (TVET) addresses multiple demands of an economic, social and environmental nature by helping young people and adults to develop the skills they need for employment, decent work, and entrepreneurship, promoting equitable, inclusive and sustainable economic growth, and supporting transitions to green economies and environmental sustainability.

The Human Resource Development Authority of Cyprus (HRDA) is the body in charge of managing training funds in Cyprus. The system relies on contributions paid by all employees, with the exception of the self-employed and government workers. By law the Human Resource Development Levy rate cannot exceed 1% of the emoluments paid to each employee. In practice, the levy rate is 0.5% of payroll, with a monthly cap of €4,533 (Regulation 509/2012).

The HRDA issues grants to employers for approved training as well as allowances to trainees and financial assistance for obtaining training equipment. The HRDA subsidizes 80% of the cost of training, rising to 100% for ‘high-priority multi-company training programmes’.

== See also ==
- List of ministers of education and culture of Cyprus
- Secondary education in Cyprus
- List of schools in Cyprus
- List of universities and colleges in Cyprus

== Sources ==
This article incorporates text from a free content work. Licensed under CC BY-SA 3.0 IGO. Text taken from Funding skills development: the private sector contribution, UNESCO, UNESCO. UNESCO.
