= Halki Theological School Gardens =

Garden in Heybeliada, Turkey

Coordinates: 40°52′57″N 29°05′43″E

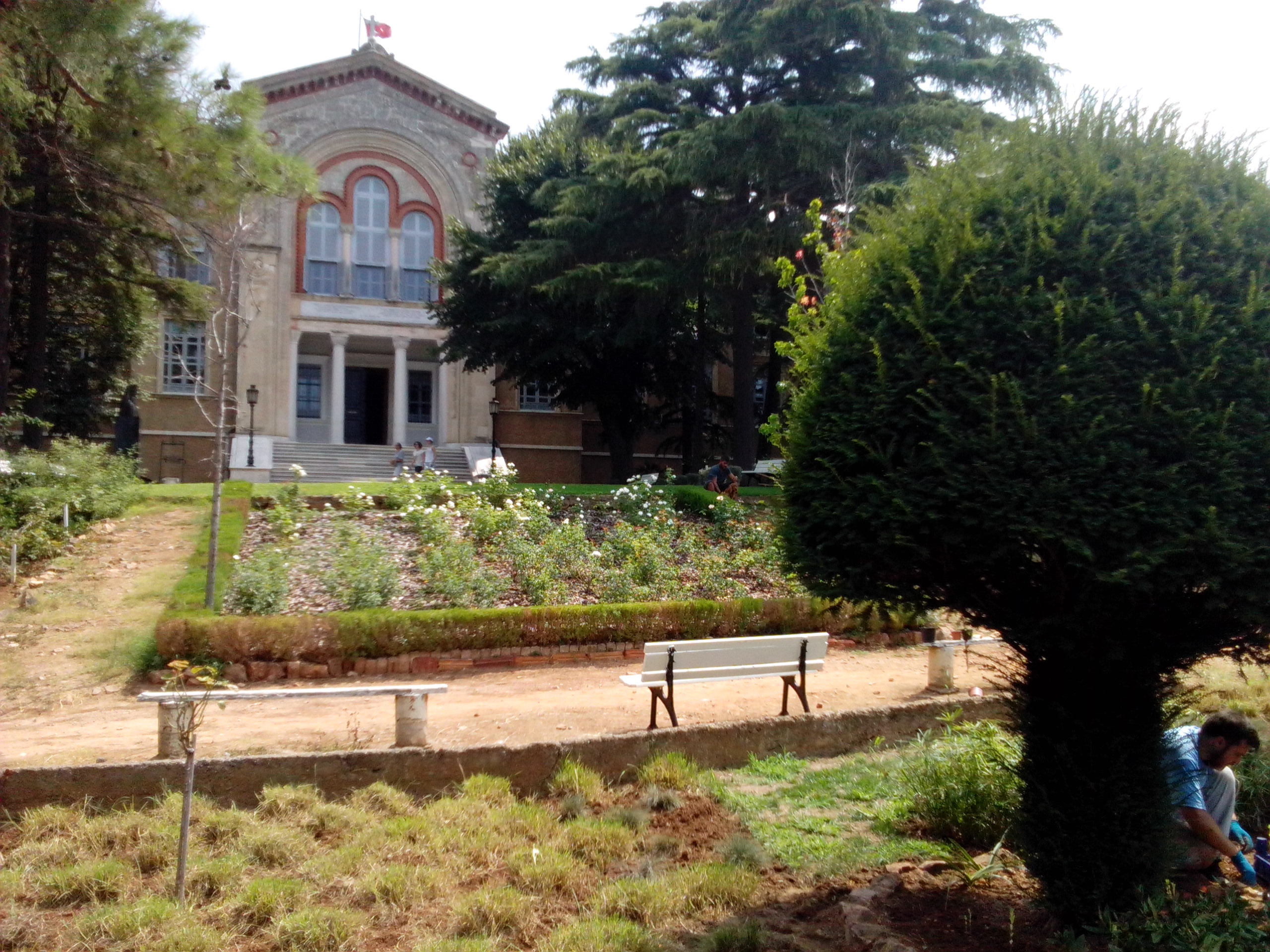
The Garden of Entrance of Halki Seminary

The Halki Theological School Gardens are located in the top of the Hill of Hope in Heybeliada (Halki island) in Turkey. Halki seminary, also known as Halki theological school, was built in 1844 as the lighthouse of Ecumenical Patriarchate of Constantinople. Due to its closure in 1971, it the Byzantine Church of Holy Trinity is open to the public.

The site retained no significant gardens after 1971. Reconstruction began in 2013 based on research of Landscape Architecture Laboratory of Neapolis University Paphos under the supervision of Professor Nerantzia Tzortzi after the invitation of the Abbot of Monastery of Holy Trinity and Bishop of Bursa, Elpidophoros.

== Garden thematics ==
The goal was to create a thematic garden divided in symbolic areas, unique for a cloister, based on the Byzantine garden model:

=== Trail of Virtues ===
The Trail of Virtues is a garden path based on a 12th-century text, written by Codex Oxoniensis Clarkianus 39 and it was recently located in Oxford. The particular route is expected to showcase 14 plants, planted at the school's entrance, in an attempt to help reach a devout state of mind, thus, fit to the school environment.

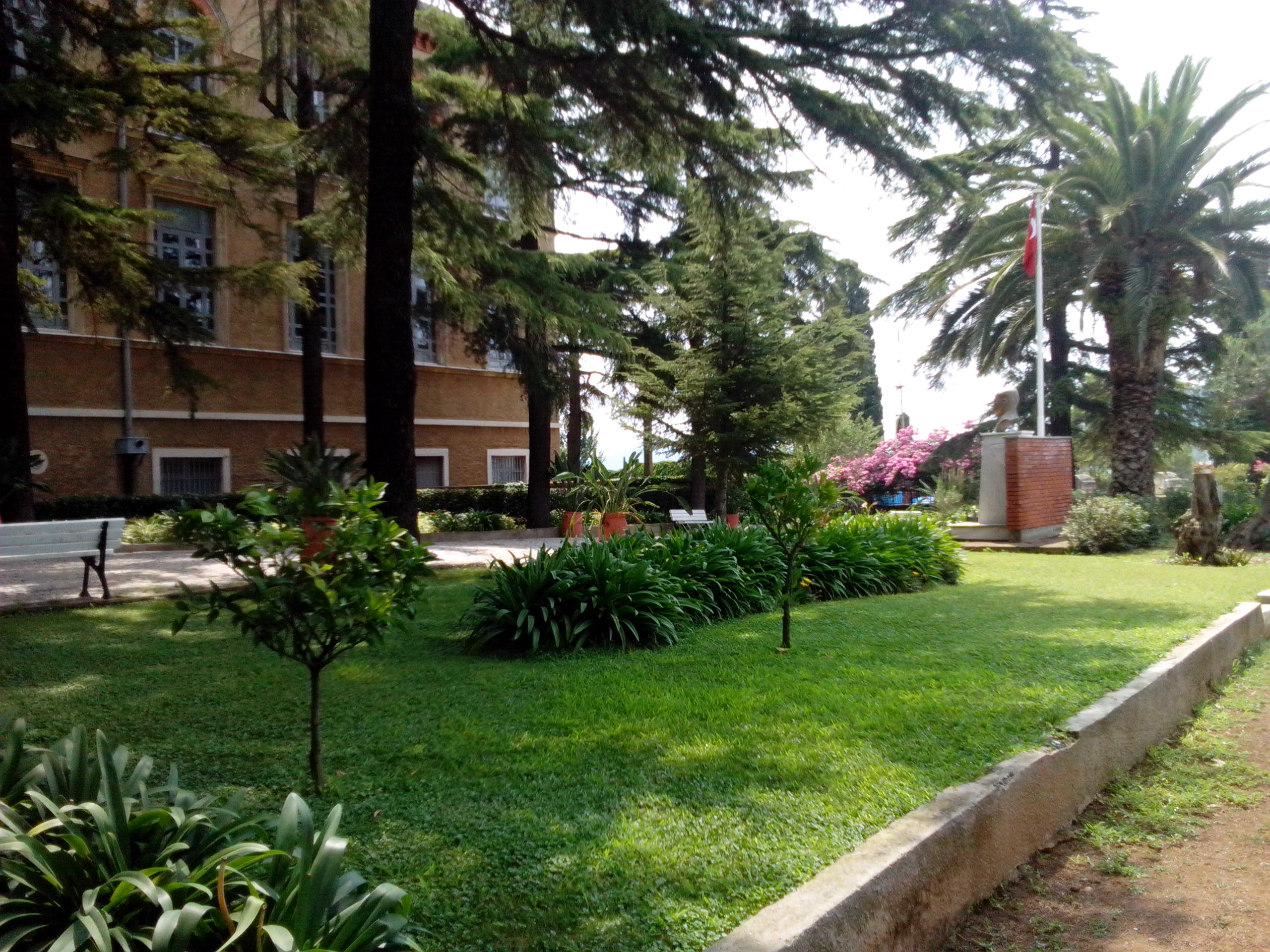
View from the garden of Virtues

The plants and the virtues they linked to are as follows:

- Cedrus libani–Pinus halepensis–Cupressus sempervirens.... Self-discipline
- Citrus sinensis.... Prudence
- Phoenix dactylifera.... Justice
- Lilium candidum.... Indigence
- Ficus carica..... Gentleness
- Vitis vinifera..... Calmness
- Punica granatum... Courage
- Prunus persica.... Humility
- Liquidambar orientalis... Prayer
- Smilax aspera.... Knowledge
- Olea europaea.... Charity
- Rubus idaeus.... Obedience

=== Edible garden ===
The edible garden is a botanical synthesis, combining fruit trees, vegetables and herbs and is highlighted by a biodynamic vineyard. The garden represents an effort to cultivate food items and is situated at the garden's perimeter, as reminder of Hortus conclusus pattern.

=== Garden of Bible ===
The garden of Bible includes 66 out of the 82 plants that are mentioned in the Bible. Most of them are planted around the church, with some scattered around the garden.

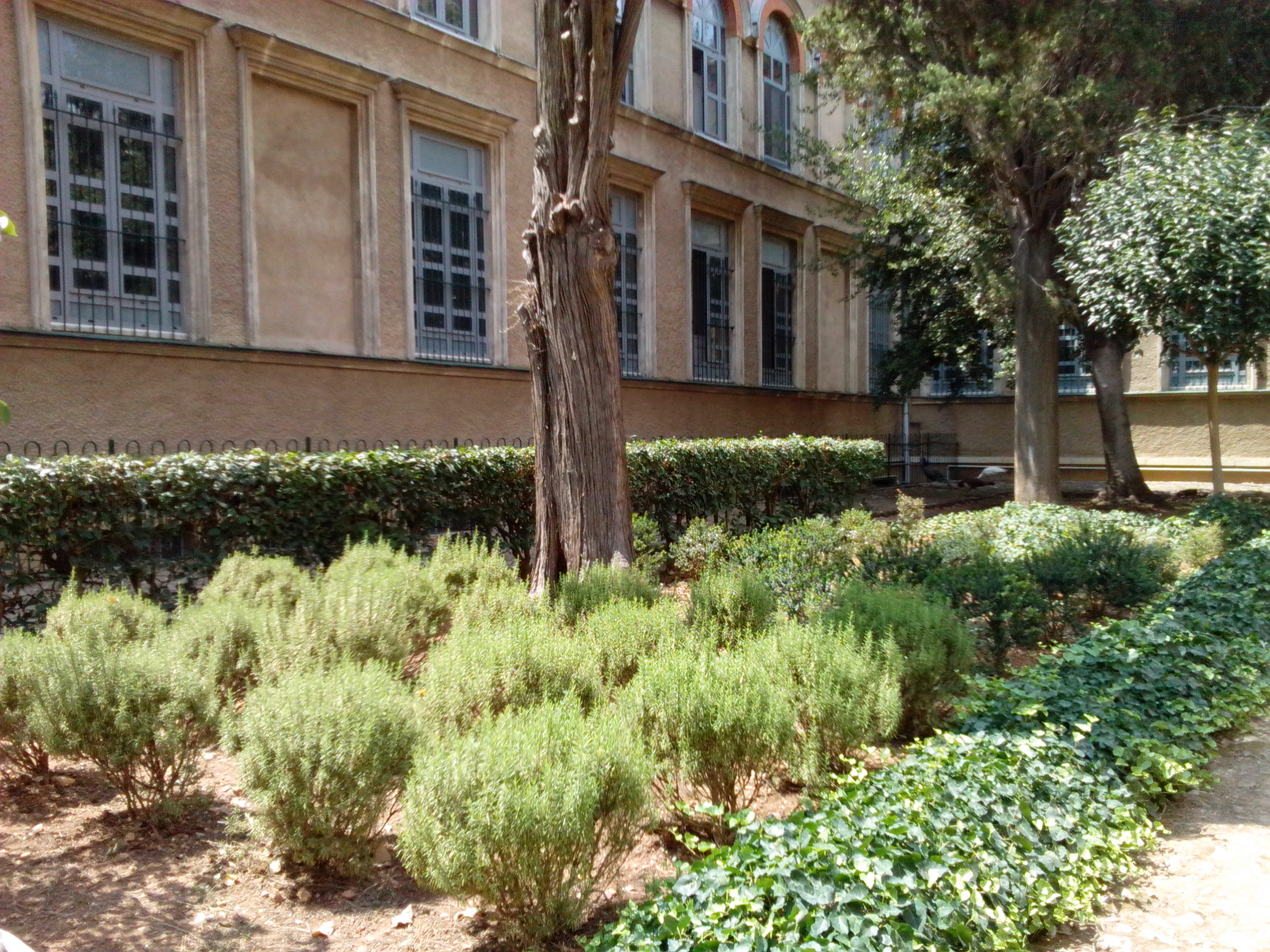
View from the Garden of Bible

In addition, in between the trees of The Trail of Virtues lies a Byzantine Meadow that consists of tulips, dandelions, cyclamens, and other plants that have a special meaning in Byzantine semantics. The creations compose a sustainable self-managed monastic garden, with strong symbolic and aesthetic interest. All needed material comes from Greek and Turkish contributions to the volunteer project.

== Thematic design ==
Visual sources, such as miniatures and religious icons, were essential for the analysis of the architectural schemes and spatial configuration. Primary material sources included thematic institutes and archives related to Byzantine gardens, the most important of which are the Hellenic Institute of Byzantine and Post-Byzantine Studies in Venice, the Byzantine Research Centre in Oxford University, and the library and archive in Dumbarton Oaks in Washington DC, which provided textual and visual sources, partly digitalized.

The tools that helped in this research were the monastic libraries (Halki Seminary, Mount Athos, Sinai Monastery), the recording of local flora (Botanical Gardens of Byzantine Empire Territories), the development of any gardens or thematic "green" sections in the existing gardens, the use of archival material from General Greek Archives, Ephorates of Byzantine Antiquities all over Greece and other sources, elements from the landscape, like monumental olive and other tree species the evolution of the vegetation and human intervention.

== See also ==
- Archbishop Elpidophoros of America
