= Petros Lapithis =

Petros Lapithis (Greek: Πέτρος Λαπίθης) is a Cypriot architect, professor, and researcher specialising in environmental design, sustainable architecture and social sustainability. He is internationally recognised noted for his contributions to architectural education, social sustainability, and participation in major exhibitions such as 18th Venice Biennale of Architecture (2023).

== Early life and education ==
Petros Lapithis was born in Nicosia, Cyprus in 1965. He holds a Higher Diploma in Mechanical Engineering from Frederick Polytechnic (1983), an M.Sc. in Architecture from University of Architecture, Civil Engineering and Geodesy (1993), and an M.Sc. in Environmental Design and Engineering from University of London (1994). He earned his Doctor of Philosophy in Solar Architecture from the University of Wales (2002). Additionally, he completed a Certificate in Education for Teachers of Architecture at The Bartlett School (1994).

== Career ==
Lapithis is a practicing architect specialising in building performance, green building and sustainable design. He is a tenured professor at the University of Nicosia and adjunct faculty at the University of Cyprus, teaching architecture, bioclimatic architecture, sustainability, and social design, and promoting an academic culture in sustainable architecture.

His research emphasizes bioclimatic architecture and passive solar design tailored to Cyprus' Mediterranean climate through design work, publications, and seminars. He has led innovative architectural projects focused on renewable energy, notably constructing the first grid-connected experimental solar house in Cyprus in 2000.

Lapithis has contributed to European Union research as Cyprus' delegate in COST Actions C16 "Improving the quality of existing urban building envelopes" (2004–2007) and C23 "Strategies for a Low Carbon Built Environment" (2006–2009), aiming to improve building envelopes and promote low-carbon urban environments in collaboration with the EU.

=== Other activities ===
Lapithis is the founder and president of the non-profit Pantheon Cultural Association, which supports upcoming Cypriot artists through activities and publications. The Association has organised the Experimental Film Festival, Experimental Sonic Arts, Urban Soul Festival.

== Recognition ==
Lapithis architectural and research work gained international attention through his core contribution to the Cyprus pavilion at the 18th Venice Biennale of Architecture (2023) with the project From Khirokitia to Mars, which examined themes of social sustainability, cultural heritage, and space exploration, gaining significant international media attention.

== Selected publications ==
- A Practical Guide to Better Research and Writing for Design Students (UNIC Press, 2011), an educational resource for design students
- Bioclimatic Architecture in Cyprus (PCA Press, 2018), a book on passive solar design for Cyprus architecture.
- Building Blocks for Social Sustainability: Nicosia, Cyprus (PCA Press, 2017), addressing urban social sustainability strategies.
- Designing a Difference: Social Sustainability in Cyprus (PCA Press, 2016 & 2nd edition 2020), exploring social sustainability within architectural practice.
- From Khirokitia to Mars (PCA Press, 2023), linking Neolithic settlement themes with space exploration, tied to Cyprus' pavilion at the Venice Biennale.
- Self Sustained Communities: From Earth to Moon to Mars (PCA Press, 2025), an exploration of self-sustained communities from Earth to Mars
