= Falcon School Cyprus =

International school in Nicosia, Cyprus

The Falcon School

Location
- 1 Nikos Ierides Street; Nicosia, 2034; Cyprus

Information
- Type: Private international school
- Established: 1976
- Founder: Nicholas M. Ierides
- Director: Irene Ierides
- Head Teacher: Maria Ehrhartsmann
- Age: 4 to 18
- Language: English
- Affiliations: International Baccalaureate (MYP)
- Website: Official website

The Falcon School is an English-medium private international school in Strovolos, Nicosia, Cyprus, providing education for pupils aged 4 to 18. The school is registered with the Ministry of Education, Sport and Youth of Cyprus on the official lists of private primary and secondary schools, and appears on the ministry’s list for private pre-primary institutions.

== History ==
Falcon School was established in 1976 by educator Nicholas M. Ierides. On 20 May 2016 the Strovolos municipal council named the street outside the campus in his honour (Nikos Ierides Street).

== Academics and accreditation ==
The school delivers an English-medium curriculum across primary and secondary levels as a registered private provider in Cyprus. In April 2025 it was authorised as an IB World School to offer the Middle Years Programme (MYP) for students aged 11–16.

== Campus ==
The campus is in Strovolos, Nicosia District, at 1 Nikos Ierides Street (postcode 2034). Local press has profiled the school and its facilities within the wider context of Cyprus’ private-school sector.

== Governance and regulation ==
Private schools in Cyprus must be registered with the Ministry of Education, which approves curricula and supervises schools; fees are subject to prior approval under national rules. In March 2025 a parliamentary committee highlighted deficiencies in the legal framework for private schools, including issues around fee increases and enforcement mechanisms.

== Incidents ==
- 2009 fire: a fire at the Strovolos campus caused extensive damage and injured two firefighters; authorities did not attribute the incident to arson.

== Reception ==
Independent press coverage of the Falcon School has largely taken the form of directory-style profiles and sector features. The Cyprus Mail Schools Guide (2021) carries an editorial profile of the school, and broader articles in the same series discuss the development of English-medium private schools in the 1970s–1980s, listing Falcon among established institutions in Nicosia.

In 2019 the Phileleftheros/In-Cyprus portal published a feature on the school outlining its programmes, facilities and extra-curricular activities.

The school describes itself as an accredited IB World School offering the Middle Years Programme.

Coverage of alumni appears occasionally in the general press; for example, Cyprus Mail reported in 2022 that educator Marina Severis had attended the Junior School and Falcon School in Nicosia before university studies in the UK.

Discussion of private-school oversight in Cyprus appears regularly in national outlets: the Eurydice network outlines the Ministry’s registration and supervision of private schools, while a 2025 parliamentary hearing reported by Philenews highlighted perceived gaps in enforcement and fee regulation affecting the sector.

== See also ==
- Education in Cyprus
- List of schools in Cyprus
