= List of schools in Cyprus =

This is a list of secondary schools in Cyprus, organized by cities. Tertiary schools are maintained at the list of universities and colleges in Cyprus.

== Nicosia ==
- American International School
- Lyceum Dasoupolis
- Falcon School
- Gymnasium Faneromenis
- Melkonian Educational Institute
- Armenian School Narek
- Pancyprian Gymnasium
- Terra Santa College
- The English School, Nicosia

== Limassol ==
- Armenian School Narek
- Laniteio Lyceum
- St. John's School
- The Heritage Private School

== Larnaka ==
- American Academy
- Armenian School Narek
- King Richard School

== Famagusta ==
- Xenion High School

== Paphos ==
- International School of Paphos

== See also ==
- Education in Cyprus
- Lists of schools
