= Niki Evelpidou =

Greek geomorphologist and academic

- Νίκη Ευελπίδου
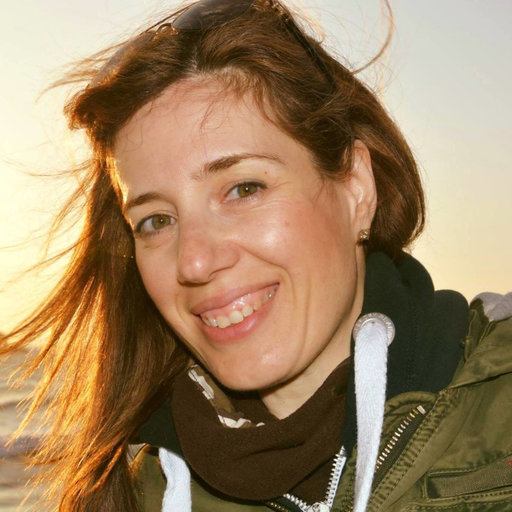
- Born: 1972 (age 53–54)
- Education: University of Athens; University of Franche-Comté
- Known for: Sea-level change, coastal geomorphology, geoarchaeology, GIS-based natural-hazard modelling
- Awards: Academy of Athens awards (2013, 2019); Member, European Academy of Sciences and Arts (2022)
- Scientific career
- Fields: Geomorphology, GIS, Geoarchaeology
- Workplaces: National and Kapodistrian University of Athens; Hellenic Open University
- Website: scholar.uoa.gr/evelpidou/home

Niki Evelpidou (Greek: Νίκη Ευελπίδου; born 1972) is a Greek geomorphologist and a professor at the Faculty of Geology and Geoenvironment of the National and Kapodistrian University of Athens (NKUA). Working at the intersection of geomorphology and geographic information systems, she is known for research on coastal geomorphology, sea-level change, palaeogeographic reconstruction, geoarchaeology, and the modelling of natural hazards under the changing climate.

== Education ==
Her academic training comprises two doctorates: one in geomorphology and GIS from the University of Athens, and a second in geoarchaeology and GIS from the University of Franche-Comté in France. Both dissertations drew on digital cartography.

== Career ==
Appointed to the National and Kapodistrian University of Athens in 2003, she holds the rank of professor. She founded the university's postgraduate programme in Geographic Information Systems and serves as its director, and she also teaches at the Hellenic Open University. Between 2018 and 2023 she was a Faculty Affiliate in the Department of Geology and Environmental Geosciences at the College of Charleston in the United States.

Beyond the university, she is Scientific Documentation Coordinator at the National Geological Museum and scientific coordinator at the Geological Museum of Apeiranthos. She has been a regional vice-president of the Coastal Education and Research Foundation (CERF) since 2017 and chaired the Greek Committee of Geomorphology and Environment from 2016 to 2018. Within Greek education she has directed the 2nd Teacher Training Centre of Athens and, from 2020 to 2024, supervised the field of Natural Sciences, Technology and Mathematics at the Institute of Educational Policy.

Alongside her academic writing, she has authored the children's science series Περιβαλλοντικές Ιστορίες (Environmental Stories), which uses stories rooted in real natural processes to introduce young readers to physical geography, the environment and geology.

== Research ==
Her research spans geomorphology, geoarchaeology, sea-level change, palaeogeography, geo-cultural heritage, geographic information systems, and the assessment of natural hazards together with strategies for adaptation and mitigation. By her own account she has produced more than 390 publications in Greek and international journals and conference proceedings, along with 32 books and university textbooks. Her work had attracted roughly 2,900 citations, for an h-index of 26, as recorded by Google Scholar in 2026. More recently her interests have turned toward nature-based solutions for coastal erosion and to assessing how wildfires alter flood and erosion hazard in Greece.

== Awards and honours ==
In 2022 she was elected a member of the European Academy of Sciences and Arts. She has twice been honoured by the Academy of Athens: in 2013 for work advancing geological knowledge of the Greek territory, and in 2019 for her monograph on sea-level change.

In 2012 the Greek State Scholarships Foundation (IKY) recognised her coordination of the Erasmus project "Runoff Erosion" (2011–2012). In 2024 her work on nature-based defences against coastal erosion won both a first prize at the innovation competition of the "Archimedes" Centre for Innovation and Entrepreneurship and a first Blue Economy award. She has also received an award for excellence in university teaching from NKUA.

She is the initiator of the International Day of Women in Geomorphology.

== Selected publications ==
- Maroukian, H.; Spyrou, E.; Tsiatoura, S.; Tzouxanioti, M.; Evelpidou, N. (2024). "Sea Level Rise and the Future of Tombolos: The Case of Greece". Journal of Marine Science and Engineering 12 (9): 1578. doi:10.3390/jmse12091578
- Evelpidou, N.; Cartalis, C.; Karkani, A.; Saitis, G.; Philippopoulos, K.; Spyrou, E. (2023). "A GIS-Based Assessment of Flood Hazard through Track Records over the 1886–2022 Period in Greece". Climate 11 (11): 226. doi:10.3390/cli11110226
- Evelpidou, N.; Ganas, A.; Karkani, A.; Spyrou, E.; Saitis, G. (2023). "Late Quaternary Relative Sea-Level Changes and Vertical GNSS Motions in the Gulf of Corinth". Geosciences 13 (11): 329. doi:10.3390/geosciences13110329
- Evelpidou, N.; et al. (2022). "Palaeo-Tsunami Events on the Coasts of Cyprus". Geosciences 12 (2): 58. doi:10.3390/geosciences12020058
- Evelpidou, N.; Karkani, A.; Kampolis, I. (2021). "Relative Sea Level Changes and Morphotectonic Implications Triggered by the Samos Earthquake of 30th October 2020". Journal of Marine Science and Engineering 9 (1): 40. doi:10.3390/jmse9010040
- Evelpidou, N.; Repapis, C.; Zerefos, C.; Tzalas, H.; Synolakis, C. (2019). Geophysical Phenomena and the Alexandrian Littoral. Oxford: Archaeopress. ISBN 9781789693089
- Evelpidou, N. (2019). "Geomorphology and Sea Level". In Finkl, C.; Makowski, C. (eds.). Encyclopedia of Coastal Science (2nd ed.). Springer. pp. 885–894. doi:10.1007/978-3-319-48657-4_396-1
- Evelpidou, N.; Pirazzoli, P.A. (2017). "Did the Early Byzantine Tectonic Paroxysm (EBTP) also affect the Adriatic area?". Geomorphology 295: 827–830. doi:10.1016/j.geomorph.2017.08.026
- Evelpidou, N.; Melini, D.; Pirazzoli, P.; Vassilopoulos, A. (2014). "Evidence of repeated late Holocene rapid subsidence in the SE Cyclades (Greece) deduced from submerged notches". International Journal of Earth Sciences 103 (1): 381–395. doi:10.1007/s00531-013-0942-0
- Evelpidou, N.; Pirazzoli, P.; Vassilopoulos, A.; Spada, G.; Ruggieri, G.; Tomasin, A. (2012). "Late Holocene Sea Level Reconstructions Based on Observations of Roman Fish Tanks, Tyrrhenian Coast of Italy". Geoarchaeology 27 (3): 259–277. doi:10.1002/gea.21387
