= Hellenic Open University =

Greek university (1992-)

Coordinates: 38°12′23″N 21°45′54″E

- Ελληνικό Ανοικτό Πανεπιστήμιο (ΕΑΠ)
- Motto: Access to Knowledge for Everyone!
- Type: Public higher education institution
- Established: 1992; 34 years ago
- Rector: Manolis Koutouzis
- Faculty: 1,995
- Administrative staff: 202
- Students: 37.563
- Undergraduates: 19.054
- Postgraduates: 18.509
- Doctoral students: 90
- Location: Patras, Greece
- Campus: 11.750,88 m^{2}
- Colors: Pink and blue
- Nickname: EAP (ΕΑΠ)
- Website: www.eap.gr

The Hellenic Open University (HOU; Greek: Ελληνικό Ανοικτό Πανεπιστήμιο, ΕΑΠ) was founded in 1992 in Patras and is the only online/distance-learning public university in Greece. Modelled on the British Open University, the Hellenic Open University was established to fill a gap for telematic and distance education in the higher education system of the Hellenic Republic in response to the growing demand for continuing education and lifelong learning.

It is the first and only higher education institution (HEI) in Greece that provides open and distance education at undergraduate and postgraduate as well as doctoral level. Placing great emphasis on research, HOU promotes research programmes aiming towards the development of methodologies and corresponding high technologies for open and distance learning.

== History ==
The Hellenic Open University was founded in 1992 in Patras, but remained defunct until 1997 at which time legislation was enacted with the Law 2552/23-12-1997 (Government Gazette A' 266/24-12-1997) regarding its operation. The first cohorts of students were admitted in 1999. Further legislation amended the operation of the university by further specifying inter alia its scope, admissions, tuition and academic recruitment procedures (Article 14 of Act 2817/2000, Article 3 of Act 3027/2002 and Article 13 of Act 3260/2004). The 1st Panhellenic Conference on Open and Distance Learning was held on 20-22 June 2001.

== Academic profile ==
=== Structure ===
Hellenic Open University (HOU) is organised in 4 schools which organize 9 Undergraduate Programmes:

Schools	Undergraduate Programmes
School of Humanities (est. in 1997)	European Studies: History, Society and Civilisation (EPO) (est. in 1997); Studies in Greek Civilization (ELP) (est. in 2000); Hispanic Language and Civilization Studies (ISP) (est. in 2001)
School of Social Sciences (est. in 1997)	Business Administration (DEO) (est. in 2000); Public Administration (DHD) (est. in 2018); Tourism Management (DIT) (est. in 2018)
School of Science and Technology (est. in 1997)	Studies in Natural Sciences (FYE) (est. in 2000); Computer Science (PLI) (est. in 1998)
School of Applied arts and Sustainable Design (est. in 1997)	Film Studies: Screenplay, Filmmaking, and Research (SKI) (est. in 2023)

According to Law 2552/1997, HOU consists of the Educational Material and Methodology Laboratory (EEYEM) established and operating as an independent unit of the HOU.

==== Postgraduate programs ====
Postgraduate degrees are also offered in various subjects such as LL.M. European Law, Master in Education, MSc in Applied Developmental Psychology, Adult education, Teaching English as a Foreign Language, Teaching German as a Foreign Language, Teaching French as a Foreign Language, MSc in Quality Assurance, Public History, Language Education for Refugees and Migrants, Environmental Design of Cities and Buildings, Environmental Design of Infrastructure, Tourist Business Administration, Health Care Administration, Health National System Services Administration, Banking, Orthodox Theology, Graphic Arts - Multimedia, Waste Management, Construction Management, earthquake engineering and Seismic Resistant Structures, Advanced Studies in Physics, Catalysis and Environmental Protection, MSc in Mathematics, MSc in Information Systems, MSc in Natural Sciences for Educators, Administration of Cultural Units, Master in Business Administration and MSc in Engineering of Pervasive Computing Systems. The university offers a postgraduate degree, 'Cultural Organisations' Management, M.Sc., School of Social Sciences.

The university offers joint postgraduate degrees in co-operation with the University of Nicosia, the Open University of Cyprus, and Frederick University.

==== Research ====
Research is conducted in all four schools of the Hellenic Open University by faculty members and is supported by postdoctoral researchers and doctoral students.

- School of Humanities: National Conference on Open and Distance Education.
- School of Social Sciences.
- School of Science and Technology: Research is conducted in various fields of Science and Engineering (Physics Laboratory, Biology Laboratory, Chemistry Laboratory, Digital Systems and Media Computing Laboratory, Software Quality Research Laboratory, Converged Networks and Services Research Group (CONES), HELYCON Distributed Cosmic Rays Telescope).
- School of Applied Arts.

The HOU has built a network of co-operation with other academic and research institutes: Open University of Cyprus, Harokopio University, Panteion University, University of Western Macedonia, University of Thessaly, European University Cyprus, University of Nicosia, Vrije Universiteit Brussel and the National Hellenic Research Foundation.

=== Students ===
In 2017, it was estimated that around 47,000 students were registered in the HOU.

Older data suggests that the majority of them are mature students, over 35 years old. Admissions take place randomly through a strict and predefined algorithm evaluated and assured by the district attorney and nearly one out of ten applicants is granted a place at the university.

Attrition levels are high: for instance, out of more than 500 students who registered in the Natural Sciences program in 2000, only 8 had graduated by the end of 2006. The high attrition rate has been attributed to a combination of the demands posed by the students' non-academic commitments and inappropriate teaching provision, such as, possibly, the inability to create uniformly successful electronic fora for student collaboration. A university culture that is reluctant to use ICT, and embraces distance-learning (rather than e-learning) as a preferred teaching methodology is also cited as an example of practices that depress learning outcomes.

=== Teaching staff ===
The University offers its courses through 1.358 professors most of which teach relevant courses in Greece's public universities. In addition to their teaching role, the staff of the university produce research which primarily focuses on issues of distance education, according to the university mandate. In terms of research output, the tenured academics of the university published 188 articles between 2002 and 2006 in peer-reviewed journals, including the ones affiliated to the university. Including self-references, these articles had generated 233 citations as recorded on the ISI Web of Knowledge.

== Academic evaluation ==
In 2016 the external evaluation committee gave the Hellenic Open University a Positive evaluation.

An external evaluation of all academic departments in Greek universities was conducted by the Hellenic Authority for Higher Education (HAHE).

- School of Humanities (February 2014).
- School of Social Sciences (December 2013).
- School of Science and Engineering (October 2013).
- School of Applied arts (February 2014).

Formal self-evaluations and external reviews, which are mandated by legislation for all public tertiary institutes, have been taking place in the HOU.

== Awards and reputation ==
All universities providing distance study, have faced controversy concerning the level and quality of their studies – a stage, incidentally, that the open universities operating in other countries also passed in their first stages. Due to the above, HOU is viewed with skepticism by Greece's academic community, despite its legal recognition, awards, acceptance and reputation. However, such concerns are unwarranted. Not only does research show that DE offers certain students a sound pedagogical alternative, HOU's tutors and academic community are also members of Greece's traditional university community. Moreover, the course writers hired by HOU to write its course and learning materials also work as course writers at traditional universities.

The MBA program offered by the institution was awarded an E-xcellence Associate in Quality by the European Association of Distance Teaching Universities (EADTU) and it is now included in the list of the Qualified institutions. In addition to the above the HOU's School of Arts was awarded an Excellence by the National Ministry of Education for its Pervasive Computing Games.

== See also ==
- Open University
- List of universities in Greece
