= University of Limassol =

Coordinates: 34.6817°N 33.0295°E

- Πανεπιστήμιο Λεμεσού
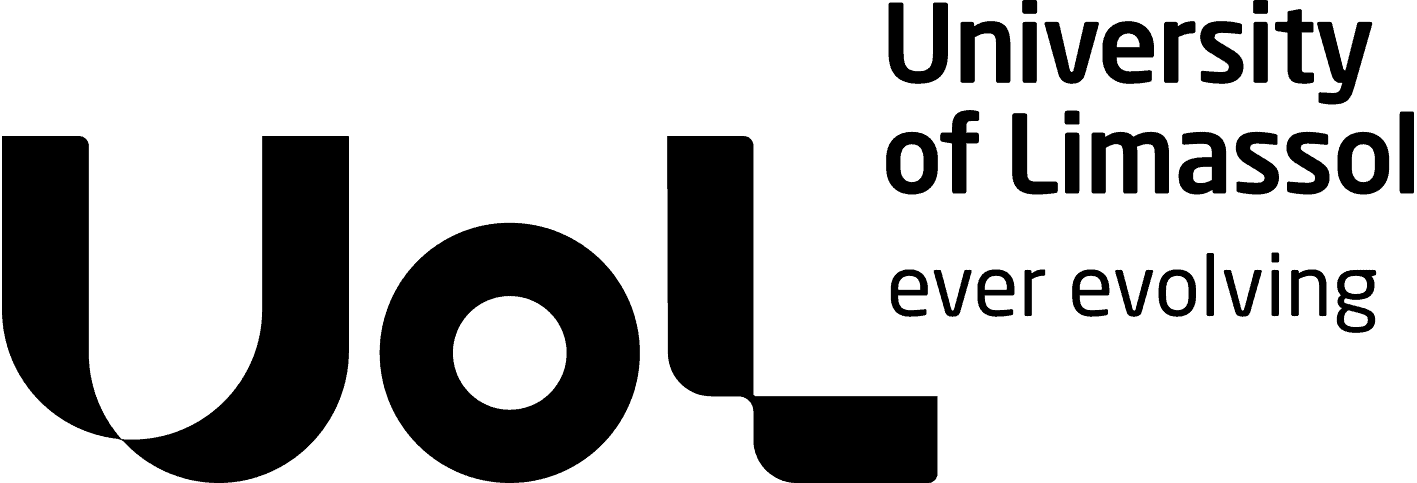
- Type: Private University
- Established: 1990 (as CIIM); 2023 (University status)
- Affiliations: EFMD, AACSB
- Chairman: John Joannides
- Rector: Theodore Panayotou
- Students: 2,500+
- Location: Limassol, Cyprus
- Campus: Urban (Limassol and Nicosia)
- Website: www.uol.ac.cy

University of Limassol (UoL) is a private university in Cyprus, with campuses located in Limassol and Nicosia. The institution is the successor to the Cyprus International Institute of Management (CIIM), which operated as a postgraduate business school from 1990 until 2023. The university officially commenced operations on 1 September 2023, following an evaluation and licensing by the Cyprus Agency of Quality Assurance and Accreditation in Higher Education (CYQAA). The transition involved a restructuring of the academic framework to include undergraduate programs and a broader range of disciplines beyond management, such as technology, economics, and social sciences.

== History ==
The institution was founded in 1990 as CIIM by a group of academics and business executives. Early founders included John Joannides, former General Manager of the Cyprus Development Bank, and Costas Constantinides, former chairman of the Electricity Authority of Cyprus. For approximately 33 years, the institute functioned as a specialized school for postgraduate management studies. During this period, it became a member of the European Foundation for Management Development (EFMD) and the Association to Advance Collegiate Schools of Business (AACSB).

In 2022, the owner of the institute, CIIM Innovations Ltd, applied to national authorities for a transition to university status. This application was based on the institution's existing graduate programs and a planned expansion into computer science, technology, and economics. The Cyprus Cabinet approved the upgrade in early 2023, and the institution was renamed the University of Limassol. The university began its first academic year in late 2023, introducing undergraduate degrees alongside its established master's programs. In 2025, the university received ISO certifications for quality (9001), environmental (14001), and occupational health and safety (45001) management systems. The university is currently developing a new campus in Palodia, Limassol, which is intended to serve as its primary headquarters upon completion.

== Academic Profile ==
The University of Limassol is organized into three constituent schools. The CIIM Business School manages the Department of Management and the Department of Economics and Finance, offering the Master of Business Administration (MBA) and specialized MSc programs in Financial Services and Human Resource Management. The Technology and Innovation School focuses on fields such as information technology, business intelligence, and data analytics. The Social Sciences and Humanities School includes departments for psychology, education, and law.

The university employs various teaching methods, including team exercises, case studies, and simulation games. Academic programs are designed to meet the ECTS (European Credit Transfer and Accumulation System) standards. Besides degree-granting programs, the university provides vocational and professional development courses in subjects such as programming and professional English.

== Accreditation ==
The university is recognized by the Ministry of Education, Sport and Youth of Cyprus and is accredited by the CYQAA. Its MBA program holds international accreditation from the EFMD Global organization. In 2018, while operating as CIIM, the institution was noted by the U-Multirank system for its performance in income generated from continuous professional development. The university is a member of the Erasmus+ program and provides a Diploma Supplement to graduates in accordance with European Commission models.

== See also ==
- Education in Cyprus
- List of universities and colleges in Cyprus
