= Byzantine gardens =

Gardens popular during the Byzantine Empire

The ancient city of Byzantium occupies an important place in the history of garden design between eras and cultures (c. 4th century – 10th century CE). The city was renamed Constantinople (present day Istanbul) in 330 AD and became the capital of the Byzantine Empire and survived for a thousand years after the fall of the Western Roman Empire. The gardens of Byzantium were, however, mostly destroyed after the 15th-century Turkish conquest of the city.

== Design ==
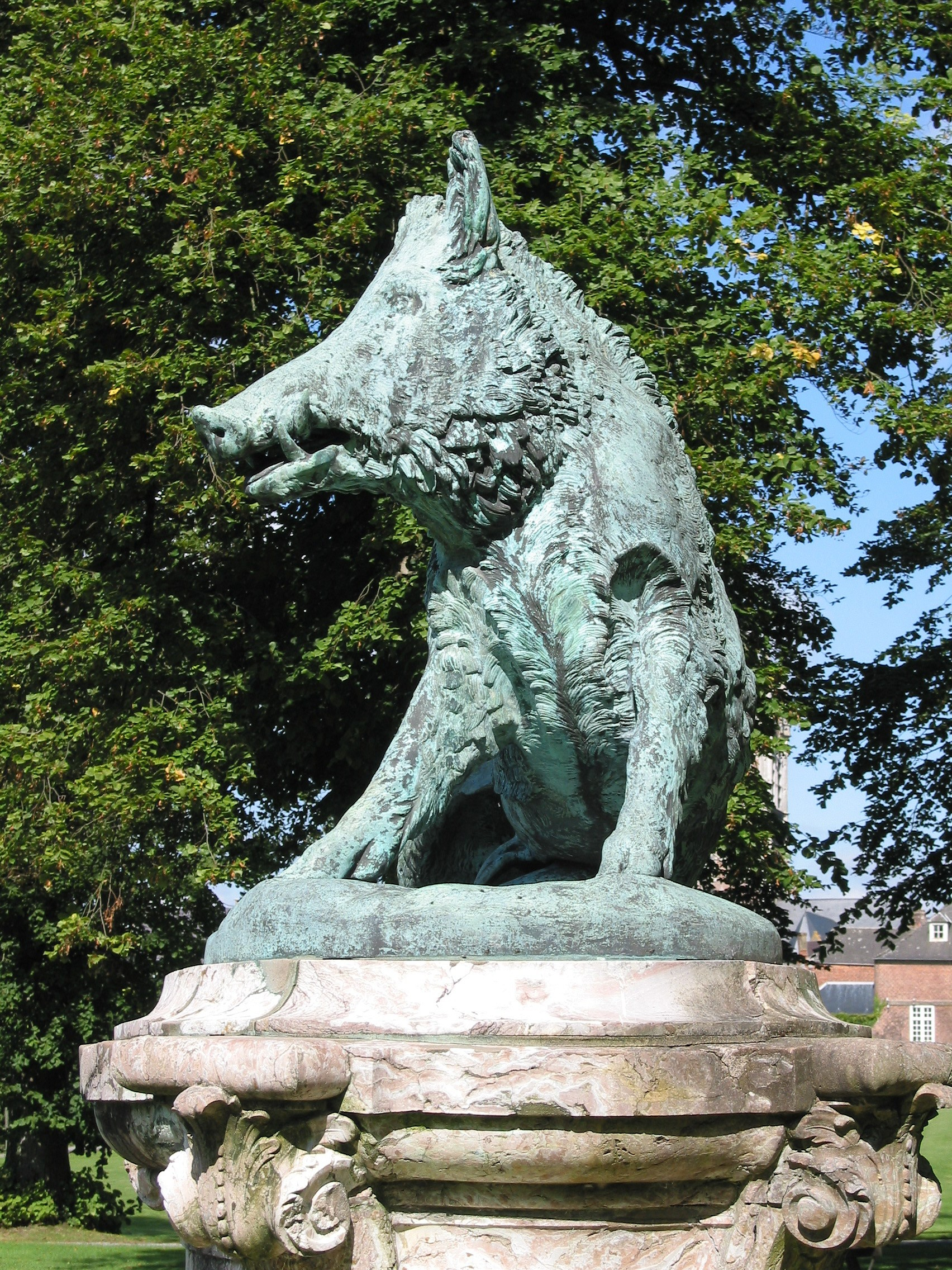
A modern bronze copy of a Greek garden statue, the type of which survived well into Late antiquity.

Byzantine gardens were based largely on Roman ideas emphasizing elaborate Hellenistic mosaic designs, a typical classical feature of formally arrayed trees and built elements such as fountains and small shrines. These gradually grew to become more elaborate as time passed. Byzantine gardens have influenced Islamic gardens and particularly Moorish gardens; the latter being because Spain was for centuries a Roman province (and, during the reign of Justinian the Great, a Byzantine province as well).

== Study ==
Little else is known about Eastern Roman gardens and very few references, let alone entire treatises, exist on the subject. The Eastern Romans, like their Greco-Roman predecessors, attached great importance to matters of aesthetics. However, ancient Greek and Roman gardens were more developed and better documented.

== Later Greek rule ==
During the last 250 years of Greek rule ending in 1453, conditions drastically curtailed the tradition, which stretched back to Hellenistic times, of building luxurious villas, mostly outside the cities, with pleasing gardens, as appear in mosaics and frescoes or are recorded in texts. This period seems to have been less thoroughly investigated than have most earlier periods, and a concentration on it should produce a more coherent picture than another attempt to cover the whole span of Byzantine history.

== See also ==
- Generalife
- Spanish garden
