= Xenion High School =

Cypriot high school

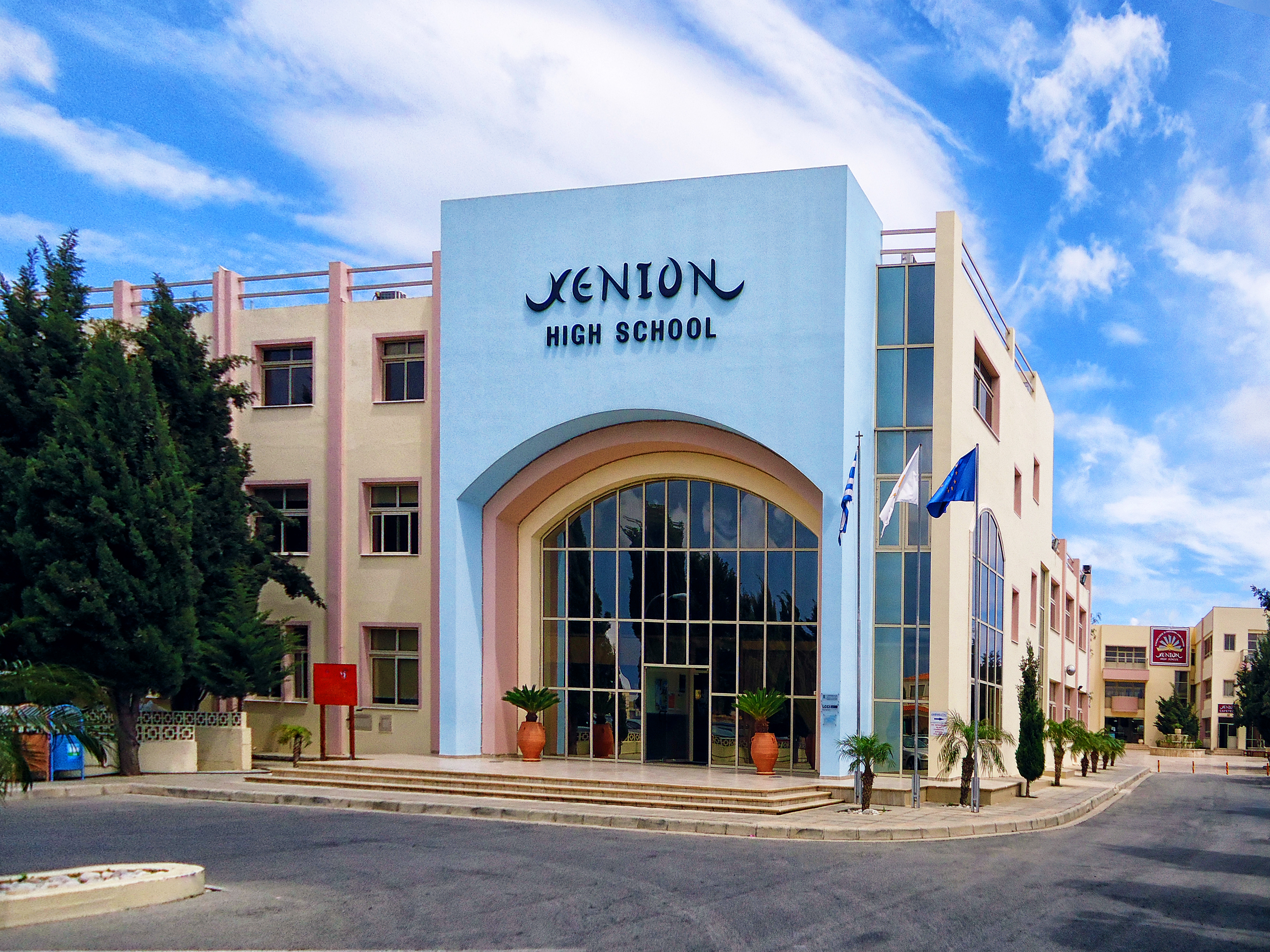

Location
- Paralimni, Cyprus
- Coordinates: 35.04146°N 33.97837°E

Information
- Type: Private
- Motto: Knowledge is freedom and power
- Established: 2001
- School district: Famagusta
- Principal: Katelitsa Zouvani Phylactou
- Staff: ~120
- Campus size: ~500
- Colors: Maroon, blue
- Website: www.xenion.ac.cy

Xenion High School is a high school in Paralimni, Cyprus. It was established in 2001 and functions under the supervision of the Ministry of Education and Culture in accordance with the Private Schools Act, 1971. The school is similar to state schools. It is the only private school in the Famagusta area.

Xenion students achieve the best results in Cyprus across all private schools. They have also achieved several world firsts. In November 2011, the British Council named Xenion High School students the "Best Performing Learners in Cyprus" in the June 2011 examination series.
