= Open University of Cyprus =

Distance education university in Cyprus

Coordinates: 35.1131°N 33.3774°E

- Ανοικτό Πανεπιστήμιο Κύπρου
- Type: Public
- Established: 2002
- President: Mr. George Papas
- Rector: Prof. Petros Pashiardis (Rector)
- Students: 3,000 (2022-2023 academic year)
- Location: Nicosia, Cyprus
- Website: http://www.ouc.ac.cy

The Open University of Cyprus (OUC; Greek: Ανοικτό Πανεπιστήμιο Κύπρου), in Lefkosia (Nicosia), is a public university in Cyprus, specialized in open and distance education. OUC evolved in response to the growing demand for continuing education and lifelong learning. It is the first and only Higher Education Institution (HEI) in Cyprus that is fully dedicated to open and distance education at both undergraduate and postgraduate level. Placing great emphasis on research, the OUC promotes research programmes aiming towards the development of methodologies and corresponding high technologies for open and distance learning.

== Methodology ==
The Open University of Cyprus style of teaching is called "open and distance learning". More specifically, students have the opportunity to learn in their own time without having to be present at the premises of the university to be able to attend lectures, seminars or labs, as it is the case with conventional universities.

The Open University's degree structure and credit system is based on the concept of Thematic Units (or Modules) adaptable to the European Credit Transfer and Accumulation System (ECTS). OUC students have access to an e-learning platform, an electronic portal where practical information concerning studies at the Open University and related regulations and procedures are posted, as well as information regarding Study Courses, course materials and student workload.

== Programmes of study ==
The full course catalogue for the 2023-2024 academic year includes the following programmes:

At the postgraduate level, programmes offered in English:

- Master of Business Administration (The Open MBA)
- Cognitive Systems (joint degree with University of Cyprus)
- Enterprise Risk Management (joint degree with Hellenic Open University)
- Adult Education for Social Change (joint degree with University of Glasgow, Tallinn University, University of Malta and Maynooth University)

At the undergraduate level, programmes offered in Greek:

- Business Administration
- Police Studies (only for graduates of the Cyprus Police Academy)
- Studies in Hellenic Culture
- Economics
- Law

At the postgraduate level, programmes offered in Greek:

- Applied Health Informatics and Telemedicine
- Banking and Finance
- Communications and Journalism
- Continuing Education and Lifelong Learning
- Cultural Policy and Development
- Educational Studies
- Environment Conservation and Management
- European Union Law
- Greek Linguistics and Literature
- Healthcare Management
- Management, Technology and Quality
- Business Administration (The Open MBA)
- Theater Studies
- Computer and Network Security
- Media in Contemporary Schools
- PNYX: Political History, Theory and Practice
- Bioethics- Medical Ethics

=== Cooperating universities ===
- Hellenic Open University since 1 March 2013
