= Cyprus West University =

University in Northern Cyprus

- Kıbrıs Batı Üniversitesi
- Former names: High Science Educations
- Motto: Gain the competence
- Type: Private non-profit
- Established: 2015
- Parent institution: Dünya, Bilim, Eğitim, Sağlık, Sanat, Tarım ve Turizm (DBEST) Vakfı
- Rector: Prof. Dr. Canan HECER
- Students: 2000
- Location: İsmet İnönü Boulevard No:29, Famagusta (Turkish: Gazimağusa), 99450, Northern Cyprus; 35.1242°N 33.9342°E
- Campus: Urban
- Language: English, Turkish
- Colours: Blue Zodiac and Eastern Blue
- Website: www.cwu.edu.tr

Cyprus West University (CWU; Turkish: Kıbrıs Batı Üniversitesi, commonly referred to as KIBÜ) is a non-profit university located in Famagusta, Northern Cyprus, and was established in 2015. Cyprus West University has five faculties, three schools, and 20 different undergraduate and associate programs are offered in English and Turkish Languages. Cyprus West University is accredited by YÖK, Turkish Republic Higher Education Board and YÖDAK, The Higher Education Planning, Evaluation, Accreditation and coordination Council of Northern Cyprus, and approved by TRNC Ministry of National Education and Culture.

== Campus ==
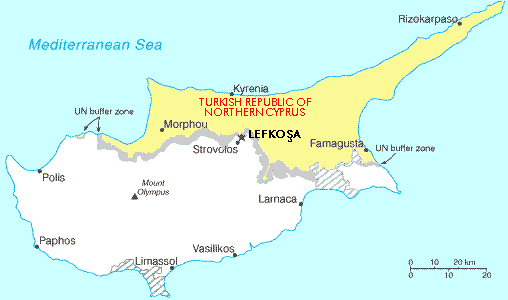
North Cyprus

Cyprus West University was founded on 8 December 2015 in Famagusta city center and includes education building, dormitory, sports fields and all kinds of social cultural structures. New campus project is under construction and it is planned to be completed in a short time.

The campus consists of Open and closed cafeterias, Basketball Field, Volleyball Field, Table Tennis Field, Parking Area, Student Dormitory, Conference hall, Computer lab, Library, Prayer Room, Infirmary, Classrooms, and Medical Laboratory.

== Faculties and schools ==
- Institute of Social Science
- Faculty of Economics, Administrative, and Social Sciences
- Faculty of Engineering
- Faculty of Health Sciences
- Faculty of Law
- Faculty of Education
- School of Justice
- School of Health
- English Preparatory School

== Master programs ==
- Master of Business Administration (MBA)

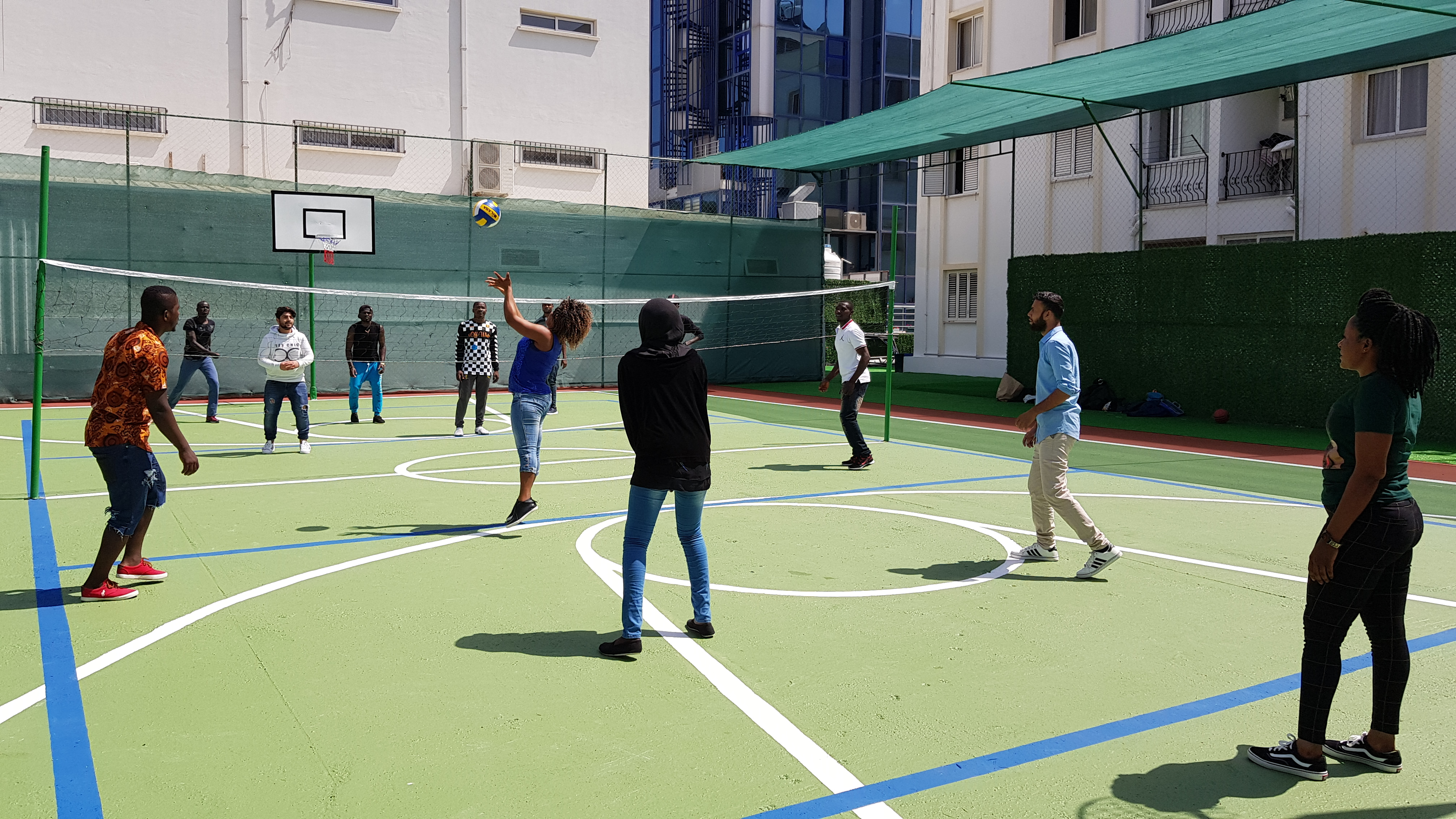
Sport Fields

== Undergraduate programs ==
- Electrical and Electronics Engineering
- Computer Engineering
- Information System Engineering
- Software Engineering
- Business Administration
- Tourism and Hotel Management
- Civil Aviation Management
- Psychology
- Logistics
- Law
- International Law
- Nutrition and Dietetics
- Guidance and Psychological Counseling

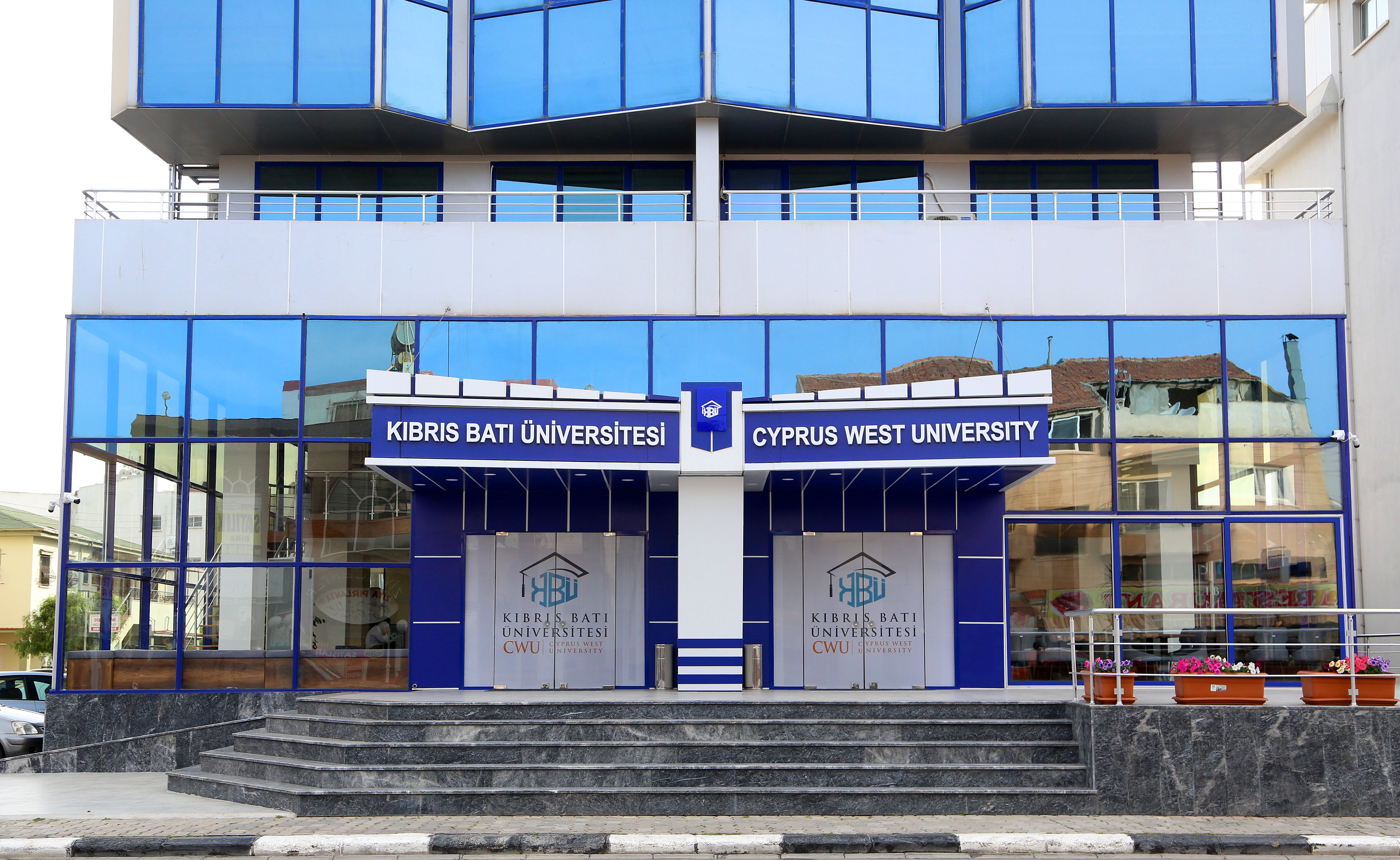

== Associate programs ==
- Justice
- Pharmaceutics
- First Aid and Emergency Aid
- Anesthesia
- Operating Room Services

== Schools ==
- Foundation English School (FES)

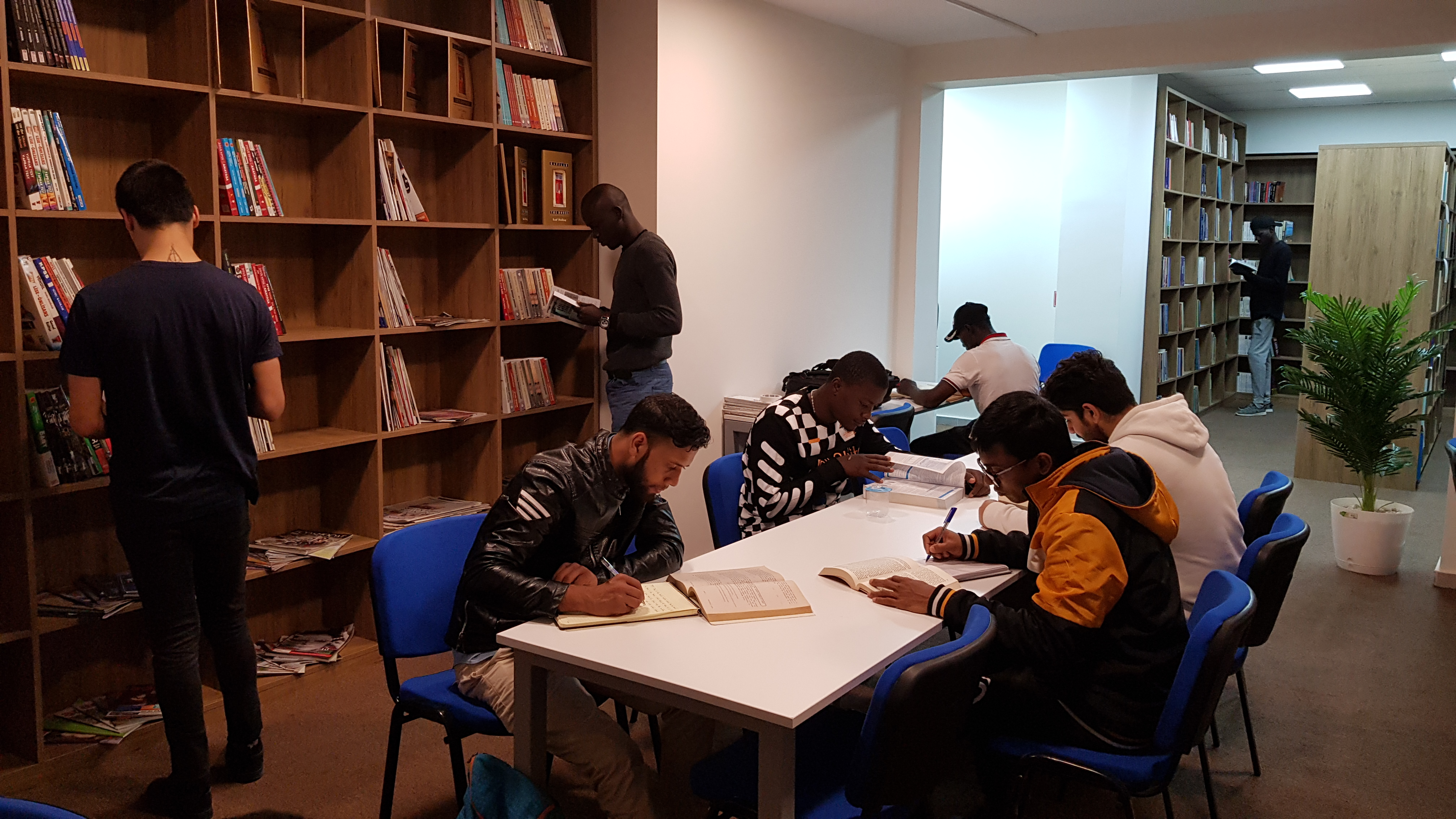
Eyyüp Cenap Gülpınar Library
