= Neapolis University Paphos =

Private university in Paphos, Cyprus

- Πανεπιστήμιο Νεάπολις Πάφου
- Type: Private
- Established: 2007
- President: George Leptos
- Rector: Prof. Pantelis Sklias
- Location: Paphos, Cyprus
- Campus: Paphos
- Website: www.nup.ac.cy

The Neapolis University Pafos (NUP) is a private university in Paphos, Cyprus, that offers graduate and undergraduate degrees in Economic and Business Studies, Law, Health Sciences, Architecture & Land and Environmental Sciences, Theology and Greek Civilisation.

== History ==
In October 2007 the university was listed in the Register of Universities of the Ministry of Education following a decision of the Cabinet. Michael Leptos, founder of Leptos Estates, serves as President. In June 2010 the university took the initial license of operation. The decision was made after a positive recommendation of E.A.I.P. On the basis of the successful response of the provisions of the law, the final authorization will be granted to the university. All programs of the university are fully recognised by the Republic of Cyprus and all EU countries.

After thorough evaluation, the National Academic Recognition and Information Centre (NASIR) of Greece recognised Neapolis University Pafos as equivalent to a Greek University in July 2012.

== Evaluation and recognition ==
The Neapolis University of Pafos operates under the relevant law of private universities in Cyprus. Study programs are evaluated and approved by a special committee, the Evaluation Committee of Private Universities (E.A.I.P., www.ecpu.ac.cy). This committee has the overall supervision of the operation of the university.

In October 2007 the university was registered in the Register of Universities of the Ministry of Education following a decision of the Cabinet. In June 2010 the university took the initial license of operation and 2015 the Final Licence of operation. The decision was made after a positive recommendation of E.A.I.P. On the basis of the successful response of the provisions of the law, the final authorization granted to the university in January 2015.

All programs of the university are fully recognized by the Republic of Cyprus and all EU countries.

After thorough evaluation, the National Academic Recognition and Information Centre (NASIR) of Greece recognized Neapolis University of Pafos as equivalent to a Greek University in July 2012.

The programs in architecture and real estate are also recognized by the Professional and Technical Chamber of Cyprus (ETEK). Moreover, the postgraduate programme of the Real Estate is accredited by the Royal Institution of Chartered Surveyors (RICS).

Similar recognitions exist for other courses related to professional bodies.

== Facilities ==
The University Campus has classrooms and amphitheatres, teaching, research and computer labs, architectural studios, a main library, student dormitories. Students and staff have access to facilities such as indoor and outdoor hotel-standard restaurant/cafeteria, outdoor swimming pool and snack pool bar, health centre with indoor swimming pool and gym, floodlit tennis courts, car park and 24-hour security service. The university is located in the western coastal Kato Paphos area, adjacent to the beltway and major coastal highway, which makes private and public transportation easy and fast. In addition, students and staff can benefit from the various amenities of the immediate areas surrounding the Campus.
