= University of Nicosia =

Private university in Nicosia, Cyprus

- Πανεπιστήμιο Λευκωσίας (Greek)
- Motto: Think Big
- Type: Private, for profit
- Established: 1980
- Rector: Philipos Pouyioutas
- Location: Nicosia, Cyprus
- Campus: Nicosia, Limassol, Larnaca
- Website: unic.ac.cy

The University of Nicosia (UNIC) is a private for-profit university in Nicosia, Cyprus.

In September 2007, Intercollege became the University of Nicosia, Cyprus. It later split from the rest of the University of Nicosia.

The University of Nicosia operates a branch campus in Athens, Greece, known as UNIC Athens.

Through scholarship, students were given the opportunity to continue their education at this institution with financial support.

The university houses the largest medical school in the country and offers multiple medical programmes: 1) A 6-year undergraduate entry Doctor of Medicine (GEMD) programme; 2) a 5-year Graduate Entry Medical Degree (GEMD); 3) a master's degree in Family Medicine (MScFM); 4) a master's degree in Public Health (MPH) and 5) a PhD in medical sciences.

== Campuses ==
Nicosia Campus

The main campus of the University of Nicosia is located in Engomi, Nicosia. It includes lecture halls, auditoriums, laboratories, a library, and student residences. The campus houses, among others, the Medical School and the Architecture Research Centre (ARC), which accommodates the Department of Architecture.

Athens Campus

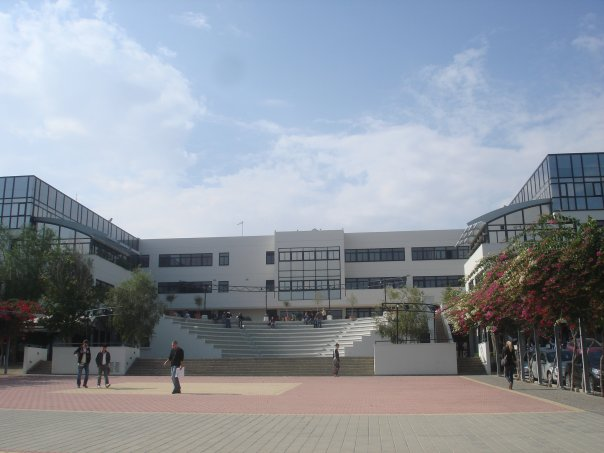
University of Nicosia's view of Amphitheatre

The University of Nicosia operates a campus in Athens, located in the Elliniko area, known as the UNIC Athens Campus. The campus operates as a branch of the University of Nicosia and has been licensed by the Greek Ministry of Education, Religious Affairs and Sports. The branch began operations in the 2025–2026 academic year. It comprises facilities with a total area of approximately 12,500 m², including classrooms, research laboratories, and student residences.

== History ==
The University of Nicosia was granted university status in 2007, having developed from Intercollege, which was founded in 1980.

In 2011, the University of Nicosia Medical School was established in collaboration with St George’s, University of London.
