= Frederick University =

University in Cyprus

Coordinates: 35.1794°N 33.3804°E

- Πανεπιστήμιο Frederick
- Former names: Nicosia Technical & Economics School
- Type: Private
- Established: 1965 / 2007
- Location: Nicosia and Limassol, Cyprus
- Campus: Blended
- Colours: Blue/White
- Website: www.frederick.ac.cy

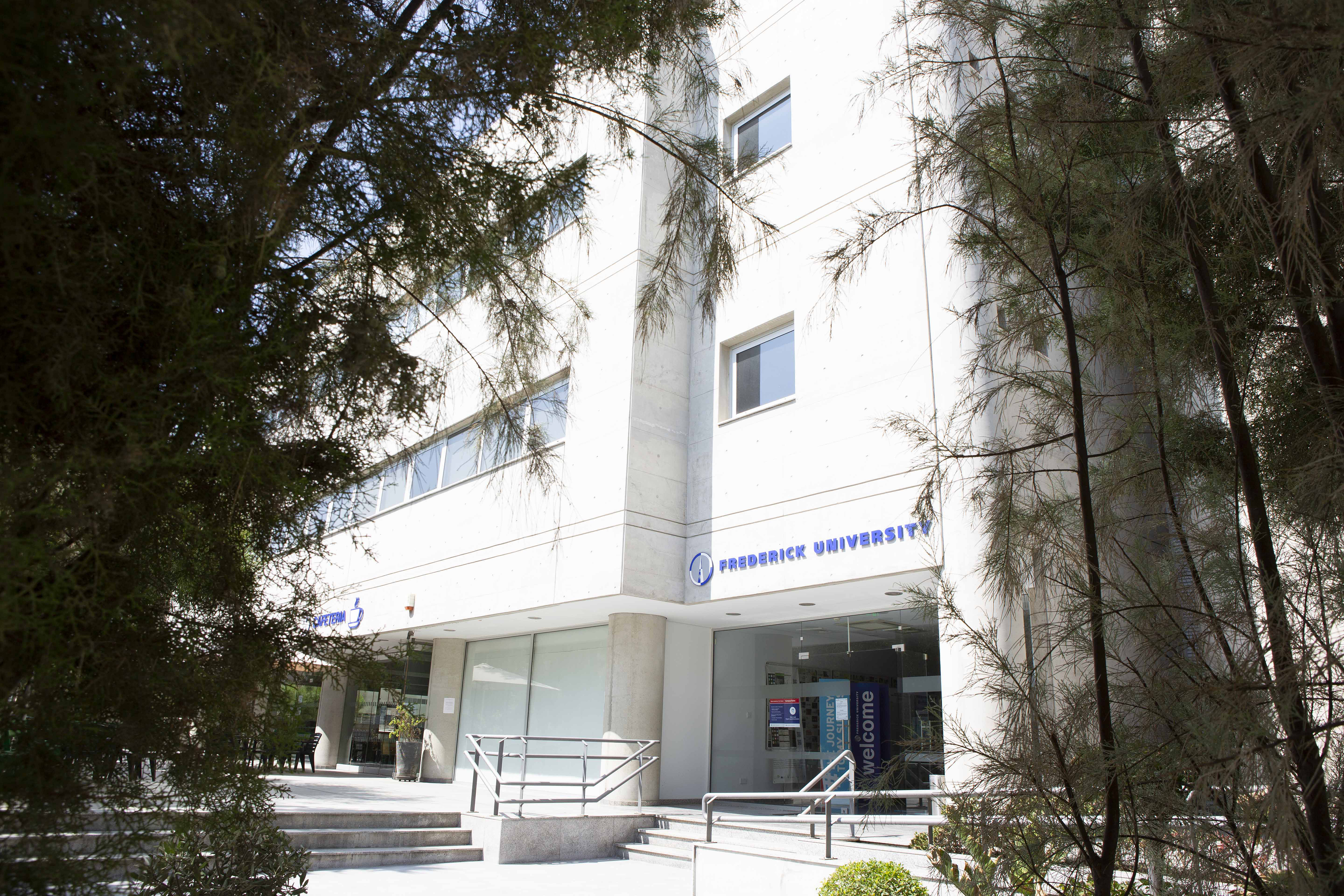

Frederick University is a private university in the Republic of Cyprus. It offers undergraduate and graduate programs on two campuses, one in the capital of the island Nicosia and the other in the second largest city, Limassol.

Frederick University offers teaching and research in the fields of science, technology, letters and the arts.

== History ==
Although Frederick University was formally established as a university in 2007, it has a long history in higher education. The organization was first established in 1965 as the Nicosia Technical and Economics School and has since 1975 offered higher education programs as Frederick Institute of Technology (FIT). It offered a broad range of diploma, degree and master courses in the areas of science, engineering, business, tourism, arts, media and education. As a college of higher education, it had established collaborations with a number of UK universities (Bristol, Sunderland University) to jointly offer two-year diploma and Master programs.

With the Cyprus law for private universities coming into effect in 2005, FIT applied to establish Frederick University, becoming one of the first private universities in Cyprus in September 2007.

== Schools and programs ==
The university operates five schools and more than 80 programs. It also operates a number of technical programs under the Frederick Institute of Technology (FIT).

=== Undergraduate programs ===
- School of Arts, Communication and Cultural Studies
1. BA in Visual Communication
2. BA in Interior Design
3. BA in Fashion and Image Design
4. BA in Journalism
- School of Business and Law
1. BA in Business Administration
2. BSc in Accounting and Finance
3. BSc in Maritime Studies
4. Bachelor of Laws (LLB)
- School of Education and Social Sciences
1. BEd in Primary Education
2. BEd in Pre-Primary Education
3. BSc in Physical Education and Sport Sciences
4. BSc in Psychology
5. BA in Social Work
- School of Engineering
1. Diploma in Architectural Engineering (Integrated Master)
2. BSc in Civil Engineering
3. BSc in Electrical Engineering
4. BSc in Computer Science
5. BSc in Computer Engineering
6. BSc in Mechanical Engineering
7. BSc in Automotive Engineering
- School of Health Sciences
1. BSc in Pharmacy
2. BSc in General Nursing

=== Postgraduate and doctoral programs ===
- School of Arts, Communication and Cultural Studies
1. MA in Visual Arts
2. PhD in Art and Design Practices
- School of Business and Law
1. Master of Business Administration (MBA)
2. Master of Business Administration (MBA) with specialization in Public Policy and Management
3. MSc in International Trade and Shipping Management
4. MSc in Marine Engineering and Management
5. MSc in Health Management
6. MA / LLM in Maritime Law and Shipping Management
7. LLM in Public Law
8. PhD in Law
9. PhD in Management
- School of Education and Social Sciences
1. MA in Adult Education
2. MA in Special Education
3. MA in Educational Administration and Leadership
4. MA in Social Work and Social Administration
5. MEd in Educational Studies: Curriculum Development and Instruction
6. MSc in Education for Sustainable Development and Social Change
7. PhD in Education
8. PhD in Social Work, Social Policy and Administration
- School of Engineering
1. MSc in Conservation and Restoration of Historical Structures and Monuments
2. MSc in Electrical Engineering
3. MSc in Manufacturing Engineering Design
4. MSc in Energy Engineering
5. MSc in Structural Engineering
6. MSc in Web and Smart Systems
7. PhD in Electrical Engineering
8. PhD in Mechanical Engineering
9. PhD in Civil Engineering
10. PhD in Computer Science
11. PhD in Computer Engineering
- School of Health Sciences
1. MSc in Community Healthcare
2. MSc in Health Management
3. PhD in Health Management
