= Motides =

Motides: Μότιδες (Greek); İncesu (Turkish)
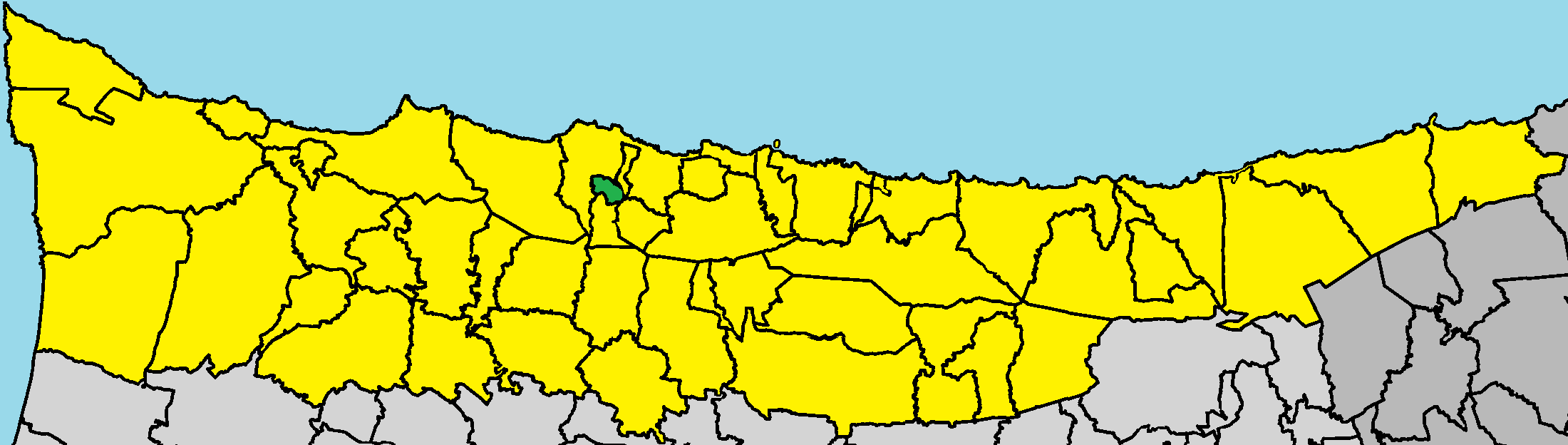
- Motides in Kyrenia District

- Location in Cyprus
- Coordinates: 35°20′7″N 33°12′26″E
- Country (de jure): Cyprus
  - District: Kyrenia District
- Country (de facto): Northern Cyprus
  - District: Girne District

Population (2011)
  - Total: 180
- Along with Palaiosofos
- Time zone: UTC+2 (EET)
  - Summer (DST): UTC+3 (EEST)

Motides (Greek: Μότιδες; Turkish: İncesu) is a small village in Cyprus, to the east of Lapithos. De facto, it is under the control of Northern Cyprus.

According to the Statistics Office of Northern Cyprus, in 2011 there were 180 inhabitants in the village.
