= Palaiosofos =

Palaiosofos: Παλαιόσοφος (Greek); Malatya (Turkish)
- Location in Cyprus
- Coordinates: 35°19′34″N 33°12′26″E
- Country (de jure): Cyprus
  - District: Kyrenia District
- Country (de facto): Northern Cyprus
  - District: Girne District

Population (2011)
  - Total: 180
- Along with Motides
- Time zone: UTC+2 (EET)
  - Summer (DST): UTC+3 (EEST)

Palaiosofos (Greek: Παλαιόσοφος; Turkish: Malatya) is a small village in Cyprus, located southeast of Lapithos. De facto, it is under the control of Northern Cyprus.
