= Acheiropoietos Monastery =

- Μονή Ἀχειροποίητου
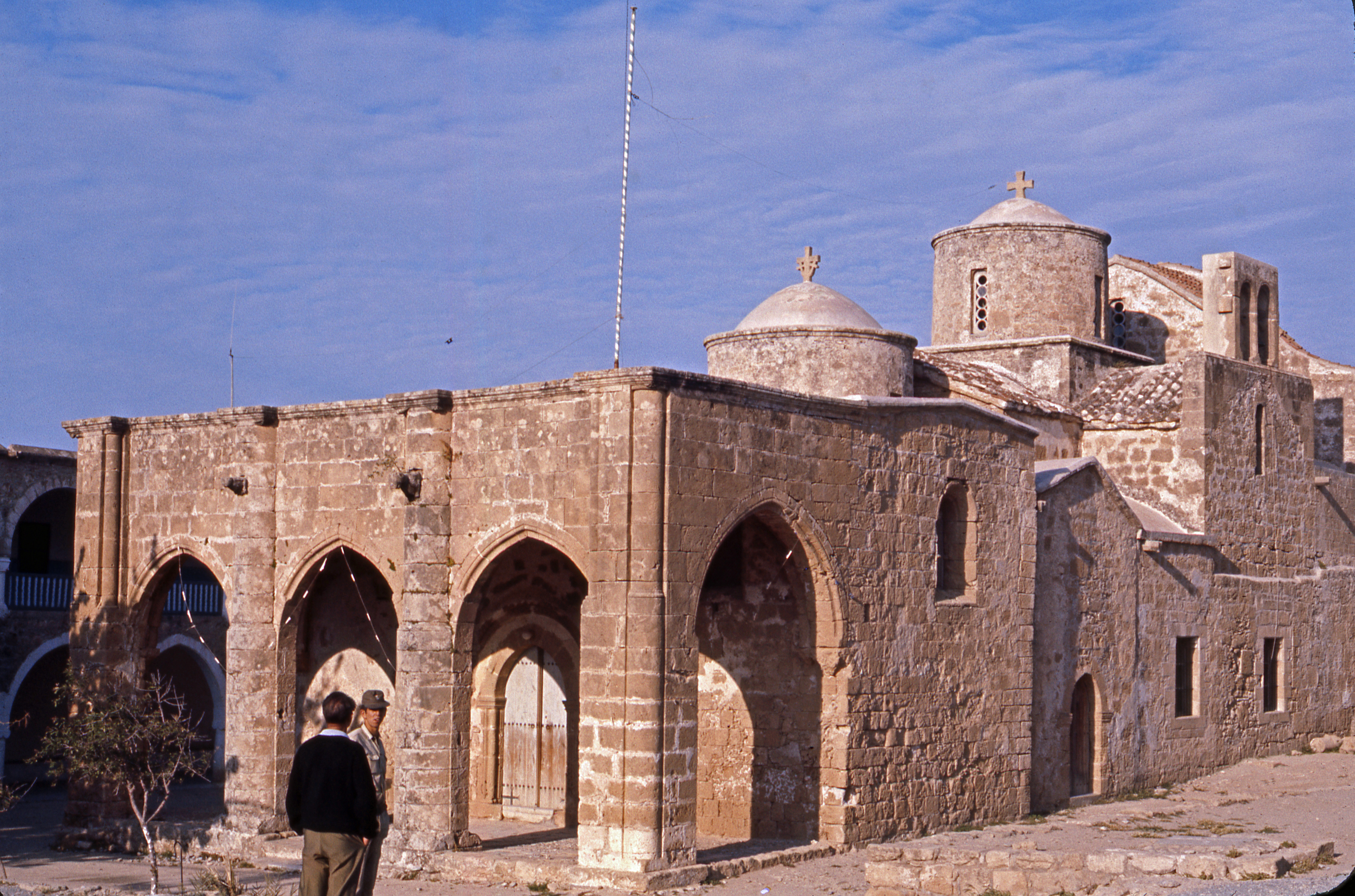
- From the south west, 1973

- Location within Cyprus
- 35°21′10″N 33°11′26″E
- Location: Lambousa
- Country: Cyprus
- Denomination: Greek Orthodox

History
- Founded: 11th century
- Dedication: Virgin Mary

Architecture
- Style: Byzantine architecture

Administration
- Metropolis: Church of Cyprus

The Acheiropoietos Monastery (Greek: Μονή Ἀχειροποίητου, also Παναγία Ἀχειροποίητος and Acheripoetos) was a medieval Byzantine Orthodox monastery in Lambousa near Lapithos, Cyprus.

== History ==
According to tradition, the monastery got its name from an acheiropoietos (meaning made without hands), an icon believed to have been miraculously moved from its original location in Asia Minor by the Virgin Mary to save it from destruction due to the Turkish conquest.

The monastery soon gained prominence and eventually became the religious center of the region. The monastery was the headquarters of the Bishop of Lambousa, one of the 15 bishops on the island until 1222.

According to legend, the shroud of Joseph of Arimathea was once held in the monastery and was taken to Turin, Italy, in 1452 where it remains today and is now known as the Shroud of Turin.

In 1735 the Russian Monk Vasily Barsky visited the monastery and noted that there were nine to ten monks on the premises. Petermann, a German traveler who visited the monastery in 1851, recalled that ninety years before his time Turkish raiders from Karaman had looted and burnt the monastery. By the nineteenth century, the number of monks had been reduced further, and by the twentieth the monastery had no resident monks. Following independence, the monastery was a well known church that was used by the Christian Greek Cypriots but after the Turkish invasion of Cyprus in 1974, the monastery became a military encampment and barracks for the Turkish Army. The complex continues to be closed to the public.

== Architecture ==
The Monastery was built in the 11th century on the foundations of a ruined 6th-century Christian church. Through the centuries, constant rebuilding has given the complex different architectural styles from different time periods, including early Christian, Byzantine, Lusignan, Gothic and Frankish. The present structure has two domes and a Gothic narthex.

== Lambousa Treasure ==
In 1897 a hoard of early Byzantine silver items was uncovered near the monastery. Known as the Lamboussa Treasure, or First Cyprus Treasure, it comprised a variety of liturgical objects dating from 6th or 7th century, perhaps deliberately hidden during the Arab invasion of Cyprus in 653. The hoard was acquired by the British Museum in 1899.
