= Ioannis Tsangaridis =

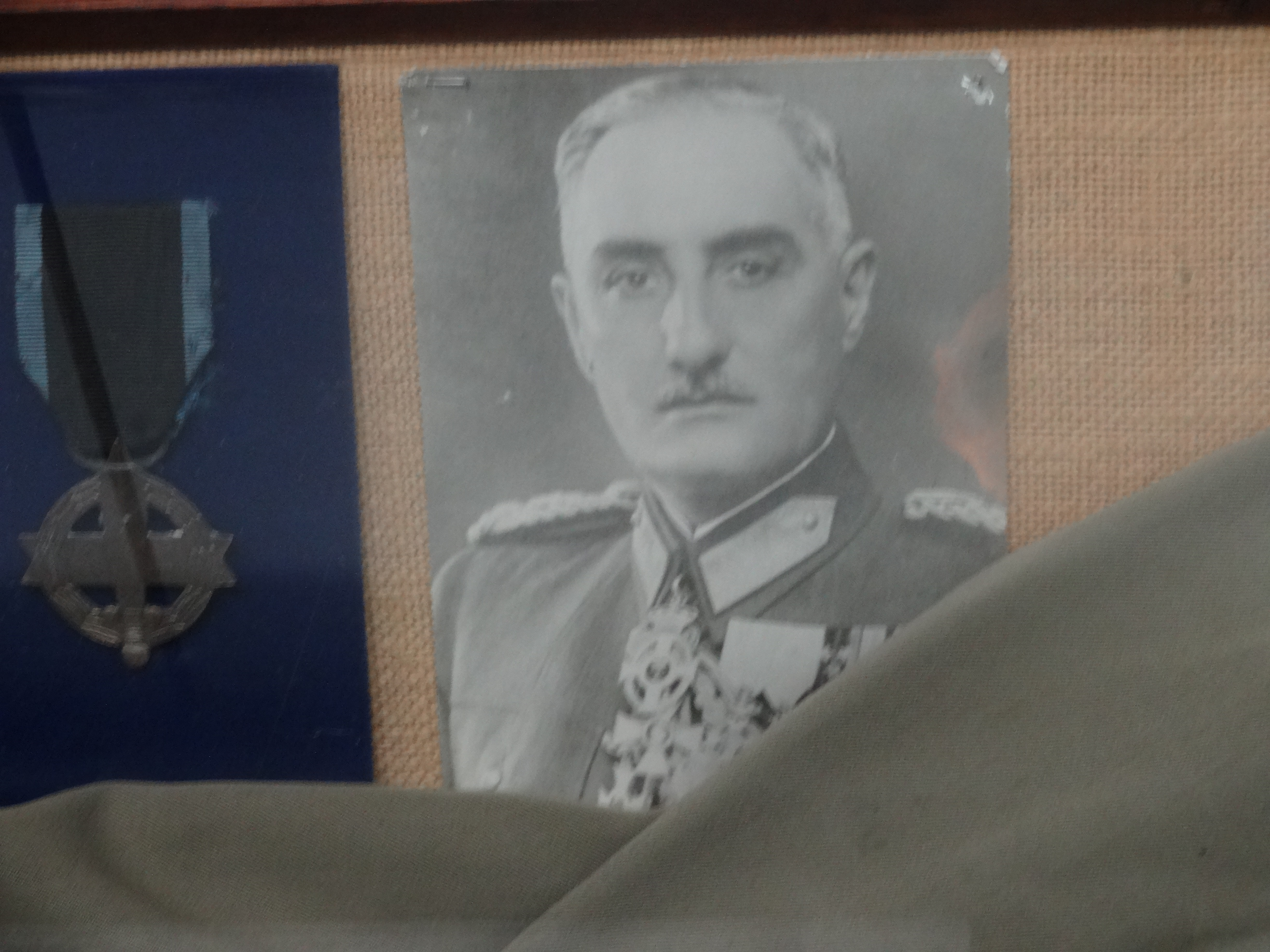
- A photo of Tsagaridis in the War Museum of Athens.
- Native name: Ιωάννης Τσαγγαρίδης
- Born: c. 1887; Lapithos, British Cyprus (now Republic of Cyprus)
- Died: 31 March 1939 Ikaria, Kingdom of Greece
- Allegiance: Kingdom of Greece; Second Hellenic Republic
- Branch: Hellenic Army
- Service years: 1904–1908 (HMC); 1908–1936 (Hellenic Army)
- Rank: Major General
- Conflicts: Macedonian Struggle; Balkan Wars; First Balkan War; Second Balkan War; World War I; Macedonian front; Greco-Turkish War (1919-1922); Battle of the Sakarya (WIA)
- Awards: Order of the Redeemer; Commander of the Order of George I Gold Cross of Valour; War Cross (1916-17 variant); Medal of Military Merit; Grand Officer Cross of the Order of Saint Alexander; Order of the Yugoslav Crown; Officer of the Hungarian Order of Merit

Ioannis Tsangaridis (Greek: Ιωάννης Τσαγγαρίδης; 1887–1939) was a Greek Cypriot General of the Hellenic Army.

He was born in Lapithos in then British-ruled Cyprus, to Christophis Tsangaridis, in 1887. In 1904 he went to Athens for studies in chemistry, but quickly abandoned them and volunteered for the armed bands of the Macedonian Struggle (1904–08). On his return he enlisted in the Hellenic Army, and, after studies at the NCO School, was commissioned as a cavalry officer.

He took part in the Balkan Wars, World War I, and the subsequent Asia Minor Campaign that followed. He distinguished himself at the Battle of the Sakarya where he was heavily wounded in August 1921, forcing him to take an extended leave. Promoted to Major General in 1935, he disagreed with the establishment of the dictatorial Metaxas Regime in 1936, leading to his internal exile in Sifnos and Ikaria. His lingering wounds, coupled with the hardships of exile, led to his death on 31 March 1939.

His brother Theofanis (1895–1962) took part in the 1931 Cyprus revolt and was exiled, going to Athens where he became president of the Cypriot community, while the youngest brother, Odysseas, became an architect in his home town of Lapithos.

His diary has been published in 1987 by the Estia bookshop as Το ημερολόγιο ενός στρατηγού: Σελίδες νεοελληνικής ιστορίας ("The Diary of a General: Pages of Modern Greek History").
