= Lapithos =

Town in Kyrenia District, Cyprus

Lapithos: Λάπηθος (Greek); Lapta (Turkish)
- Municipality
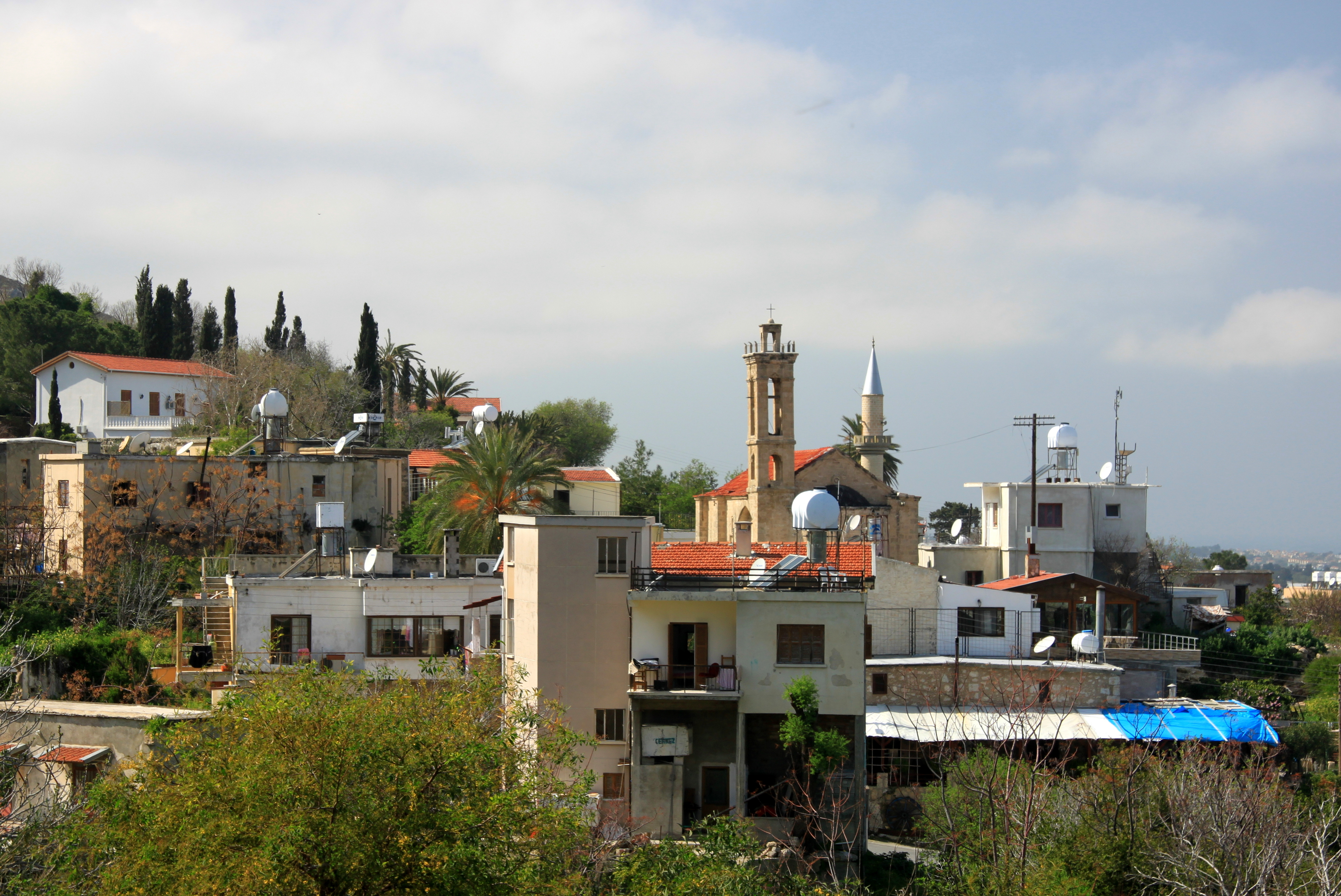
- A general view of Lapithos

- Location in Cyprus
- Coordinates: 35°20′12″N 33°10′27″E
- Country (de jure): Cyprus
  - District: Kyrenia District
- Country (de facto): Northern Cyprus
  - District: Girne District

Government
  - Mayor: Mustafa Aktuğ (in Lapithos); Neoptolemos Kotsapa (in exile)

Population (2011)
  - Total: 7,839
- Time zone: UTC+2 (EET)
  - Summer (DST): UTC+3 (EEST)
- Climate: Csa
- Website: Turkish-Cypriot municipality Cypriot municipality (in exile)

Lapithos or Lapethos (Greek: Λάπηθος; Turkish: Lapta) is a town in Cyprus under the control of Northern Cyprus. It is about 3 kilometres (2 miles) north of the ancient city-kingdom of Lapathus (Lambousa).

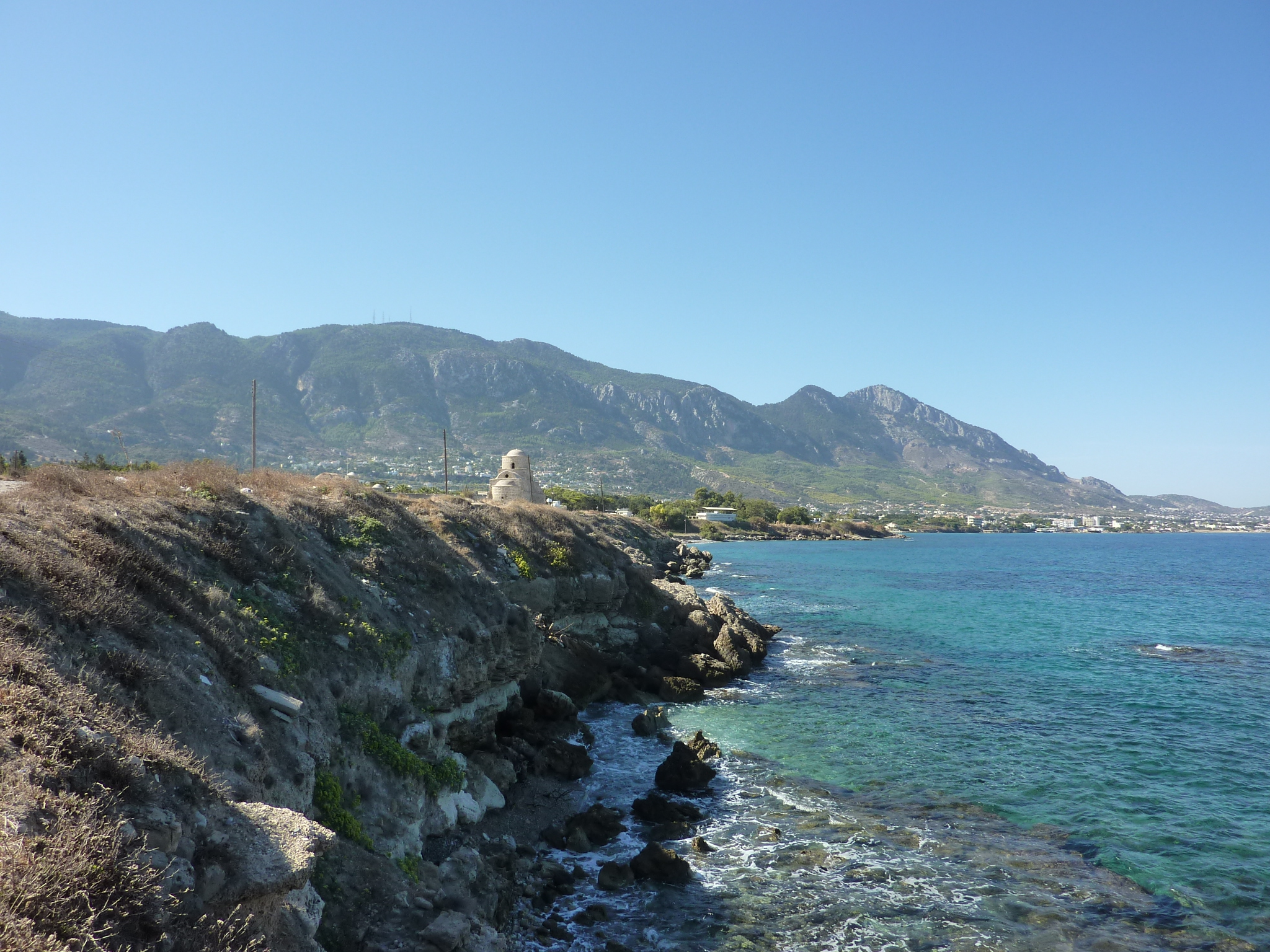
The coast at Lapithos

== History ==
=== Pre-Roman ===
Strabo wrote that Lapethos is a 'construction of the Laconians and of Praxandros'. The philosopher Alexander of Ephesus called it "Imeroessa", meaning "attractive" and "passion-arousing".

Lapithos is usually referred in archaeological literature as a Laconian colony built after the Trojan War, by Praxandros, its first king. However, findings from excavations i.e. pots and pottery wheels date its existence as early as 3000 BC. According to Diodoros of Sicily, who wrote in the 4th century BC, Lapithos was one of the nine kingdoms of Cyprus.

Peisistratos, king of Lapithos, with his flotilla, together with Nicocreon of Salamis and Stasanor of Curion, came to the aid of Alexander the Great, helping him to capture Tyre in Phoenicia. For this reason Alexander declared Cyprus free from the Persians. The last king of Lapethos was Praxippos.

=== Roman, Byzantine and Lusignan periods ===
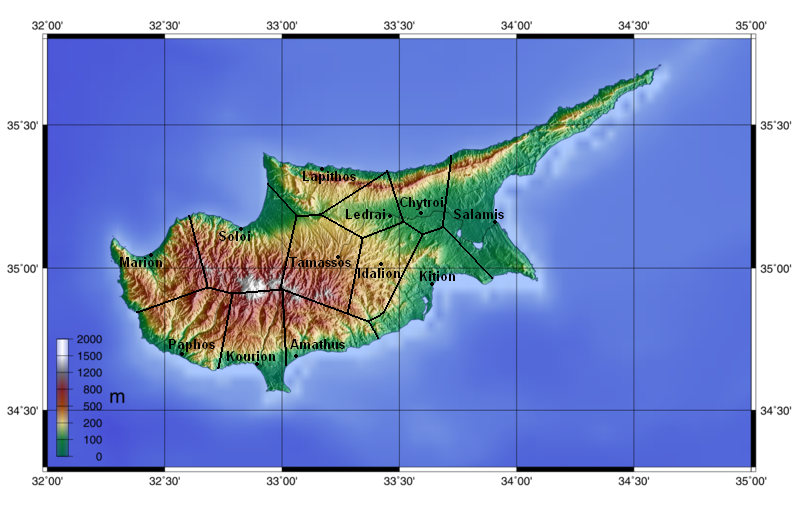
Map showing the ancient city-kingdoms of Cyprus

During the period of the Roman Empire, Lapethos had more than 10,000 inhabitants. It formed one of the four districts of Cyprus. From ancient times, Lapithos became a centre for the processing of copper and more importantly an earthenware centre.

During the proto-Christian period (25 BC – 250 AD) Lapethos experienced a great commercial drive because of the plethora of its produce and its port and its shipyard. During this period Lapethos was given the name Lambousa, "shining", maybe because of its shining wealth or because of its shining beauty and cleanliness or because of its lighthouse.

During the first years of Christianity the apostles Paul, Barnabas and Mark passed by Lapethos coming from Tarsus. According to Barnabas, Lapethos had city walls. He cites that during his second tour with Mark, they stayed outside the walls because they were not given access to the city. In late antiquity, Lapethos enjoyed great prosperity in commerce as well as in riches, art and development. Bishop of Lapithos Theodotos (c. 314–324) died a martyr in Kyrenia while Bishop Didymos was represented at the 4th Ecumenical Synod (451) by Saint Eulaleus or Eulampius, whose chapel can still be found near the Acheiropoietos Monastery.

Lapethos was heavily damaged during the Arab incursions. The population often had to flee and take refuge in the interior.

Upon the Byzantine recovery of Cyprus from the Arabs in 965, Lapithos's refugees returned to their town to rebuild it in a new location, but chose to stay away from the sea, relocating it to the foot of the mountain Pentadactylos.

During the Lusignan period, Lapithos boasted a greater population than Limassol, Famagusta or Paphos. 3,000 troops were stationed at Lapithos under the command of Zanetto Dandolo in the years preceding the Ottoman conquest of Cyprus in 1571. Dandolo was killed during the defence of Nicosia.

=== Ottoman period ===
In 1780 a section of Lapithos was split off to form a new village, Karavas.

=== British rule ===
Lapithos became a municipality soon after the transfer of power to the British rule, with Andreas Koumides becoming the first mayor.

== Archaeological excavations ==
Close to Lapithos there is a large grave burial from the Bronze Age (c. 2000 BC – c. 1800 BC) with hundreds of graves. John Myres did an excavation here in 1913 and Menelaos Markides in 1917. Gravediggers have looted the site multiple times.

=== The Swedish Cyprus Expedition ===
The Swedish Cyprus Expedition excavated around 25 sites in Cyprus from 1927 to 1931. Some of these sites were at Lapithos and the excavations here resulted in a multitude of ceramics and weapons made of copper and bronze. They also found delicate proboscis jugs with elongated necks (beak spouted) and shiny red paint, which are similar to contemporary ceramics from Anatolia.

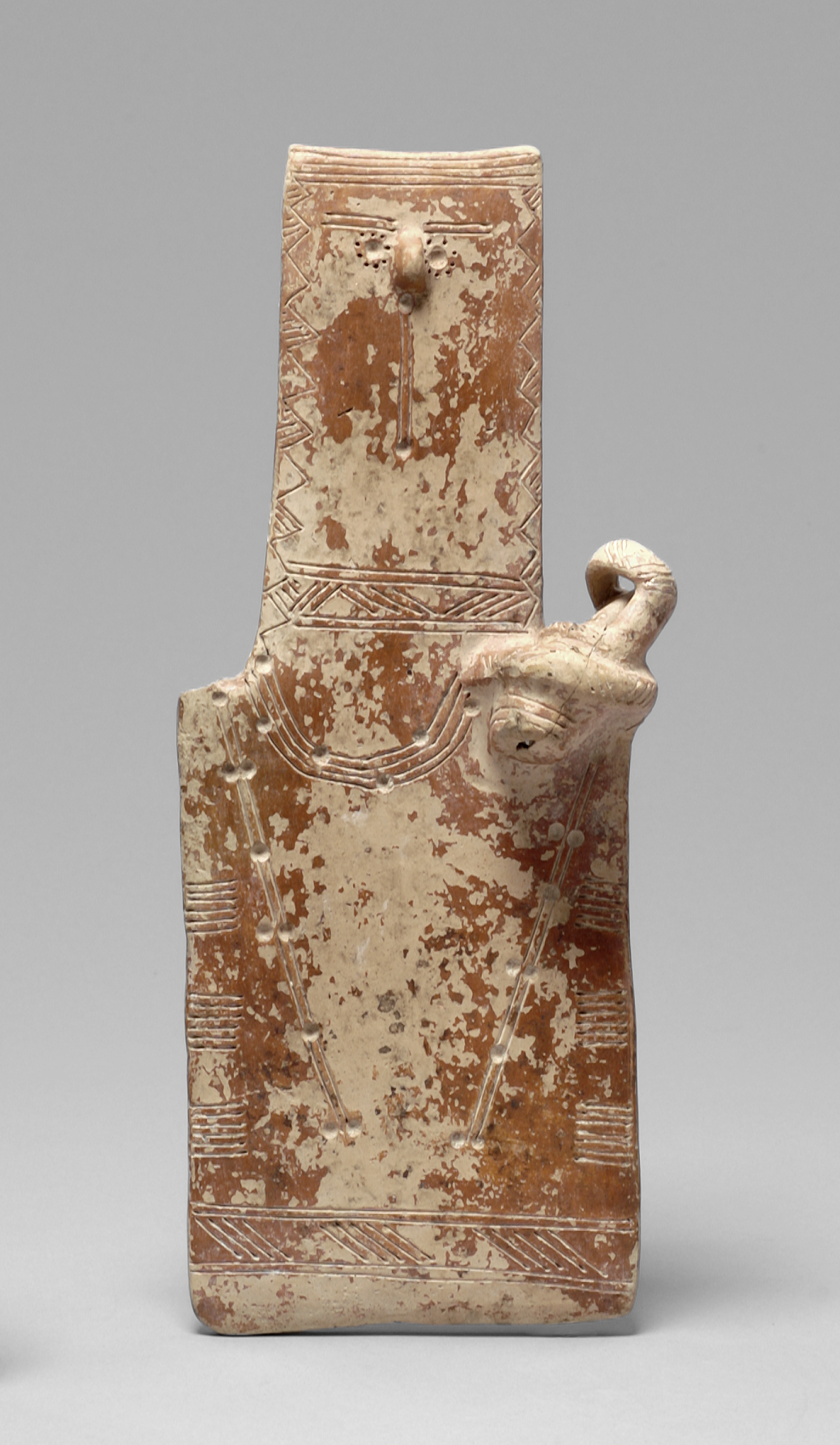
Red Polished plank-shaped figurine of a mother holding a cradle with an infant inside. From Lapithos, Tomb 313A. Early Cypriote III - Middle Cypriote I, c. 2000 BC – c. 1800 BC. This figurine can be seen at Medelhavsmuseet, Stockholm.

The oldest settlement, dating from the Neolithic or Chalcolithic period, is located to the west of the village of Lapithos and is called Alonia ton Plakon. The cite was damaged by humans and natural causes during the course of history, therefore, the area of the settlement is difficult to define. The eastern settlement’s preservation deteriorated because of winter floods and Roman, Byzantine, and modern cultivation. Therefore, only a few remains of houses were found, such as some stone foundation walls, hearths and three bothroi cut into the rock. The site probably had four periods of habitations. After the site was abandoned, it was disturbed in the Geometric period when the place was used as a necropolis, therefore the archaeologists found tombs cut into the rock. During this period, they used stones from the foundations of the Neolithic houses as doors to tombs. The western settlement contained the remains of four huts. Three hearths were also found. The finds were mainly of three classes: objects of flint, stone and pottery. The brown coloured flint is very common. The stone objects are mostly axe heads, hammers and chisels. Most of the pottery belonged to these classes: red polished ware, plain white ware and painted ware. The settlements are dated to 3000 BC, although the eastern settlement should be dated a bit earlier than the western.

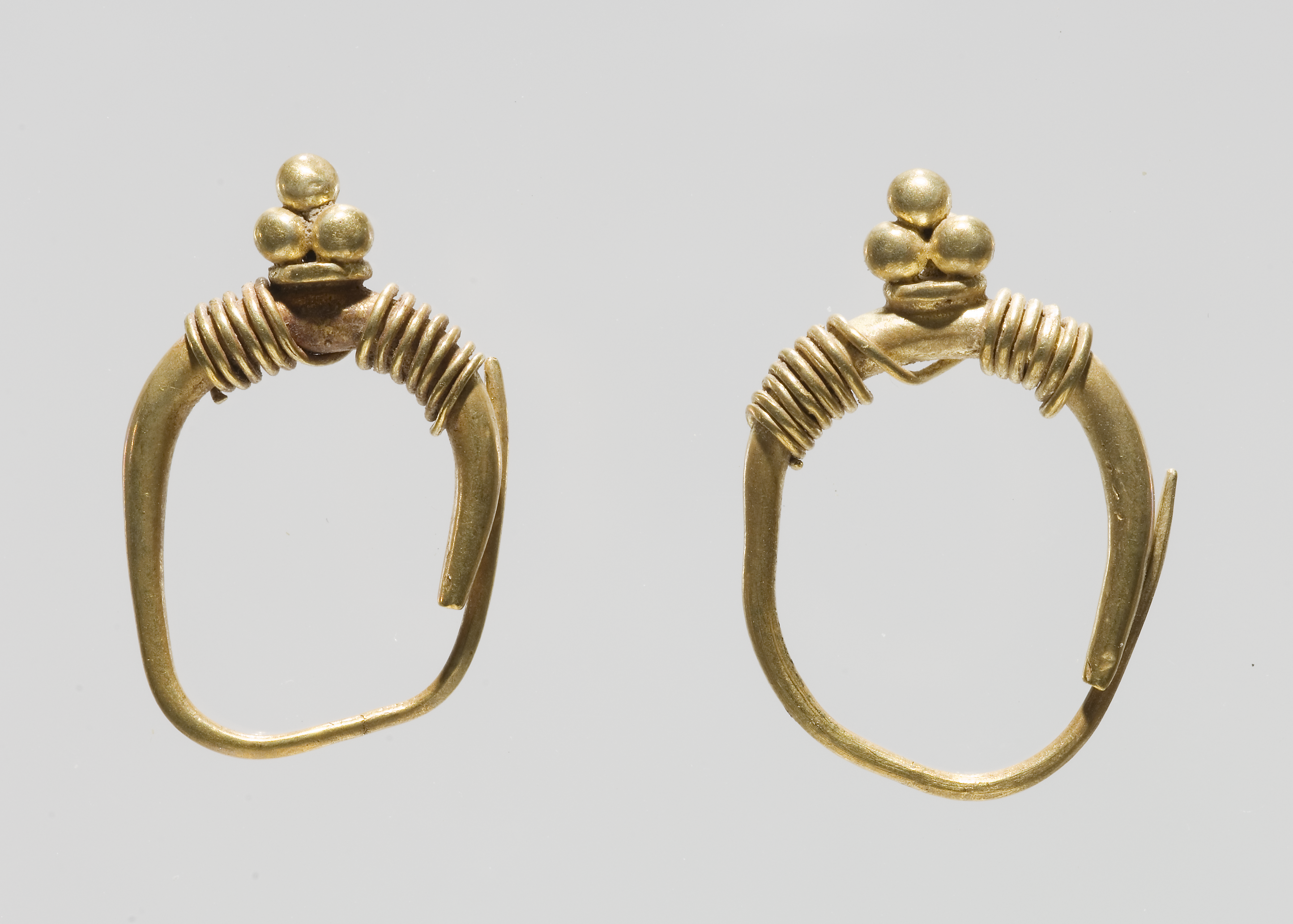
Gold earrings with overlapping ends. A cluster of small gold balls probably depicting grapes. From Lapithos, Tomb 420. Ca. 1050–950 B.C. These earrings can be seen at Medelhavsmuseet, Stockholm.

To the west of Lapithos, at Vrysi tou Barba, (Greek: Grandfather’s fountain) the expedition continued to excavate a Bronze Age necropolis. The site consists of a white limestone rock, sloping towards the sea, and has been affected by repeated flooding from mountain streams, therefore there’s not many traces left of the necropolis. The Swedes were not the first to excavate here although they were the first to publish their investigations. Both John Myres and Menelaos Markides from the Cyprus Museum, excavated here in 1913 and 1917. The Swedish Cyprus Expedition excavated twenty-three tombs for two months to obtain a representative series of tombs from a limited area. Most of the tombs found here were of the dromos type, with three circular chambers that open up from the dromos. They used thin slabs of local limestone as doors, and smaller stones around the sides to keep the larger limestone in place. The excavators could noticed that the tombs were used repeatedly and sometimes cleared out between the burials. Both men and women were buried here. Most of the tombs are dated to the Early Cypriote II Middle Cypriote II period but was used during the Early Cypriote III as well. In the tombs they found a lot of pottery of Red Polished Ware.

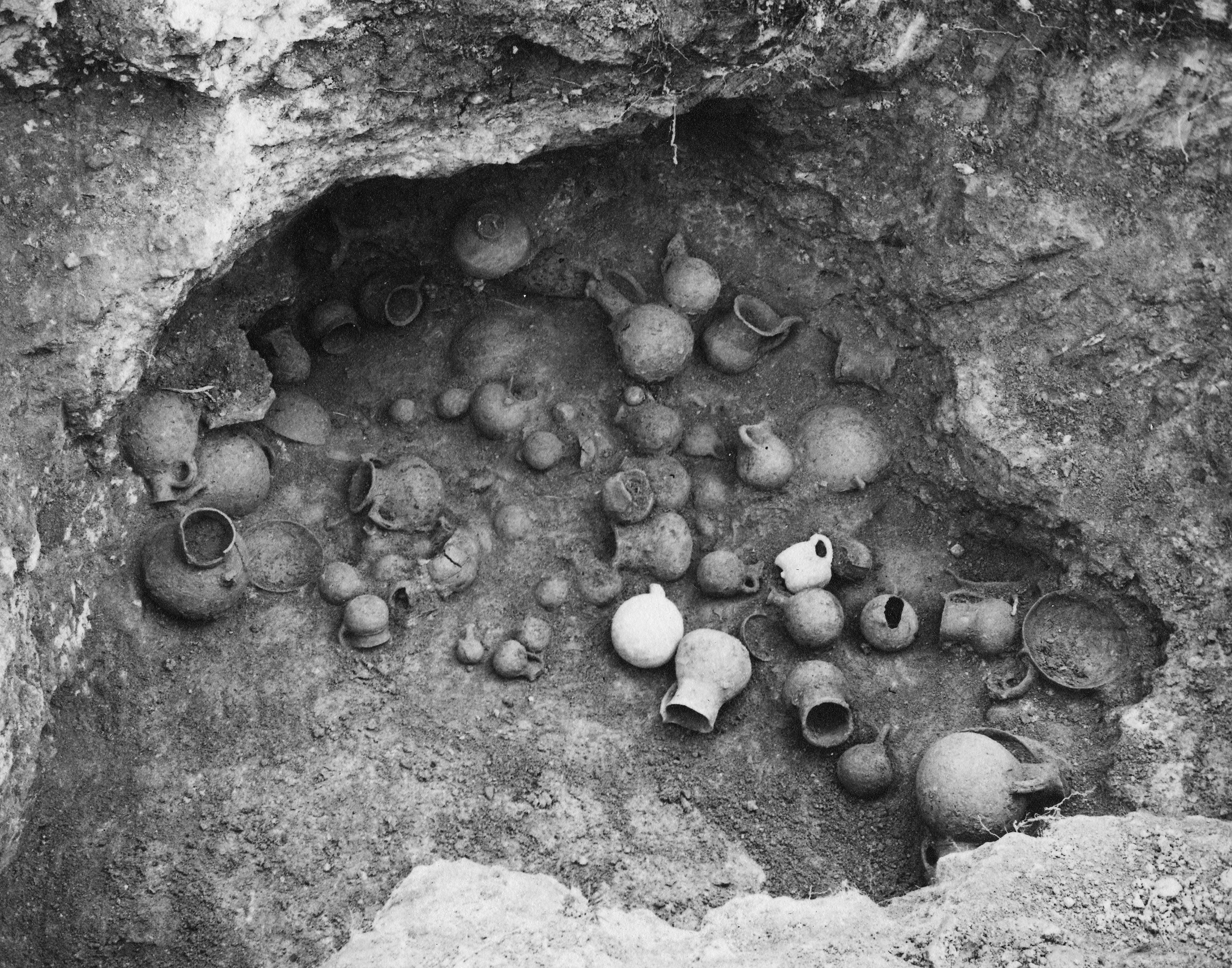
Tomb 702, in situ. Lapithos.

After the excavation at Vrysi tou Barba the Swedish Cyprus Expedition continued with the Iron age necropolis of Kastros from November 1927 until the end of April 1928. This site had never been excavated before but was plundered in Byzantine times. Here the Swedish Cyprus Expedition excavated around thirty graves. The Iron age tombs were cut into the rock. The shape of the tombs differs throughout the different periods but most of them are different kinds of dromos tombs. As seen on many necropolises in Cyprus a lot of the tombs were used for repeated but successive burials which indicate that they were family graves. Some of the graves were extremely rich in grave goods. For example in tomb 403 and 420, women were buried carrying gold jewellery and other gold ornaments such as five gold plaques with figural representations, spindle whorls, as well as mountings that probably once decorated a headgear.

== Geography ==
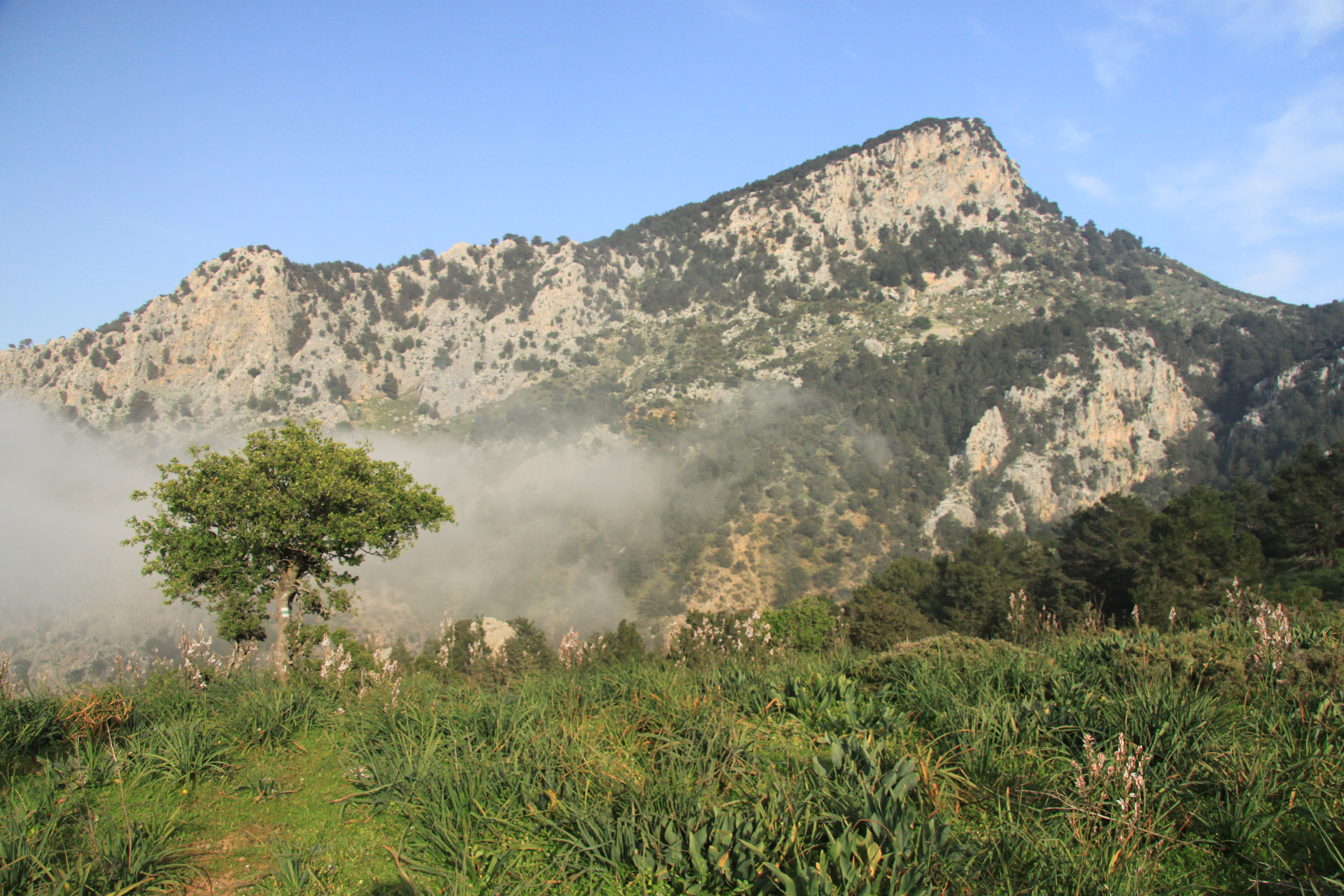
Landscape near Lapithos

Situated about 14 kilometres (8.7 mi) west of Kyrenia, on the northern coast of Cyprus, It's bordered on the east by Karavas, on the west by Basileia and on the south with the villages of Sysklhpos, Agridaki, and Larnaka tis Lapithou. It spreads from the high mountains of Pentadactylos to the waters of the Mediterranean. It rests against the background of the highest peak of Pentadactylos, the Kyparissovouno.

== Economy ==
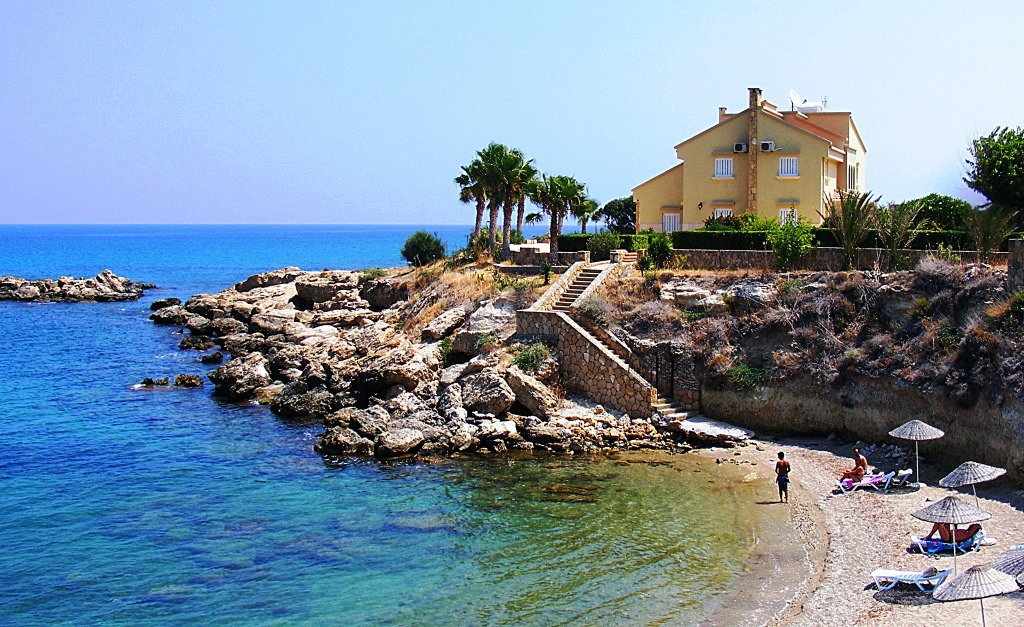
A beach and a house standing by it in Lapithos. Tourism is an important source of income for the town.

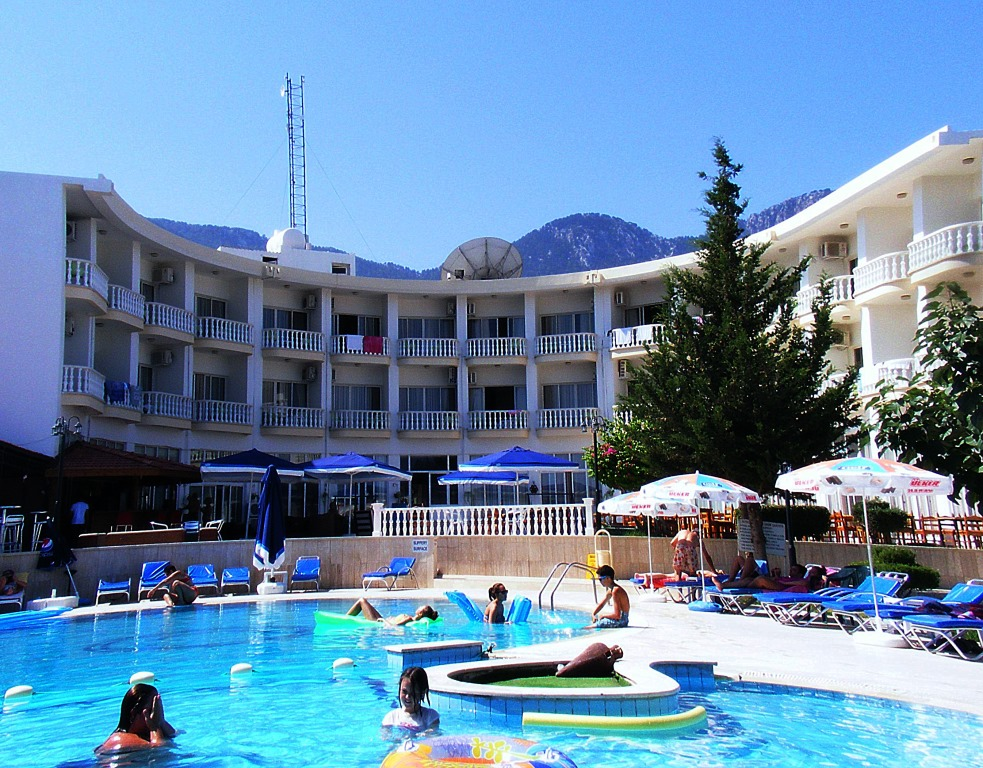
A hotel in Lapithos

Civil servants and workers constitute the majority of the working population. Tourism, agriculture, small-scale industry and fishing are also important sources of income, practised by the rest of the population.

=== Agriculture ===
Thanks to its spring, Lapithos has rich water resources and fertile land. This results in an agricultural sector with a diverse range of products. Citrus is a major product, with the lemons of Lapithos being especially renowned. In the hills, olive and carob trees grow. Among other trees and crops cultivated are pistachio, konari and kolokasi. Mulberry trees are also planted and provide protection to lemon trees from the salt and winds, as well as the silk that is used in the silk industry and handicrafts. Lapithos also has a great variety of plums, including the "flokkaroues" variety unique to the town.

== Politics ==
=== Turkish Cypriot municipality ===
The Municipality of Lapithos (Lapta) that administers the town was founded on 19 November 1974 by the cabinet of the Autonomous Turkish Cypriot Administration. The current mayor is Fuat Namsoy of the National Unity Party. He has been in this position since 1994.

=== Greek Cypriot municipality ===
The Municipality of Lapithos was established in 1878 by the British as one of the ten new municipalities after the beginning of their rule in Cyprus. The municipality has a horned Athena on its logo, in reference to an ancient coin found in Lapithos. In 1974, this municipality was forced into exile, and its municipal council operating then stayed at their positions until 1987. The municipality is currently located at 37 Ammochostou Street and shares its headquarters with the municipality-in-exile of Kythrea. The current mayor-in-exile is Neoptolemos Kotsapas.

Before 1974, the village was divided into six parishes (enories), each with its own civil and religious administration, community council, an ecclesiastical authority with a Greek Orthodox priest, and cemetery. The parishes were as follows:

- Upper Lapithos: the parishes of Ayia Anastasia and Ayia Paraskevi, collectively referred as the Pano Enories (Upper Parishes)
- Ayios Theodhoros in the west
- Timios Prodhromos in the centre
- Ayios Loukas in the centre
- Ayios Minas in the east.

In addition to these parishes, the seventh administrative division was the Turkish Cypriot quarter.

== Churches and mosques ==
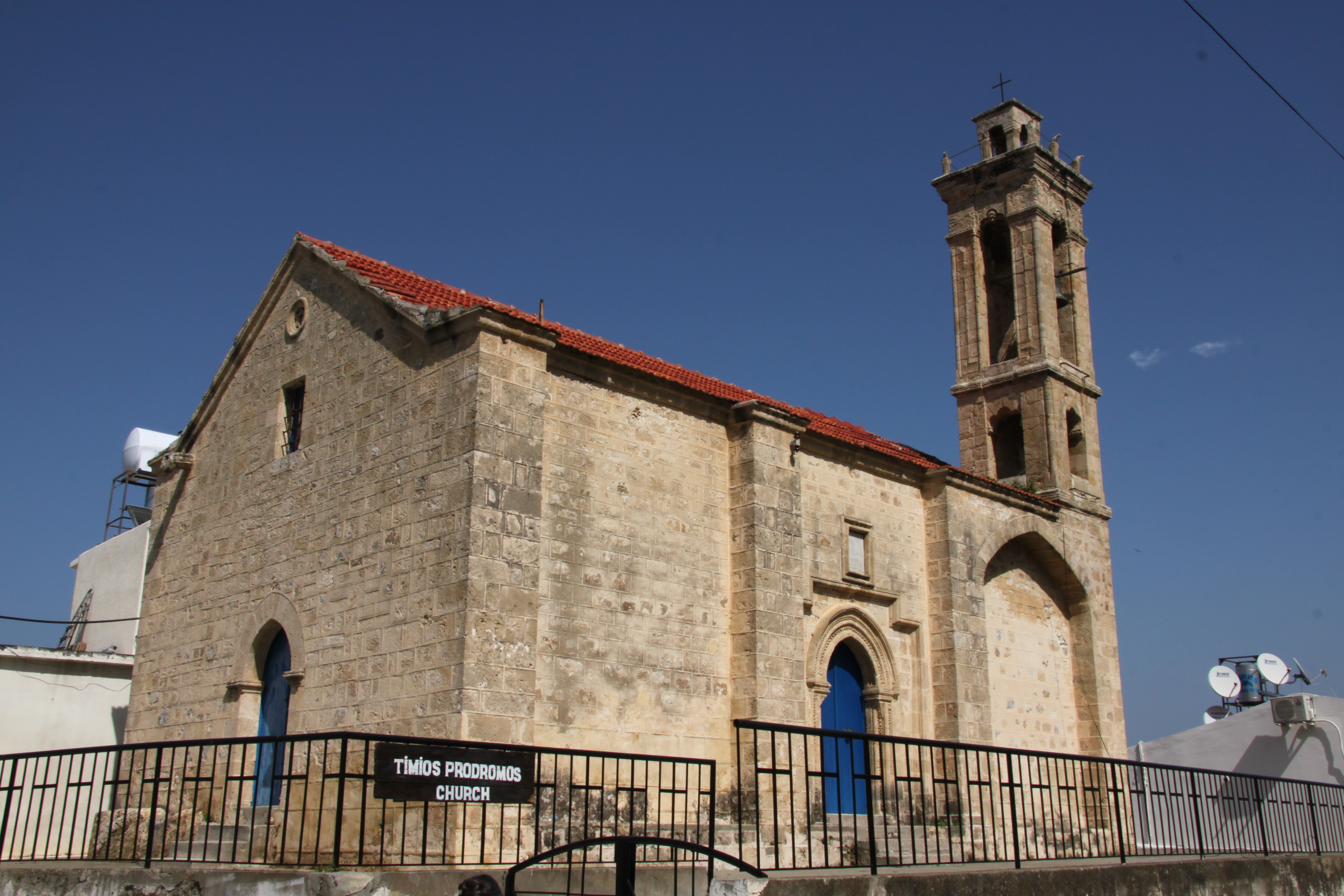
Timios Prodromos Church in Lapithos

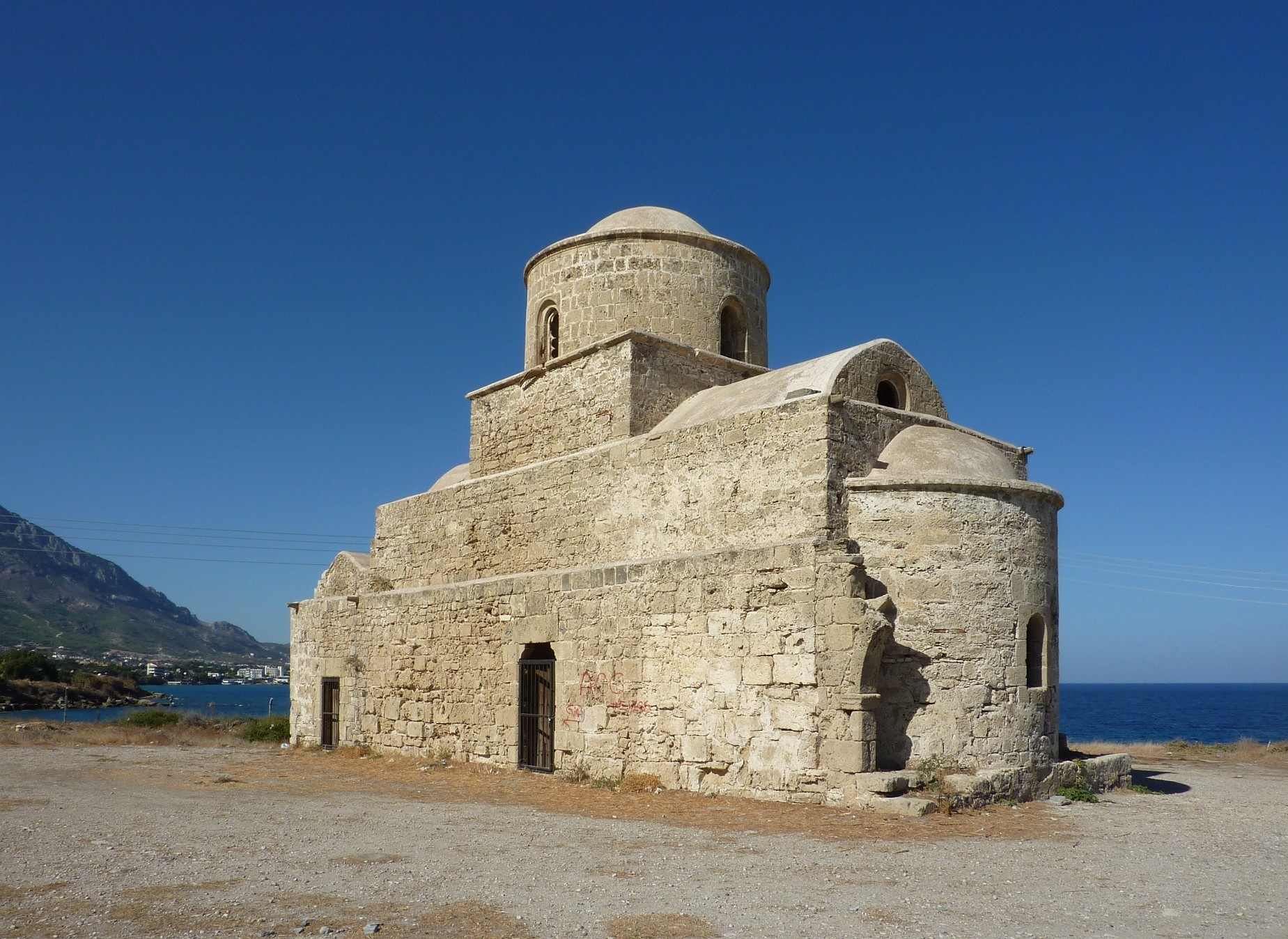
Saint Evlalios Church

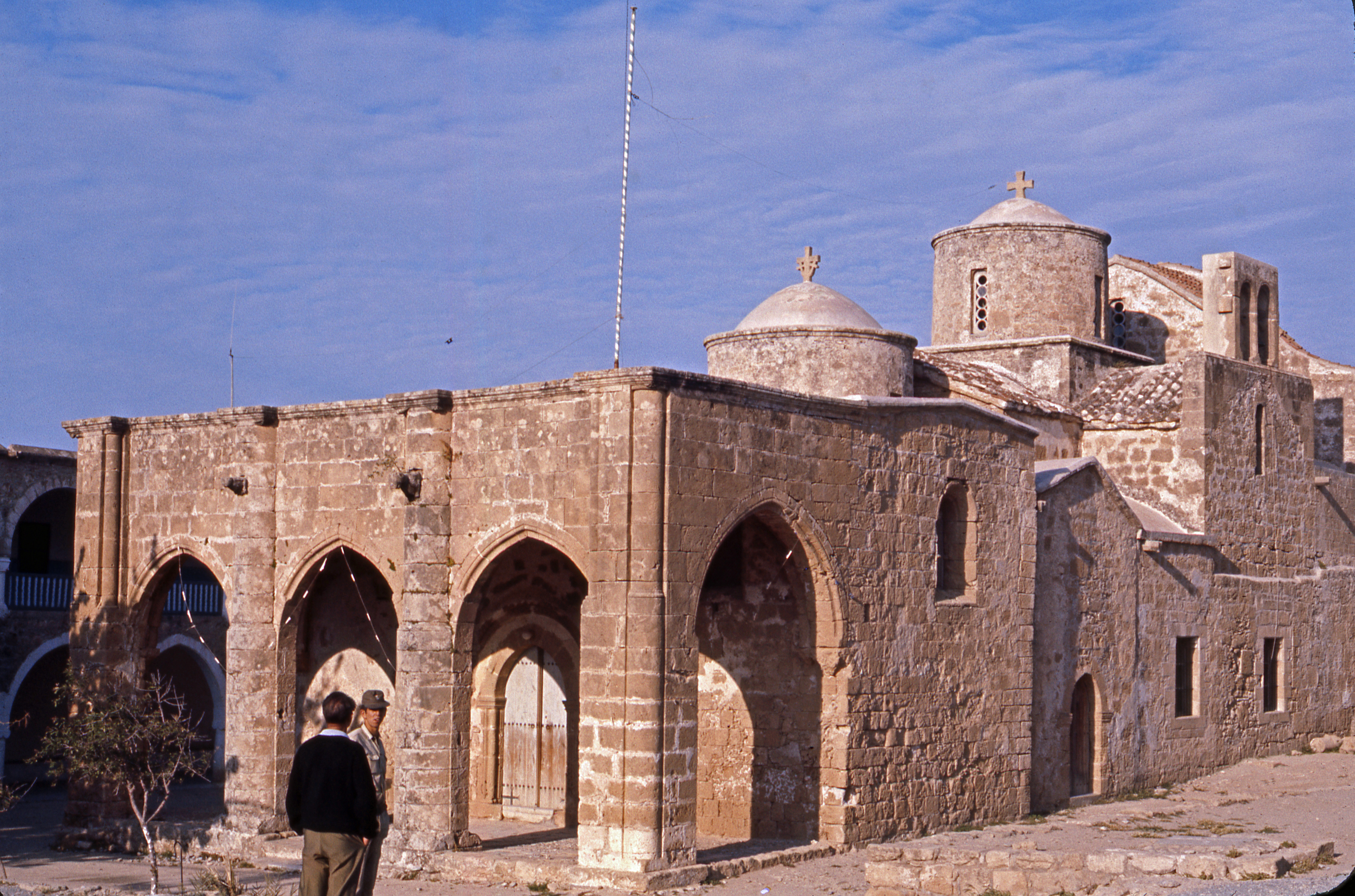
Acheiropoietos Monastery

Lapithos has 14 churches, two mosques and two monasteries. These include:

- Saint Theodoros Church: The church was built in 1834. It has two white pillars with Byzantine crosses in its yard a gallery section dated to the 17th century, with well-painted doors. It is rumoured to have previously been a chapel in a cemetery, and also has an olive press.
- Saint Minas Church: Located in the east, the church was built in 1843. The church has icons of Saint Minas on a horse, it also used to have a large icon of Saint Minas from the early 18th century.
- Saint Anastasia Church and Monastery: The church is located on a position that overlooks Lapithos, where the former Lapithos Castle used to stand. It was built in the 18th century and has many religious depictions on the walls. It has a chapel dedicated to Ayia Evdokia.
- Saint Paraskevi Church: It was built next to the ruins of an old church in 1892 and housed icons from this old church until 1974, when they were looted following the invasion.
- Saint Luka Church: It was built in 1850. It has been renovated and is now used as a ballet school.
- Timios Prodromos Church: The church is in the centre of Lapithos. It was built in the 17th century in the Gothic style. The bell tower has depictions of human faces, animals and plants. The west side has a Star of David on the walls.
- Saint Evlalios Church: The church is located at the coast, to the east of the Acheiropoietos Monastery and is dedicated to Saint Evlalios, who was a bishop who once lived in Lambousa. The present-day church was built on the ruins of an early Christian church, whose remains still stand in the form of the four columns of the central arches of the present-day church. One of these columns has a Byzantine cross engraved in it. In excavations, three different layers of mosaic tiles from three different eras have been found. This indicates that the church has been renovated in the 6th, 11th and 14th–15th centuries.
- Saint Evlambios Church: To the east of the Ahkiropietos Monastery, the church was used as a pagan tomb and was later converted to a chapel in the early Christian era. The niches are characteristic of Roman tombs and traces of frescoes are present. It has no narthex, but does have an abscess.

The mosques are as follows:

- Haydar Pashazade Mehmet Bey Mosque: There is an engraving in the mosque indicating the year 1870, this could be the date of the renovation or the construction of the mosque. It has a unique feature in terms of its architecture in Cyprus; a dome covers the prayer area and rests on an octagonal drum and a small half dome at the four corners. Due to its unique Ottoman architecture, it has been described as "one of the island's most handsome stone mosques".
- Esseyid Elhaç Mehmet Agha Mosque, also known as the Upper Lapta Mosque: It is made of hewn stone and has a rectangular structure. It was first built by the tax collector Esseyid Elhaç Mehmet Agha in 1828, but this mosque had an earthen roof and no minaret. Between 1887 and 1889, the Sayed Mehmet Agha Foundation, led by the trustee Hadji Veli Effendi, built a patio, tile roof coverings and a 7.6 m (25 ft) minaret. In 1899, there was also a school that belonged to the same foundation. The hewn stone minaret on the mosque's eastern side was demolished in 1974 and the current concrete minaret was constructed in 1976.

== Culture ==
The town annually hosts the Lapta Tourism Festival in the first week of June. Numerous cultural and sporting activities, folk dance shows by groups from various countries and concerts take place during the festival.

Lapithos has a unique needlework with original patterns, known as the Lapta lace (Turkish: Lapta Hesap İşi). The handicraft is preserved as a product for tourists, and is made on linen fabric with the cross-stitch technique. Lapithos have also produced the culturally important walnut wood chests for Cyprus. The town also has a tradition of knife-making; its knives traditionally had handles made of goat horn and were known for the sharpness and workmanship. The town is one of the most important silk-producing centres in the island and has been historically that way. The silk is used locally and island-wide in handicrafts and for weaving.

Lapithos hosts a vibrant sports life concentrated on the sea. Water sports such as diving, windsurfing, jet-skiing, water-skiing and parasailing are popular. Horse riding and cycling are also practised. The town is the centre of several hiking trails protected by Natura 2000; these trails pass through the area's forests, ruins of ancient cities and temples, churches and historical warehouses. The town is home to the football club Lapta Türk Birliği S.K. They played in Süper Lig, the top-level division of Turkish Cypriot football in the 2014–15 season, but were relegated as they came in last place.

== Notable people ==
- Andreas G. Orphanides, Professor of History and Archaeology, Music Composer
- George of Cyprus, Byzantine geographer
- Gregory II of Constantinople, Ecumenical Patriarch of Constantinople from 1283 to 1289
- Ioannis Tsangaridis, Greek general

== International relations ==
=== Twin towns – sister cities ===
Lapithos is unofficially twinned with:

- Büyükçekmece, Turkey (since 2007)
- Kemer, Antalya, Turkey (since 2012)
- Karpoš, Skopje, North Macedonia (since 2015)
