= Interim Parliament of the Turkish Republic of Northern Cyprus =

This is a list of members of parliament (MPs) who were a part of the Interim Assembly of the Republic which met 4 times awaiting the formation of the Founding Parliament of the Turkish Republic of Northern Cyprus following the establishment of the Turkish Republic of Northern Cyprus. All 40 elected members of the interim assembly were coming from the Federated Assembly. These members were elected at the 1981 parliamentary election, which was held on 28 June 1981.

The tenure of office of this parliament was from 15 November 1983 to 6 December 1983.

Party	Members	Proportion
National Unity Party	18	45.0%
Communal Liberation Party	10	25.0%
Republican Turkish Party	6	15.0%
Democratic People's Party	1	2.5%
Nationalist Turkish Party	1	2.5%
Party of Working People	1	2.5%
Independents	3	7.5%
Total	40	100%
Parliament was formed Interim Parliament →

== Presidential Committee ==
The same presidential committee continued to its office from the last Federated Assembly.

Title	Name	Period	Party
Speaker of the Assembly	Nejat Konuk	15 November 1983 - 6 December 1983	Independent
Deputy Speaker of the Assembly	Ekrem Ural	15 November 1983 - 6 December 1983	Independent
Administrative Clerks	Taşkent Atasayan	15 November 1983 - 6 December 1983	UBP
Administrative Clerks	Ali Atun	15 November 1983 - 6 December 1983	UBP
Administrative Clerks	Ali Volkan	15 November 1983 - 6 December 1983	TKP

== Members ==
=== Lefkoşa ===
Member of Parliament	Party
Salih Coşar	National Unity Party
Kenan Atakol	National Unity Party
Hakkı Atun	National Unity Party
Olgun Paşalar	National Unity Party
Nazif Borman	National Unity Party
İrsen Küçük	National Unity Party
Enver Emin	National Unity Party
Özel Tahsin	National Unity Party
Alpay Durduran	Communal Liberation Party
Ali Volkan	Communal Liberation Party
Erdal Süreç	Communal Liberation Party
İbrahim Koreli	Communal Liberation Party
Özker Özgür	Republican Turkish Party
Mehmet Civa	Republican Turkish Party
Ergün Vehbi	Republican Turkish Party
Nejat Konuk	Independent
Ekrem Ural	Independent
Fuat Veziroğlu	Independent

=== Gazimağusa ===
Member of Parliament	Party
Derviş Eroğlu	National Unity Party
Mustafa Karpaslı	National Unity Party
Orhan Zihni Bilgehan	National Unity Party
Eşber Serakıncı	National Unity Party
Ali Atun	National Unity Party
Mehmet Bayram	National Unity Party
Taşkent Atasayan	National Unity Party
Mehmet Altınay	Communal Liberation Party
İsmail Bozkurt	Communal Liberation Party
Çetin Veziroğlu	Communal Liberation Party
Hüseyin Angolemli	Communal Liberation Party
Naci Talat Usar	Republican Turkish Party
Hüseyin Celâl	Republican Turkish Party
İsmet Kotak	Democratic People's Party
İsmail Tezer	Nationalist Turkish Party

=== Girne ===
Member of Parliament	Party
Mustafa Hacıahmetoğlu	National Unity Party
Mustafa Çağatay	National Unity Party
Oğuz Ramadan Korhan	National Unity Party
Esat Varoğlu	Communal Liberation Party
Gözel Halim	Communal Liberation Party
Fadıl Çağda	Republican Turkish Party
Hasan Özbaflı	Party of Working People
