= Founding Parliament of the Turkish Republic of Northern Cyprus =

This is a list of members of Parliament (MPs) elected or assigned to the Founding Assembly of the Turkish Republic of Northern Cyprus. 40 elected members of the founding assembly were coming from the Federated Assembly as the base members. These members were elected at the 1981 parliamentary election, which was held on 28 June 1981.

30 other members were assigned by the Presidency, various political parties, non-governmental organisations, trade unions, chamber of industry, chamber of commerce and the bar association. Fazıl Küçük also assigned one member by himself. The representative members were regarded as independent unless stated otherwise.

Founding Assembly's duty started on 6 December 1983

The list below indicates the MPs in the parties at the time they took oath.

Party	Members	Proportion
National Unity Party	18	26%
Communal Liberation Party	10	15%
Republican Turkish Party	6	9%
Democratic People's Party	2	3%
Turkish Union Party	1	1%
Nationalist Turkish Party	1	1%
Party of Working People	1	1%
Social Democrat Party	1	1%
Independents	30	43%
Total	70	100%

== Composition ==
=== Elected members ===
Elected members were the members who were already chosen as MPs for the Federated Assembly of the Turkish Federated State of Cyprus and thus served during the Interim Parliament of the Turkish Republic of Northern Cyprus. The Founding Assembly did not have seats allocated for districts. Following list only designate their district of election during 1981 parliamentary election.

==== Lefkoşa ====
Member of Parliament	Party
Salih Coşar	National Unity Party
Kenan Atakol	National Unity Party
Hakkı Atun	National Unity Party
Olgun Paşalar	National Unity Party
Nazif Borman	National Unity Party
İrsen Küçük	National Unity Party
Enver Emin	National Unity Party
Özel Tahsin	National Unity Party
Alpay Durduran	Communal Liberation Party
Ali Volkan	Communal Liberation Party
Erdal Süreç	Communal Liberation Party
İbrahim Koreli	Communal Liberation Party
Özker Özgür	Republican Turkish Party
Mehmet Civa	Republican Turkish Party
Ergün Vehbi	Republican Turkish Party
Nejat Konuk	Independent
Ekrem Ural	Independent
Fuat Veziroğlu	Independent

==== Gazimağusa ====
Member of Parliament	Party
Derviş Eroğlu	National Unity Party
Mustafa Karpaslı	National Unity Party
Orhan Zihni Bilgehan	National Unity Party
Eşber Serakıncı	National Unity Party
Ali Atun	National Unity Party
Mehmet Bayram	National Unity Party
Taşkent Atasayan	National Unity Party
Mehmet Altınay	Communal Liberation Party
İsmail Bozkurt	Communal Liberation Party
Çetin Veziroğlu	Communal Liberation Party
Hüseyin Angolemli	Communal Liberation Party
Naci Talat Usar	Republican Turkish Party
Hüseyin Celâl	Republican Turkish Party
İsmet Kotak	Democratic People's Party
İsmail Tezer	Nationalist Turkish Party

==== Girne ====
Member of Parliament	Party
Mustafa Hacıahmetoğlu	National Unity Party
Mustafa Çağatay	National Unity Party
Oğuz Ramadan Korhan	National Unity Party
Esat Varoğlu	Communal Liberation Party
Gözel Halim	Communal Liberation Party
Fadıl Çağda	Republican Turkish Party
Hasan Özbaflı	Party of Working People

=== Representative members ===
Representative members were not elected to the assembly. They were assigned by political parties, individuals or institutions listed below. Assigned people were regarded as independent unless they were assigned by a political party or was already a council minister from a party at the day of assignation.

Member of Parliament	Assigned by
Ahmet Yusuf Atamsoy	Democratic People's Party (Note: Atamsoy was assigned by the Presidency while he was serving as the Minister of Education as a representative of Democratic People's Party.)
Baki Topaloğlu	Turkish Union Party
Raif Denktaş	Social Democrat Party
Tünay Baykara	Association of the Families of Martyrs
Tonguz Ali Ayman	Bar
Hilmi Refik	Chamber of Commerce
Yüksel Ratip	Chamber of Industry
Hüseyin Gültekin	Farmers Union
Hüseyin Curcioğlu	Federation of Trade Unions
Ahmet Ötüken	Federation of Trade Unions
Lütfi Özter	Federation of Trade Unions
Sadi Togan	Journalists Association
Özkul Özyiğit	Livestock Producers Union
Ali Bilgi	Mücahits Association
Güner Göktuğ	Mücahits Association
Halil M Paşa	Mücahits Association
Ata Öncel	Physicians Union
Arif Hasan Tahsin Desem	Trade Union of Primary School Teachers
Numan Ali Levent	Trade Union of Secondary School Teachers
Ferhat Ulutaş	Veterans Association
Ahmet Yaşar Akar	Fazıl Küçük
Kaya Bekiroğlu	Presidency
Aytaç Beşeşler	Presidency
Yılmaz Bora	Presidency
Mehmet Can	Presidency
Necati Ertekün	Presidency
Oktay Feridun	Presidency
Orhan Kahya	Presidency
Osman Örek	Presidency
Ergün Orhan Şevket	Presidency

== Term and changes of affiliation ==
Assigned members were not elected to the assembly. They were assigned by political parties, individuals or institutions listed below. Assigned people were regarded as independent unless they were assigned by a political party or was a council minister from a party at the day he was assigned.

=== A ===
Member of Parliament	Affiliation	Term
Ahmet Yaşar Akar	Independent	6 December 1983 - 22 December 1983
Ahmet Yaşar Akar	Independent Solidarity Group	22 December 1983 - 8 July 1985
Mehmet Altınay	Communal Liberation Party	6 December 1983 - 8 July 1985
Hüseyin Angolemli	Communal Liberation Party	6 December 1983 - 8 July 1985
Kenan Atakol	National Unity Party	6 December 1983 - 8 July 1985
Taşkent Atasayan	National Unity Party	6 December 1983 - 8 July 1985
Ali Atun	National Unity Party	6 December 1983 - 8 July 1985
Hakkı Atun	National Unity Party	6 December 1983 - 8 July 1985
Ahmet Yusuf Atamsoy	Democratic People's Party (Note: Atamsoy was assigned by the Presidency while he was serving as the Minister of Education as a representative of Democratic People's Party.)	6 December 1983 - 25 January 1984
Ahmet Yusuf Atamsoy	Social Democracy Group	25 January 1984 - 5 December 1984
Ahmet Yusuf Atamsoy	Democratic People's Party	5 December 1984 - 29 January 1985
Ahmet Yusuf Atamsoy	Social Democracy Group	29 January 1985 - 8 July 1985
Tonguz Ali Ayman	Independent	6 December 1983 - 8 July 1985

=== B ===
Member of Parliament	Affiliation	Term
Tünay Baykara	Independent	6 December 1983 - 22 December 1983
Tünay Baykara	Independent Solidarity Group	22 December 1983 - 25 January 1984
Tünay Baykara	Social Democracy Group	25 January 1984 - 21 January 1985
Tünay Baykara	Independent	21 January 1985 - 8 July 1985
Mehmet Bayram	National Unity Party	6 December 1983 - 8 July 1985
Kaya Bekiroğlu	Independent	6 December 1983 - 22 December 1983
Kaya Bekiroğlu	Independent Solidarity Group	22 December 1983 - 8 July 1985
Aytaç Beşeşler	Independent	6 December 1983 - 8 February 1984
Aytaç Beşeşler	New Dawn Party	8 February 1984 - 8 July 1985
Orhan Zihni Bilgehan	National Unity Party	6 December 1983 - 8 July 1985
Ali Bilgi	Independent	6 December 1983 - 22 December 1983
Ali Bilgi	Independent Solidarity Group	22 December 1983 - 8 July 1985
Yılmaz Bora	Independent	6 December 1983 - 22 December 1983
Yılmaz Bora	Independent Solidarity Group	22 December 1983 - 25 January 1984
Yılmaz Bora	Social Democracy Group	25 January 1984 - 8 July 1985
Nazif Borman	National Unity Party	6 December 1983 - 8 July 1985
İsmail Bozkurt	Communal Liberation Party	6 December 1983 - 8 July 1985

=== C ===
Member of Parliament	Affiliation	Term
Mehmet Can	Independent	6 December 1983 - 22 December 1983
Mehmet Can	Independent Solidarity Group	22 December 1983 - 8 July 1985
Hüseyin Celâl	Republican Turkish Party	6 December 1983 - 8 July 1985
Mehmet Civa	Republican Turkish Party	6 December 1983 - 8 July 1985
Salih Coşar	National Unity Party	6 December 1983 - 8 July 1985
Hüseyin Curcioğlu	Independent	6 December 1983 - 22 December 1983
Hüseyin Curcioğlu	Independent Solidarity Group	22 December 1983 - 8 July 1985

=== Ç ===
Member of Parliament	Affiliation	Term
Mustafa Çağatay	National Unity Party	6 December 1983 - 8 July 1985
Fadıl Çağda	Republican Turkish Party	6 December 1983 - 8 July 1985

=== D ===
Member of Parliament	Affiliation	Term
Raif Denktaş	Social Democrat Party	6 December 1983 - 25 January 1984
Raif Denktaş	Social Democracy Group	25 January 1984 - 1 February 1984
Raif Denktaş	Social Democrat Party	1 February 1984 - 8 July 1985
Arif Hasan Tahsin Desem	Independent	6 December 1983 - 8 July 1985
Alpay Durduran	Communal Liberation Party	6 December 1983 - 8 July 1985

=== E ===
Member of Parliament	Affiliation	Term
Enver Emin	National Unity Party	6 December 1983 - 8 July 1985
Derviş Eroğlu	National Unity Party	6 December 1983 - 8 July 1985
Necati Ertekün	Independent	6 December 1983 - 22 December 1983
Necati Ertekün	Independent Solidarity Group	22 December 1983 - 8 July 1985

=== F ===
Member of Parliament	Affiliation	Term
Oktay Feridun	Independent	6 December 1983 - 22 December 1983
Oktay Feridun	Independent Solidarity Group	22 December 1983 - 26 March 1985
Oktay Feridun	Independent	26 March 1985 - 8 July 1985

=== G ===
Member of Parliament	Affiliation	Term
Güner Göktuğ	Independent	6 December 1983 - 22 December 1983
Güner Göktuğ	Independent Solidarity Group	22 December 1983 - 8 July 1985
Hüseyin Gültekin	Independent	6 December 1983 - 22 December 1983
Hüseyin Gültekin	Independent Solidarity Group	22 December 1983 - 8 July 1985

=== H ===
Member of Parliament	Affiliation	Term
Mustafa Hacıahmetoğlu	National Unity Party	6 December 1983 - 8 July 1985
Gözel Halim	Communal Liberation Party	6 December 1983 - 8 July 1985

=== K ===
Member of Parliament	Affiliation	Term
Orhan Kahya	Independent	6 December 1983 - 22 December 1983
Orhan Kahya	Independent Solidarity Group	22 December 1983 - 8 July 1985
Mustafa Karpaslı	National Unity Party	6 December 1983 - 8 July 1985
Nejat Konuk	Independent	6 December 1983 - 8 July 1985
İbrahim Koreli	Communal Liberation Party	6 December 1983 - 8 July 1985
Oğuz Ramadan Korhan	National Unity Party	6 December 1983 - 8 July 1985
İrsen Küçük	National Unity Party	6 December 1983 - 1 June 1984
İrsen Küçük	Independent	1 June 1984 - 12 July 1984
İrsen Küçük	Communal Progress Party	12 July 1984 - 8 July 1985
İsmet Kotak	Democratic People's Party	6 December 1983 - 25 January 1984
İsmet Kotak	Social Democracy Group	25 January 1984 - 1 February 1984
İsmet Kotak	Democratic People's Party	1 February 1984 - 8 July 1985

=== L ===
Member of Parliament	Affiliation	Term
Numan Ali Levent	Independent	6 December 1983 - 22 December 1983
Numan Ali Levent	Independent Solidarity Group	22 December 1983 - 8 July 1985

=== O ===
Member of Parliament	Affiliation	Term
Ata Öncel Onar	Independent	6 December 1983 - 8 July 1985

=== Ö ===
Member of Parliament	Affiliation	Term
Osman Örek	Independent	6 December 1983 - 8 July 1985
Ahmet Ötüken	Independent	6 December 1983 - 22 December 1983
Ahmet Ötüken	Independent Solidarity Group	22 December 1983 - 25 January 1984
Ahmet Ötüken	Social Democracy Group	25 January 1984 - 8 July 1985
Hasan Özbaflı	Party of Working People	6 December 1983 - 31 December 1984
Hasan Özbaflı	Cyprus Democracy Party	31 December 1984 - 8 July 1985
Özker Özgür	Republican Turkish Party	6 December 1983 - 8 July 1985
Lütfi Özter	Independent	6 December 1983 - 22 December 1983
Lütfi Özter	Independent Solidarity Group	22 December 1983 - 25 January 1984
Lütfi Özter	Social Democracy Group	25 January 1984 - 8 July 1985
Özkul Özyiğit	Independent	6 December 1983 - 22 December 1983
Özkul Özyiğit	Independent Solidarity Group	22 December 1983 - 25 January 1984
Özkul Özyiğit	Social Democracy Group	25 January 1984 - 8 July 1985

=== P ===
Member of Parliament	Affiliation	Term
Halil M Paşa	Independent	6 December 1983 - 22 December 1983
Halil M Paşa	Independent Solidarity Group	22 December 1983 - 8 July 1985
Olgun Paşalar	National Unity Party	6 December 1983 - 8 July 1985

=== R ===
Member of Parliament	Affiliation	Term
Yüksel Ratip	Independent	6 December 1983 - 22 December 1983
Yüksel Ratip	Independent Solidarity Group	22 December 1983 - 23 May 1985
Yüksel Ratip	Communal Progress Party	23 May 1985 - 8 July 1985
Hilmi Refik	Independent	6 December 1983 - 22 December 1983
Hilmi Refik	Independent Solidarity Group	22 December 1983 - 19 February 1985
Hilmi Refik	Independent	19 February 1985 - 23 May 1985
Hilmi Refik	Communal Progress Party	23 May 1985 - 8 July 1985

=== S ===
Member of Parliament	Affiliation	Term
Eşber Serakıncı	National Unity Party	6 December 1983 - 8 July 1985
Erdal Süreç	Communal Liberation Party	6 December 1983 - 8 July 1985

=== Ş ===
Member of Parliament	Affiliation	Term
Ergün Orhan Şevket	Independent	6 December 1983 - 8 July 1985

=== T ===
Member of Parliament	Affiliation	Term
Özel Tahsin	National Unity Party	6 December 1983 - 8 July 1985
İsmail Tezer	Nationalist Turkish Party	6 December 1983 - 8 February 1984
İsmail Tezer	New Dawn Party	8 February 1984 - 11 February 1985
İsmail Tezer	Independent	11 February 1985 - 25 February 1985
İsmail Tezer	New Turkish Union Party	25 February 1985 - 8 July 1985
Sadi Togan	Independent	6 December 1983 - 22 December 1983
Sadi Togan	Independent Solidarity Group	22 December 1983 - 8 July 1985
Baki Topaloğlu	Turkish Union Party	6 December 1983 - 26 January 1984
Baki Topaloğlu	Independent	26 January 1984 - 22 February 1984
Baki Topaloğlu	New Dawn Party	8 February 1984 - 8 July 1985

=== U ===
Member of Parliament	Affiliation	Term
Ferhat Ulutaş	Independent	6 December 1983 - 8 February 1984
Ferhat Ulutaş	New Dawn Party	8 February 1984 - 14 May 1984
Ferhat Ulutaş	Independent	14 May 1984 - 8 July 1985
Ekrem Ural	Independent	6 December 1983 - 31 December 1984
Ekrem Ural	Cyprus Democracy Party	31 December 1984 - 8 July 1985
Naci Talat Usar	Republican Turkish Party	6 December 1983 - 8 July 1985

=== V ===
Member of Parliament	Affiliation	Term
Esat Varoğlu	Communal Liberation Party	6 December 1983 - 8 July 1985
Ergün Vehbi	Republican Turkish Party	6 December 1983 - 8 July 1985
Çetin Veziroğlu	Communal Liberation Party	6 December 1983 - 8 July 1985
Fuat Veziroğlu	Independent	6 December 1983 - 31 December 1984
Fuat Veziroğlu	Cyprus Democracy Party	31 December 1984 - 8 July 1985
Ali Volkan	Communal Liberation Party	6 December 1983 - 8 July 1985
