= Turkish settlers in Northern Cyprus =

Citizens of Turkey living in Cyprus since the 1974 Turkish invasion

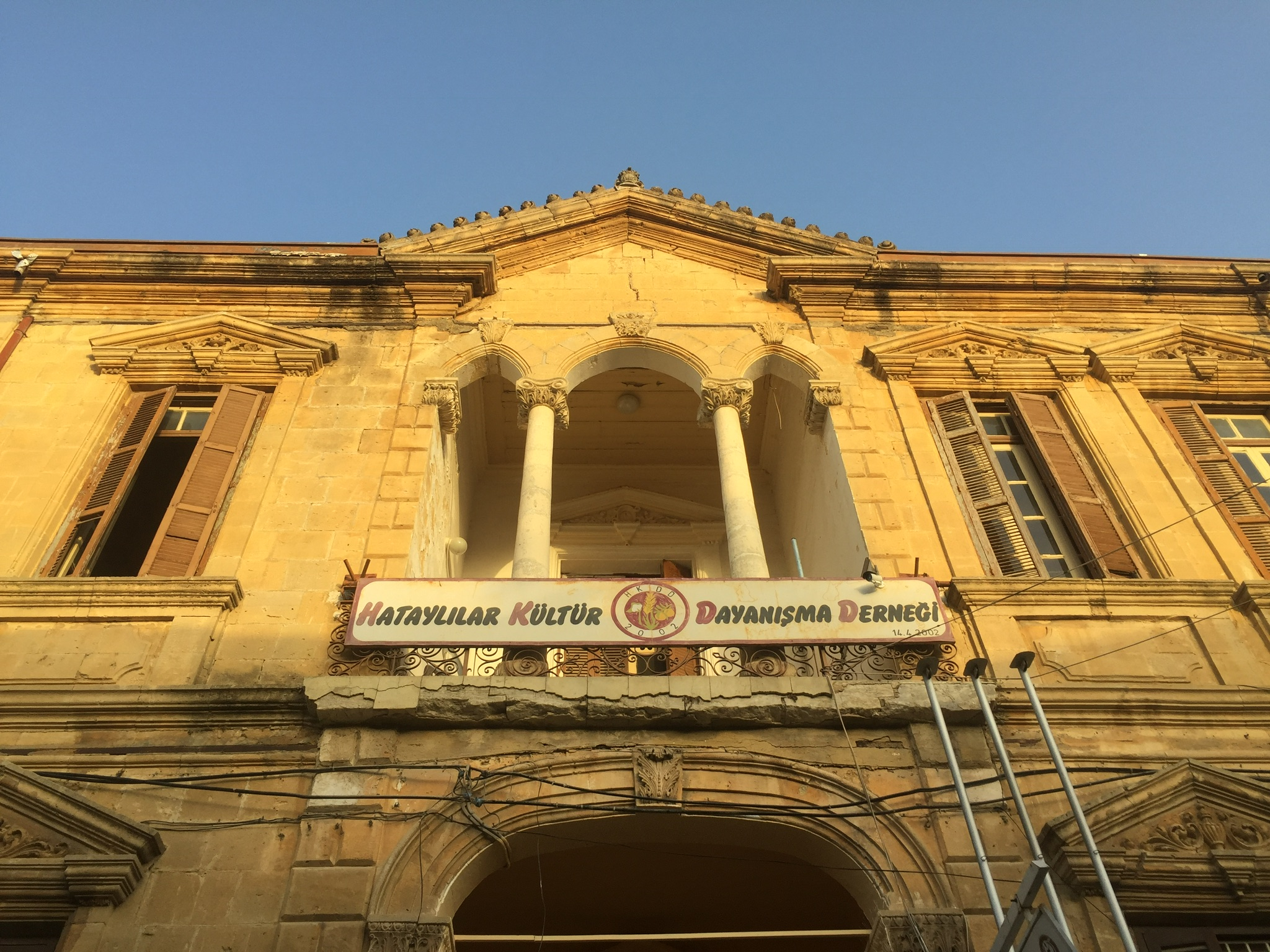
The headquarters of the Association for the Culture and Solidarity of those from Hatay, in Nicosia in 2017.

About half of the population of Northern Cyprus is made up of Turks who settled in Northern Cyprus after the Turkish invasion of Cyprus in 1974 and their descendants (not including Turkish soldiers). The vast majority of the Turkish settlers were given houses and land that legally belong to Greek Cypriots by the government of Northern Cyprus, which is solely recognised by Turkey. The group is heterogeneous in nature and is composed of various sub-groups, with varying degrees of integration. Mainland Turks are generally considered to be more conservative than the highly secularized Turkish Cypriots, and tend to be more in favor of a two-state Cyprus. However, not all settlers support nationalist policies.

The presence of settlers in the island is among the most controversial issues in the ongoing negotiations to reunify Cyprus. Their arrival is sometimes characterized as an example of settler colonialism. The position of the international community is that the settlement program is illegal under international law.

== History ==
=== Background ===
A concern with regards to the relatively small and dwindling population of Turkish Cypriots had existed amongst the Turkish Cypriot leadership before the 1974 invasion. Turkish Cypriots migrated from the island throughout the British rule, some moving to Turkey due to the active encouragement of the newly established Republic of Turkey in the 1920s, some fleeing economic difficulties and conflict to other countries in the subsequent decades. In 1967, Rauf Denktaş had noted that there was a need to encourage the Turkish Cypriots now living in Turkey to return to Cyprus, so as to maintain the "balance of the population".

The Turkish state had previously carried out mass population transfers, most notably during the population exchange with Greece in the 1920s and the deportations of Kurds in the 1930s. In the 1970s, Turkey had been experiencing increasing political violence and economic difficulties, exacerbated by high unemployment and an influx into the cities. In particular, there was diminished demand for agricultural labour due to increasing mechanisation, which would contrast with the sudden high demand for an agriculture workforce in Cyprus in 1974.

=== Depopulation of the north and early attempts to resettle ===
The conflict in 1974 caused a significant displacement of Cypriot population. Greek Cypriots fled from the north to the south, and Turkish Cypriots fled in the opposite direction during the conflict. A number of people from both communities did remain on the other side of the divide, but the vast majority of these ended up moving forcibly or voluntarily, particularly after the Third Vienna Agreement signed in August 1975. This population movement resulted in the depopulation of the northern part of the island. There are no reliable censuses conducted in the immediate aftermath of the war, but according to one estimate, the population of the north decreased from 234,000 to 70,000, of which 20,000 were Greek Cypriots still remaining in the area. Eventually, by the end of 1975, an estimated 180,000 Greek Cypriots had moved to the south and 60,000 Turkish Cypriots had moved to the north, resulting in a population deficit of 120,000. In particular, the Karpass Peninsula had become almost entirely depopulated.

This depopulation resulted in an emptying of houses and entire communities, and a vast amount of farmland and orchards were abandoned. Most acutely, there were 125,000 dönüms of citrus orchards in the north, most left behind by the Greek Cypriots, that would give produce in the autumn of 1974. As a stopgap measure, the Turkish government announced on 9 September 1974 that 5,000 seasonal workers would be sent from Turkey to help with the harvest. These workers were sent in from citrus-producing regions of Turkey such as Antalya and Mersin, and around half returned to Turkey at the end of the agricultural season.

In the meantime, the Turkish Cypriot authorities launched a largely unsuccessful campaign to persuade Turkish Cypriots abroad to return to their homeland. İsmet Kotak, the Minister for Public Works and Resettlement, was tasked with managing the campaign. He organised ads in Turkish newspapers with invitations to Turkish Cypriots in Turkey, and travelled to Turkey in 1975 to personally launch a plea on Turkish television. There was very limited response to this as many Turkish Cypriots had already fully settled and integrated in Turkey. Turkish Cypriots in the UK and Australia were also targeted, but only around 600–700 families ended up resettling from the UK.

According to Hatay, the first group of such settlers arrived on the island in February 1975; heavy settlement continued until 1977. These farmers originated from various regions of Turkey, including the Black Sea Region (Trabzon, Çarşamba, Samsun), the Mediterranean Region (Antalya, Adana, Mersin) and the Central Anatolia Region (Konya). In February 1975, the number of "workers" from Turkey in the island was 910.

=== Agricultural Workforce Agreement and organised settlement ===
The policy of settling farmers was conducted along the lines of the Agricultural Workforce Agreement signed by the Turkish Federated State of Cyprus (TFSC) and Turkey in 1975. The agreement was strongly supported by the administration of Rauf Denktaş. For instance, during its ratification process in the Turkish Cypriot Assembly, Raşit Ahmet Raşit, an MP, pleaded that the population transfer should not be rushed as there were cultural differences between Turkey and Cyprus, to which Denktaş had retorted "We need a population of 200,000 as soon as possible!". The consulates of the TFSC in Turkey were actively involved in organizing the transfer of this population; announcements through the radio and muhtars in villages called upon farmers interested in moving to Cyprus to apply to the consulates. Many farmers who moved to Cyprus were from parts of Turkey with harsh living conditions or had to be displaced. This was the case with the village of Kayalar, where people from the Turkish Black Sea district of Çarşamba were moved. These people were displaced due to the flooding of their village by a dam that was built, and were given a choice between moving to Cyprus and other regions in Turkey; some chose Cyprus. Christos Ioannides argued that these people had no political motivations for this choice; interviews with some have indicated that some did not know the location of Cyprus before moving there.

After the applications of the prospective settlers were approved, they were transported to the port of Mersin in buses specially arranged by the state. They exited Turkey using passports, one of which were issued for every family, and then took the ferry to cross the Mediterranean Sea to Cyprus. Once they arrived in Famagusta, they were initially accommodated briefly in empty hostels or schools, and then transferred to the Greek Cypriot villages, which were their destinations of settlement. The families were assigned houses by lot.

The paperwork of these settlers were initially done in a way that would make them appear to be Turkish Cypriots returning to their homeland, to prevent accusations of violation of the Geneva Convention. Once the settlers arrived, Turkish Cypriot officers gathered them in the village coffeehouse, collected their personal information, and the settlers were assigned the closest Turkish Cypriot-inhabited village to their place of residence as their place of birth in their special identity cards that were subsequently produced. For example, a number of settlers in the Karpass Peninsula had the Turkish Cypriot village of Mehmetçik as their place of birth. When asked about the policy of settlement, İsmet Kotak, the Minister of Labor, Rehabilitation and Social Works of the TFSC, said that what was happening was an intense, rightful and legal return of Turkish Cypriots that had been forcefully driven out of the island. However, these special identity cards did not prove effective in achieving their mission and TFSC identity cards showing the settlers' actual place of birth were issued.

== Demographics ==
=== Sub-groups ===
Mainland Turks in Northern Cyprus are divided into two main groups: citizens and non-citizen residents. Within the citizens, some have arrived in the island as a part of a settlement policy run by the Turkish and Turkish Cypriot authorities, some have migrated on their own and some have been born in the island to parents of either groups. Mete Hatay argues that only the first group has "good reason to be called settlers".

The aforementioned sub-groups consist of several categories. The first group, citizens, can further be differentiated into skilled laborers and white-collar workers, Turkish soldiers and their close families, farmers who have settled in Cyprus and individual migrants. The non-citizens can be divided into students and academic staff, tourists, workers with permits and illegitimate workers lacking permits. Farmers settled from Turkey between 1975 and 1977 constitute the majority of the settler population.

Among the approximately 10,000 mainland Turks who settled in Northern Cyprus in 1975, there were also 8,000 Turkish Roma.

=== "War of numbers" ===
The third official census of Northern Cyprus was carried out in 2011, made under the auspices of UN observers. It returned a total population of 294,906. These results were disputed by some political parties, labour unions and local newspapers. The government was accused of deliberately under-counting the population in the census, after apparently giving an estimate of 700,000 before the census, in order to demand financial help from Turkey. One source claims that the population in the north has reached 500,000, split between 50% Turkish Cypriots and 50% Turkish settlers or Cypriot-born children of such settlers. Researcher Mete Hatay has written that such reports are "wildly speculative" and are picked up by opposition parties for political benefit, which resulted in reports in the south. Such reports have never been scientifically or statistically scrutinised, despite opportunities of opposition parties to do so using the electoral rolls in their possession, thereby continuing a "war of numbers".

== Politics ==
=== Political representation ===
Despite the prevalent assumption that settlers helped maintain the right-wing National Unity Party's (UBP) decades-long power and consecutive electoral victories, this is incorrect, as between 1976 and 1993, the UBP received more votes in native than in settler villages. These trends were determined by the analysis of votes across several native and settler villages by the political scientist Mete Hatay. There was a political movement that was based on the representation of what they saw as the settlers' interests; this line of politics included the New Dawn Party (YDP) and Turkish Union Party (TBP). The majority of the vote in settler villages were divided between these settler parties and mainstream Turkish Cypriot opposition, including the Communal Liberation Party (TKP) and the Republican Turkish Party (CTP). Between 1992, when it was founded, and the election of 2003, which represented a shift away from it, the Democratic Party (DP) received the majority of settler opposition votes. Meanwhile, between 1990 and 2003, the UBP maintained a vote share averaging at around 40% at settler villages, but this was still less than the support it received in rural areas inhabited by native Turkish Cypriots. The UBP only received more support in settler villages in 1993 and after 2003, when it lost power. Furthermore, despite the prevalent assumption that the settlers advance the political interests of Turkey, settlers have voted against the line backed by Turkey at times, notably in 1990 against the Turkey-backed UBP and Rauf Denktaş and in 2004 against the Annan Plan for Cyprus.

=== Legal issues ===
The presence of settlers in the island is one of the thorniest, most controversial issues in the ongoing negotiations to reunify Cyprus. Their arrival from 1974 onwards, a process encouraged by both Turkey and the Turkish-Cypriot authorities of the time, is seen by some as a contemporary example of settler colonialism. The position of the internationally recognised, Greek Cypriot-led Republic of Cyprus and Greece, backed by United Nations resolutions, is that the settlement program is completely illegal under international law, as it violates the Fourth Geneva Convention (which prohibits an occupying power from willfully transferring its own population to the occupied area) and is a war crime. The Republic of Cyprus and Greece thus demand that settlers be made to return to Turkey in a possible future solution to the Cyprus dispute; one of the main reasons that Greek Cypriots overwhelmingly rejected the 2004 Annan Plan was that the Annan plan allowed settlers to remain in Cyprus, and even allowed them to vote in the referendum for the proposed solution. Both the Republic of Cyprus and Greece have therefore demanded that a future Cyprus settlement include the removal of settlers, or at least the greater part of them.

Many settlers have severed their ties to Turkey, and their children consider Cyprus to be their homeland. There have been cases where settlers and their children returning to Turkey faced ostracism in their communities of origin. Thus, according to the Encyclopedia of Human Rights, many others argue that the settlers cannot be forcefully expelled from the island; in addition, and most observers think that a comprehensive future Cyprus settlement must "balance the overall legality of the settlement program with the human rights of the settlers".

=== Settler colonialism ===
Several scholars have characterized Turkey's policies in northern Cyprus since 1974 as a form of settler colonialism, arguing that the displacement of Greek Cypriots was followed by state-directed population transfers, demographic restructuring, and separate state-building intended to consolidate Turkish control over the territory.

Historian Helge Jensehaugen estimates that 30,000–45,000 settlers arrived from Turkey between 1974 and 1980, describing their relocation and the distribution of land, housing, and resources as "organized, state-controlled demographic engineering". Moudouros argues that Turkish government directives formalized the permanent settlement of migrants from Anatolia, allocating them property previously belonging to displaced Greek Cypriots.

In 2003, the Parliamentary Assembly of the Council of Europe attributed northern Cyprus's demographic transformation to deliberate Turkish and Turkish Cypriot policies, condemned the settlers' presence as "a process of hidden colonisation", and called upon Turkey to halt the settlement process.

The European Court of Human Rights established in Cyprus v. Turkey (2001) that Turkey exercised "effective overall control" over northern Cyprus and bore responsibility under the European Convention on Human Rights for actions of its Turkish Cypriot administration.

== Bibliography ==
- Hatay, Mete (2005), Beyond Numbers: An Inquiry into the Political Integration of the Turkish 'Settlers' in Northern Cyprus (PDF), PRIO Cyprus Center, archived from the original (PDF) on 4 March 2016
- Hatay, Mete (2008), "The Problem of Pigeons: Orientalism, Xenophobia and a Rhetoric of the "Local" in North Cyprus" (PDF), The Cyprus Review, 20 (2): 145–172, archived from the original (PDF) on 2015-07-25
- Jensehaugen, Helge (2014), "The Northern Cypriot Dream – Turkish Immigration 1974–1980" (PDF), The Cyprus Review, 26 (2): 57–83
- Jensehaugen, Helge (2017-07-03). "'Filling the void': Turkish settlement in Northern Cyprus, 1974–1980". Settler Colonial Studies. 7 (3): 354–371. doi:10.1080/2201473X.2016.1196031. ISSN 2201-473X. S2CID 132010152.
- Keser, Ulvi; Biber, Fatih Uğur (2020). İş, Emek, Göç: Kıbrıs 1974 (in Turkish). Istanbul: Hiperyayın. ISBN 978-605-281-720-9.
- Kurtuluş, Hatice; Purkıs, Semra (2014), Kuzey Kıbrıs'ta Türkiyeli Göçmenler (in Turkish), Istanbul: Türkiye İş Bankası Kültür Yayınları
- Loizides, Neophytos (2011), "Contested migration and settler politics in Cyprus" (PDF), Political Geography, 30 (7): 391–401, doi:10.1016/j.polgeo.2011.08.004
- Şahin, İsmail; Şahin, Cemile; Öztürk, Mine (2013), "Barış Harekâtı Sonrasında Türkiye'den Kıbrıs'a Yapılan Göçler ve Tatbik Edilen İskân Politikası" (PDF), Turkish Studies (in Turkish), 8 (7): 599–630, doi:10.7827/TurkishStudies.5225
- Talat Zrilli, Aysenur (2019), "Ethno-nationalism, state building and migration: the first wave of migration from Turkey to North Cyprus", Southeast European and Black Sea Studies, 19 (3): 493–510, https://doi.org/10.1080/14683857.2019.1644047
