= List of prime ministers of Northern Cyprus =

This is a chronological list of every government formed by the prime ministers of Northern Cyprus.

== List of officeholders ==
№	Portrait	Name (Birth–Death)	Term of office	
№	Portrait	Name (Birth–Death)	Inaugurated	Left office
1		Fazıl Küçük (1906–1984)	16 August 1960	18 February 1973
2		Rauf Denktaş (1924–2012)	15 February 1973	15 July 1974 (deposed)

=== Prime ministers of the Turkish Federated State of Cyprus (1975–1983) ===
This list gives all prime ministers after the founding of the Turkish Federated State of Cyprus, which was intended as an autonomous part of Cyprus, but was rejected by the government of the Republic of Cyprus.

No.	Portrait	Name (Birth–Death)	Term of office			Political party
No.	Portrait	Name (Birth–Death)	Took office	Left office	Duration	Political party
1		Rauf Denktaş (1924–2012)	15 July 1974	3 July 1976	1 year, 141 days	National Unity Party
2		Nejat Konuk (1928–2014)	3 July 1976	21 April 1978	1 year, 292 days	National Unity Party
3		Osman Örek (1925–1999)	21 April 1978	12 December 1978	235 days	National Unity Party
4		Mustafa Çağatay (1937–1989)	12 December 1978	15 November 1983	4 years, 338 days	National Unity Party

=== Prime ministers of the Turkish Republic of Northern Cyprus (1983–present) ===
This list gives all prime ministers after Northern Cyprus' unilateral declaration of independence in 1983, which followed after the refusal of the government of the Republic of Cyprus to recognize the Turkish Federated State of Cyprus.

No.	Portrait	Name (Birth–Death)	Term of office			Political party
No.	Portrait	Name (Birth–Death)	Took office	Left office	Duration	Political party
1		Mustafa Çağatay (1937–1989)	15 November 1983	13 December 1983	28 days	National Unity Party
2		Nejat Konuk (1928–2014)	13 December 1983	19 July 1985	1 year, 218 days	National Unity Party
3		Derviş Eroğlu (born 1938)	19 July 1985	1 January 1994	8 years, 166 days	National Unity Party
4		Hakkı Atun (born 1935)	1 January 1994	16 August 1996	2 years, 228 days	Democratic Party
(3)		Derviş Eroğlu (born 1938)	16 August 1996	13 January 2004	7 years, 150 days	National Unity Party
5		Mehmet Ali Talat (born 1952)	13 January 2004	23 April 2005	1 year, 100 days	Republican Turkish Party
—		Serdar Denktaş (born 1959); Acting Prime Minister	23 April 2005	26 April 2005	3 days	Democratic Party
6		Ferdi Sabit Soyer (born 1952)	26 April 2005	5 May 2009	4 years, 9 days	Republican Turkish Party
(3)		Derviş Eroğlu (born 1938)	5 May 2009	23 April 2010	353 days	National Unity Party
—		Hüseyin Özgürgün (born 1965); Acting Prime Minister	23 April 2010	17 May 2010	24 days	National Unity Party
7		İrsen Küçük (1940–2019)	17 May 2010	13 June 2013	3 years, 27 days	National Unity Party
8		Sibel Siber (born 1960)	13 June 2013	2 September 2013	81 days	Republican Turkish Party
9		Özkan Yorgancıoğlu (born 1954)	2 September 2013	16 July 2015	1 year, 317 days	Republican Turkish Party
10		Ömer Kalyoncu (born 1950)	16 July 2015	16 April 2016	275 days	Republican Turkish Party
11		Hüseyin Özgürgün (born 1965)	16 April 2016	2 February 2018	1 year, 292 days	National Unity Party
12		Tufan Erhürman (born 1970)	2 February 2018	22 May 2019	1 year, 109 days	Republican Turkish Party
13		Ersin Tatar (born 1960)	22 May 2019	23 October 2020	1 year, 154 days	National Unity Party
14		Ersan Saner (born 1966)	9 December 2020	5 November 2021	331 days	National Unity Party
15		Faiz Sucuoğlu (born 1961)	5 November 2021	12 May 2022	188 days	National Unity Party
16		Ünal Üstel (born 1955)	12 May 2022	Incumbent	4 years, 160 days	National Unity Party

== See also ==
- Prime Minister of Northern Cyprus
