= 1990 Northern Cypriot presidential election =

← 1985	22 April 1990	1995 →
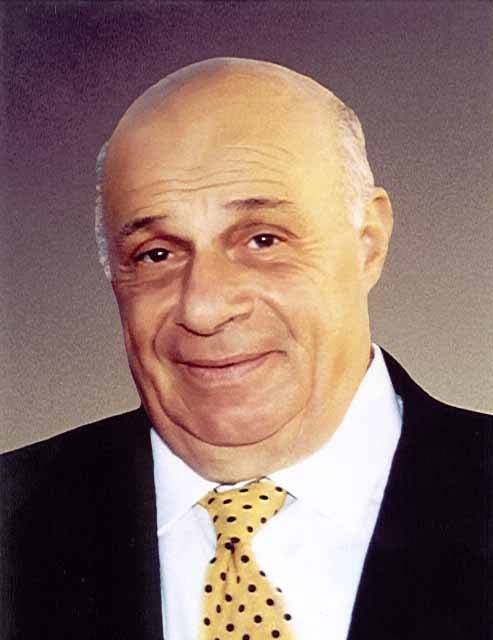

Nominee	Rauf Denktaş	İsmail Bozkurt
Party	Independent	Independent
Popular vote	61,404	29,568
Percentage	66.65%	32.09%
President before election
Hakkı Atun (acting)
National Unity Party
Elected President
Rauf Denktaş
Independent

Presidential elections were held in Northern Cyprus on 22 April 1990. Rauf Denktaş of the National Unity Party was re-elected with around two-thirds of the vote.

== Results ==
Candidate	Party	Votes	%
Rauf Denktaş	Independent	61,404	66.65
İsmail Bozkurt	Independent	29,568	32.09
Alpay Durduran	New Cyprus Party	1,157	1.26
Total		92,129	100.00
Valid votes		92,129	97.42
Invalid/blank votes		2,443	2.58
Total votes		94,572	100.00
Registered voters/turnout		101,172	93.48
Source: YSK
