= 2000 Northern Cypriot presidential election =

← 1995	15 April 2000	2005 →
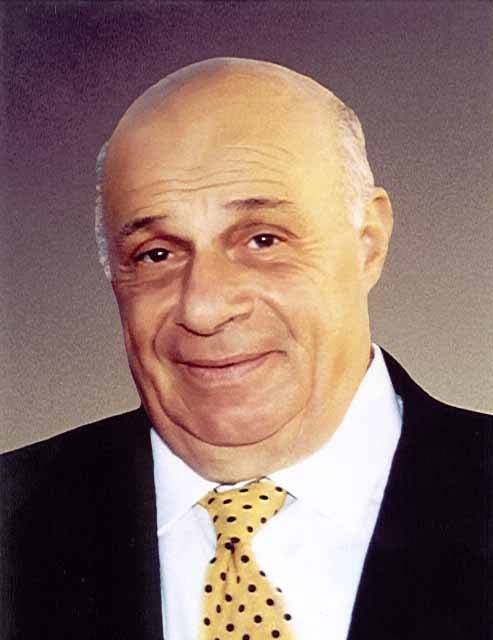

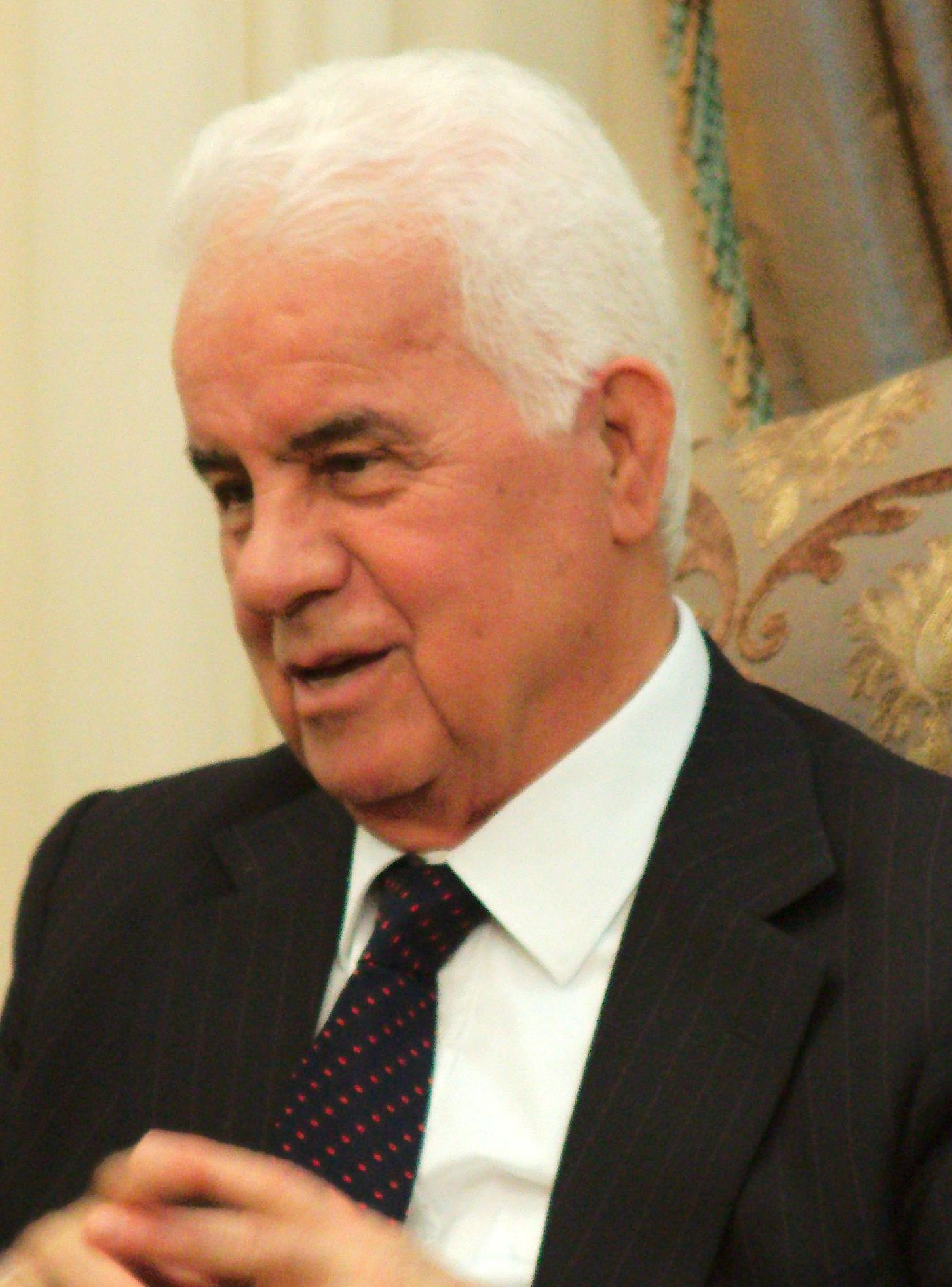

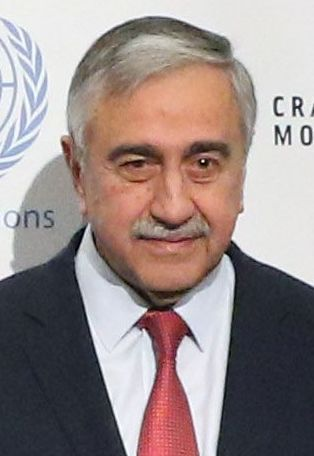

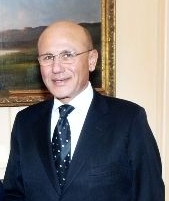
Nominee	Rauf Denktaş	Derviş Eroğlu
Party	Independent	UBP
Popular vote	42,820	29,555
Percentage	43.67%	30.14%
Nominee	Mustafa Akıncı	Mehmet Ali Talat
Party	TKP	CTP
Popular vote	11,469	9,834
Percentage	11.70%	10.03%
President before election
Rauf Denktaş
Independent
Elected President
Rauf Denktaş
Independent

Presidential elections were held in Northern Cyprus on 15 April 2000. Incumbent president Rauf Denktaş was the lead candidate in the first round, but failed to cross the 50% threshold to win outright. However, the second-placed candidate Derviş Eroğlu forfeited the election and the second round was not held.

== Results ==
Candidate	Party	Votes	%
Rauf Denktaş	Independent	42,820	43.67
Derviş Eroğlu	National Unity Party	29,555	30.14
Mustafa Akıncı	Communal Liberation Party	11,469	11.70
Mehmet Ali Talat	Republican Turkish Party	9,834	10.03
Arif Hasan Tahsin Desem	Patriotic Unity Movement	2,545	2.60
Şener Levent	Independent	899	0.92
Turgut Afsaroglu	Independent	553	0.56
Ayhan Kaymak	Independent	369	0.38
Total		98,044	100.00
Valid votes		98,044	95.53
Invalid/blank votes		4,592	4.47
Total votes		102,636	100.00
Registered voters/turnout		126,675	81.02
Source: YSK
