= Sibel Siber =

8th prime minister of Northern Cyprus

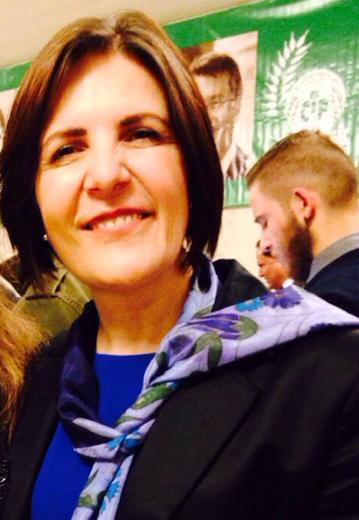
- Siber in 2014

Speaker of the Assembly of the Republic
- In office 4 September 2013 – 22 January 2018
- Preceded by: Hasan Bozer
- Succeeded by: Teberrüken Uluçay

10th Prime Minister of Northern Cyprus
- In office 13 June 2013 – 2 September 2013
- President: Derviş Eroğlu
- Preceded by: İrsen Küçük
- Succeeded by: Özkan Yorgancıoğlu

Personal details
- Born: 13 December 1960 (age 65) Nicosia, Cyprus
- Party: Republican Turkish Party
- Spouse: Rıfat Siber (m. 1984)
- Children: 1
- Education: Istanbul University

Sibel Siber (born 13 December 1960) is a Turkish Cypriot politician. She served as the Prime Minister of Northern Cyprus between 13 June 2013, following the fall of the government of İrsen Küçük in a vote of no confidence, and 2 September 2013. She was the first woman to occupy this post. As of November 2015, Siber was the Speaker of Parliament, the Assembly of the Republic of Northern Cyprus. She was the second woman to occupy this post, after Fatma Ekenoğlu.

== Early life ==
Sibel Siber (née Adademir) was born in Nicosia on 13 December 1960. Her father, Altay Adademir, was a primary school teacher from the village of Melouseia in the Larnaca District; her mother, Aysel Adademir, was a housewife from the village of Klavdia. She has one sibling. She continually moved to different villages and cities in her childhood as her father was appointed to different schools. She lived respectively in Larnaca, Arsos and Klavdia, and moved to Tremetousia when she was seven. She would later recount her primary fear during childhood as travel, as many Turkish Cypriots went missing while on the roads, but highlight the peaceful interaction between the two communities in the mixed village of Tremetousia. She graduated from the Tremetousia Turkish Primary School and enrolled to the Nicosia Turkish Girls' High School.

Siber was admitted to the Cerrahpaşa Faculty of Medicine of Istanbul University when she was 16, at a time when political incidents involving students were at their height. She completed the medical school and graduated as a physician on 5 April 1983. She completed her specialization in internal medicine in the Şişli Etfal Hospital in 1987, returned to Cyprus and started working at her private clinic. In 1989, she obtained a scholarship and was trained in diabetes and endocrinology at the University of Virginia.

Her first published article, a critic of the healthcare system in Northern Cyprus, was published in 1983 in the newspaper with the highest circulation at the time.

== 2015 TRNC presidential campaign ==
Siber promised a program that if she were elected, would ensure the reconciliation of Cyprus dispute. She saw the role of president as an important figure in order to solve communal problems. She also referred to her previous term as the prime minister, claiming that she would pursue the same policy of openness, transparency and trust that she did during her term as prime minister. She applied her candidacy to the High Election Committee on 13 March, and was declared as the official candidate for the Republican Turkish Party (CTP) on 23 March. In March, an opinion poll took place, as a result 21.1% of the voters said that they will vote for her.

Prominent members of the CTP, such as Prime Minister Özkan Yorgancıoğlu, former president Mehmet Ali Talat and former prime minister Ferdi Sabit Soyer, gave their support for Siber as the candidate of the party. They were all very positive that Siber will win the first round of the election.

On 19 April 2015, the first round of the election took place. She came in third out of seven candidates with 24,271 votes or 22.53% of total votes. The incumbent president, Derviş Eroğlu got the first place with 30,328 of the votes (28.15% of total votes), followed by former Deputy Prime Minister Mustafa Akıncı with 29,030 votes (26.94% of total votes). Siber was eliminated in the first round and Akıncı went on to win the election.

== Private life ==
She met her husband, Dr. Rıfat Siber, a urologist, while she was working as a volunteer in the Dr. Burhan Nalbantoğlu State Hospital after her graduation. The couple got married in 1984 and had their first child, their daughter Sümer in 1985.

Political offices
Preceded by İrsen Küçük	Prime Minister of Northern Cyprus; 2013	Succeeded by Özkan Yorgancıoğlu
Preceded by Hasan Bozer	Speaker of the Assembly; 2013–2018	Succeeded by Teberrüken Uluçay
