= 1985 Northern Cypriot presidential election =

← 1981	9 June 1985	1990 →
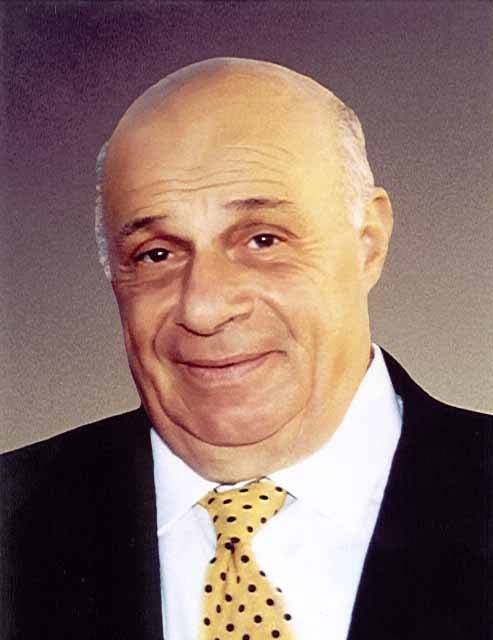

Nominee	Rauf Denktaş	Özker Özgür	Alpay Durduran
Party	Independent	CTP	TKP
Popular vote	55,349	14,412	7,520
Percentage	70.22%	18.28%	9.54%
President before election
Rauf Denktaş
UBP
Elected President
Rauf Denktaş
Independent

Presidential elections were held in Northern Cyprus on 9 June 1985. Rauf Denktaş of the National Unity Party was re-elected with over 70% of the vote.

== Results ==
Candidate	Party	Votes	%
Rauf Denktaş	Independent	55,349	70.22
Özker Özgür	Republican Turkish Party	14,412	18.28
Alpay Durduran	Communal Liberation Party	7,520	9.54
Arif Hasan Tahsin Desem	Independent	694	0.88
Servet Sami Dedeçay	Independent	514	0.65
Ayhan Kaymak	Independent	337	0.43
Total		78,826	100.00
Valid votes		78,826	97.52
Invalid/blank votes		2,002	2.48
Total votes		80,828	100.00
Registered voters/turnout		94,277	85.73
Source: YSK
