= Hakkı Atun =

Prime minister of Northern Cyprus

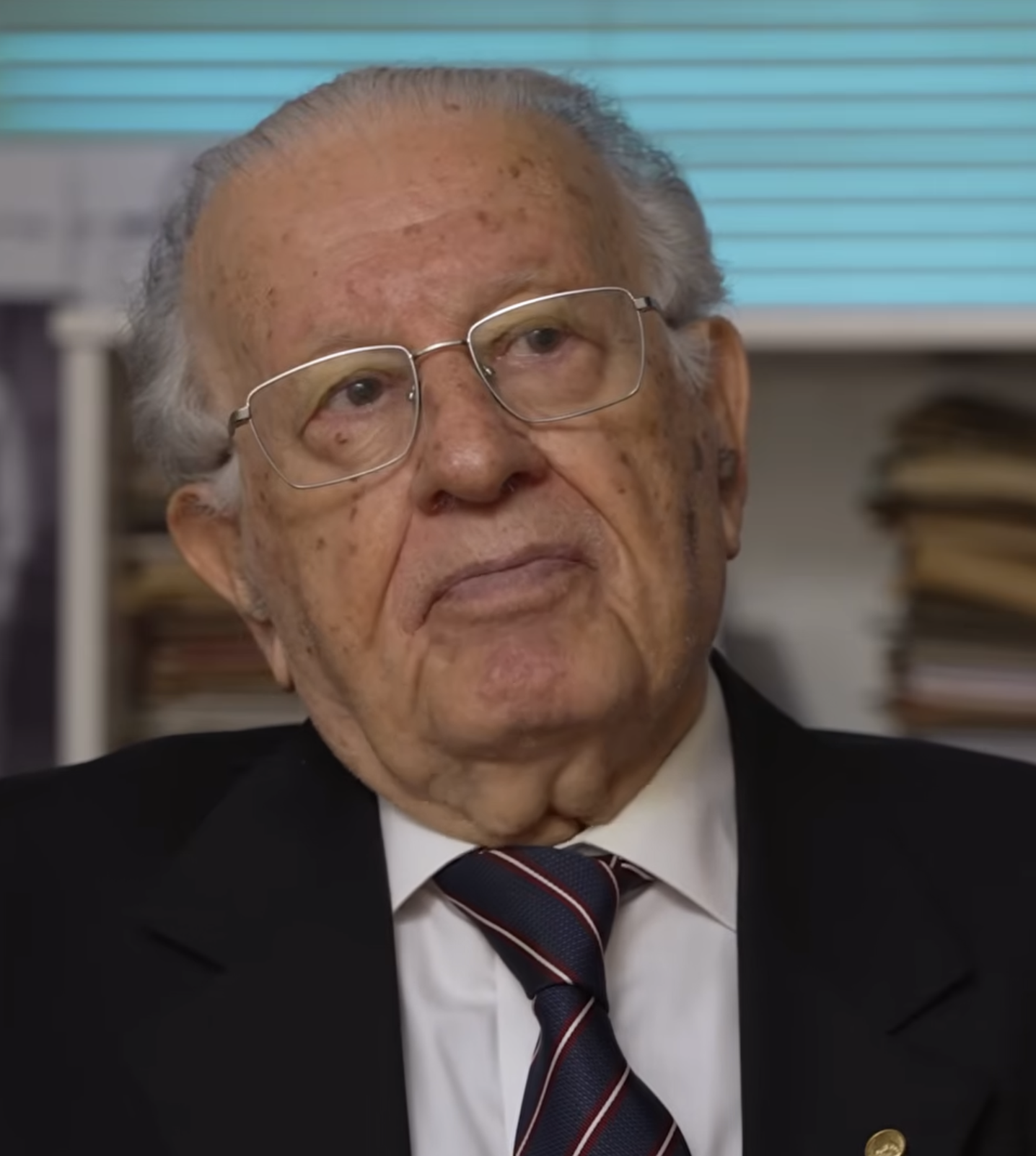

Speaker of the Assembly of the Republic
- In office 4 October 1996 – 18 December 1998
- Preceded by: Ayan Halit Acarkan
- Succeeded by: Ertugrul Hasipoğlu
- In office 17 July 1985 – 28 June 1993
- Preceded by: Oğuz Ramadan Korhan
- Succeeded by: Vehbi Zeki Serter

Prime Minister of Northern Cyprus
- In office 1 January 1994 – 16 August 1996
- President: Rauf Denktaş
- Preceded by: Derviş Eroğlu
- Succeeded by: Derviş Eroğlu

Acting President of Northern Cyprus
- In office 15 March 1990 – 25 April 1990
- Prime Minister: Derviş Eroğlu
- Preceded by: Rauf Denktaş
- Succeeded by: Rauf Denktaş

Leader of the Democratic Party
- In office 30 July 1992 – 16 August 1996
- Preceded by: Office established
- Succeeded by: Serdar Denktaş

Member of the Assembly of Republic
- In office 20 June 1976 – 6 December 1998
- Constituency: Lefkoşa (1976, 1981, 1985, 1990, 1993)

Personal details
- Born: 7 October 1935 (age 90)
- Party: Democratic Party; National Unity Party
- Education: Istanbul Technical University; The University of Manchester; University of Nottingham

Hakkı Atun (born 7 October 1935) is a former Prime Minister of the Turkish Republic of Northern Cyprus. He held this office between 1994 and 1996. He was born in Famagusta in 1935. In 1959, he graduated from Istanbul Technical University as an engineer architect. He studied urban planning at Manchester and Nottingham Universities. In 1961–1975, he held various public positions. In 1963, he became the Regional Director of Limassol-Paphos Planning, in 1967 became the Head of the Planning and Construction Department, and in 1975, the Undersecretary of Housing.

In the General Elections of 1976, 1981, 1985, 1990, he was elected as a Nicosia MP from the National Unity Party and served as the Minister of Settlement and Rehabilitation, the Ministry of Finance, the Ministry of National Education Culture, Youth and Sports and the Secretary General of the National Unity Party. In 1983, he became a member of the constituent assembly and served as the Minister of Settlement in the first Republican Government. From 1985 to 1993, he served as Speaker of the Assembly of the Republic.

In 1992, he was elected President of the Democratic Party, which was formed as a result of the Movement he led with 9 MPs within the National Unity Party . He was elected as a Member of Parliament from the Democratic Party in the 1993 General Elections and served as Prime Minister until 16 August 1996 in the Coalition Governments of the Democratic Party-Republican Turkish Party. On 4 October 1996, he was re-elected as the Speaker of the Assembly of the Republic.

Later, he did not take part in the parliament. He is the Honorary President of DP. He speaks English and a little Greek. He is married and has two children. He is the son of the aunt of the 3rd President of TRNC Derviş Eroğlu .

Political offices
Preceded by Derviş Eroğlu	Prime minister of the Turkish Republic of Northern Cyprus; 1994–1996	Succeeded by Derviş Eroğlu
