= 1995 Northern Cypriot presidential election =

← 1990	15 April 1995 (first round); 22 April 1995 (second round)	2000 →
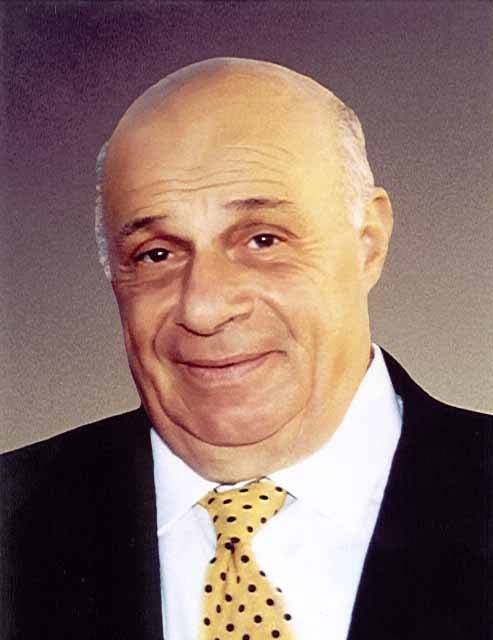

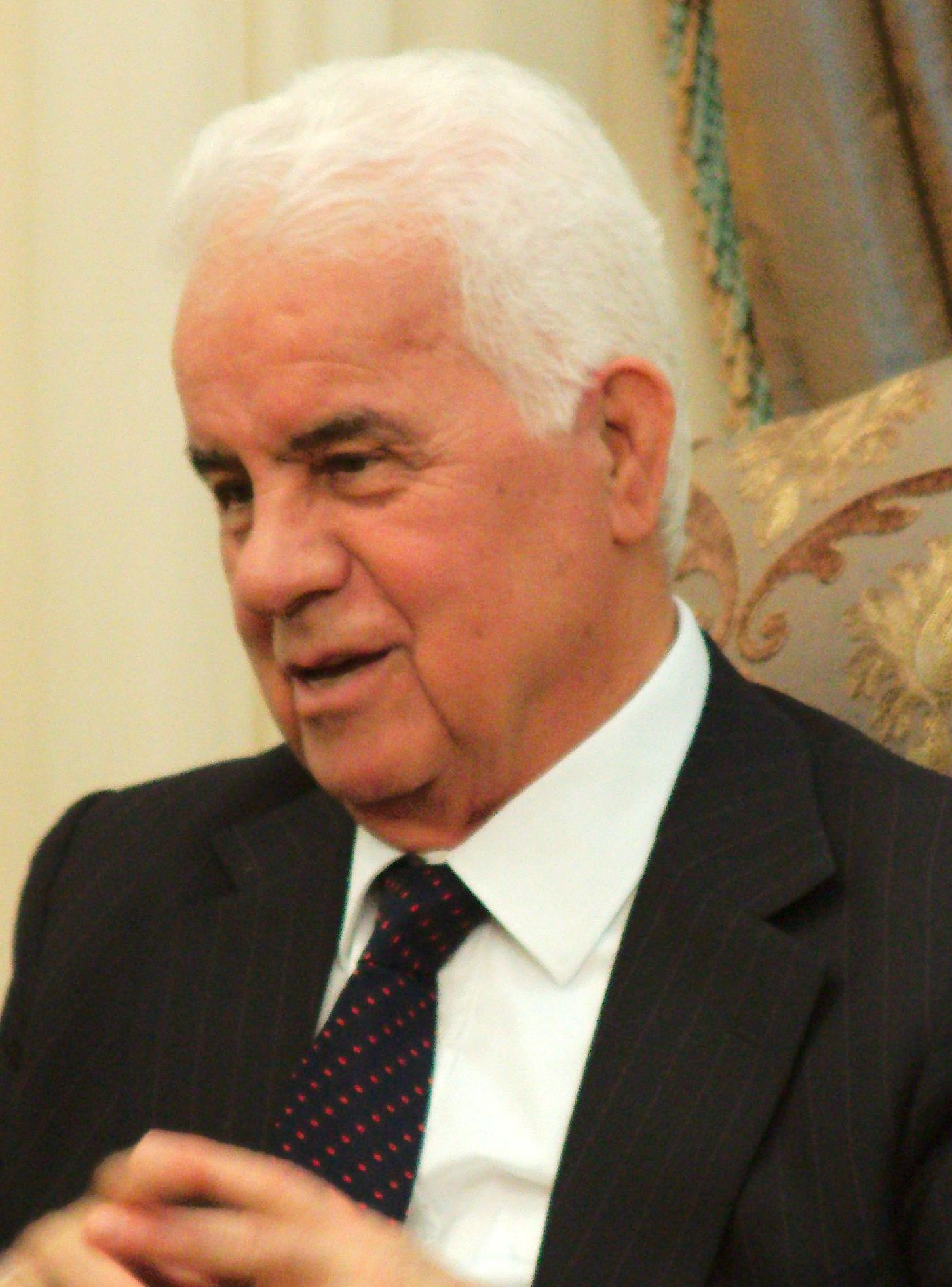
Candidate	Rauf Denktaş	Derviş Eroğlu
Party	Independent	UBP
Popular vote	53,235	31,972
Percentage	62.48%	37.52%
President before election
Rauf Denktaş
Independent
Elected President
Rauf Denktaş
Independent

Presidential elections were held in Northern Cyprus on 15 April 1995. As no candidate received over 50% of the vote, a run-off was held on 22 April. Rauf Denktaş was re-elected with 62% of the vote.

== Results ==
Candidate	Party	First round		Second round	
Candidate	Party	Votes	%	Votes	%
Rauf Denktaş	Independent	37,563	40.40	53,235	62.48
Derviş Eroğlu	National Unity Party	22,450	24.14	31,972	37.52
Özker Özgür	Republican Turkish Party	17,627	18.96		
Mustafa Akıncı	Peace and Democracy Movement	13,233	14.23		
Alpay Durduran	Patriot Union Party	1,628	1.75		
Ayhan Kaymak	Independent	349	0.38		
Sami Düdenoğlu	Independent	132	0.14		
Total		92,982	100.00	85,207	100.00
Valid votes		92,982	96.31	85,207	93.75
Invalid/blank votes		3,558	3.69	5,684	6.25
Total votes		96,540	100.00	90,891	100.00
Registered voters/turnout		113,398	85.13	113,440	80.12
Source: YSK, YSK
