= Raif Denktaş =

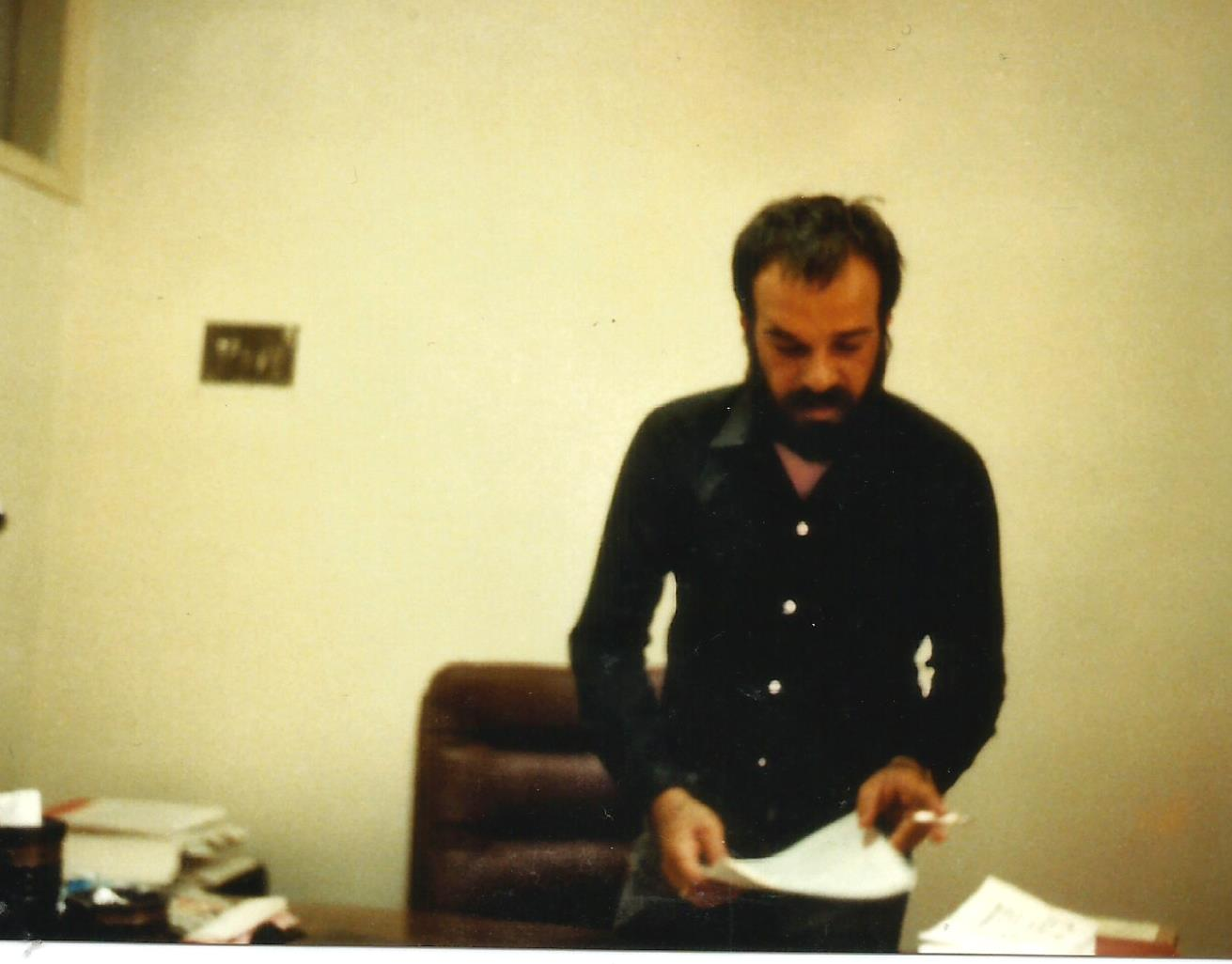

Member of Parliament for Northern Cyprus
- In office 6 December 1983 – 8 July 1985

Personal details
- Born: 26 January 1951 Nicosia, British Cyprus
- Died: 26 December 1985 (aged 34) Ankara, Turkey
- Political party: Social Democrat Party
- Spouse: Mesude Denktaş (m. 1973–1985)
- Parent(s): Rauf Denktaş and Aydın Denktaş
- Relatives: Serdar Denktaş (brother)
- Education: Middle East Technical University (BA); University of Oxford (MA)

Raif Denktaş (also known as Raif Rauf Denktaş) (26 January 1951 – 26 December 1985) was a Turkish Cypriot composer, politician, academic, journalist and writer. He was the bass player of the popular Cypriot folk band Sıla 4. He died after a controversial car accident where his car collided with a military vehicle.

== Early life ==
Raif Denktaş was born on 26 January 1951, in Nicosia to Aydın and Rauf Denktaş, the founder and the former President of the Turkish Republic of Northern Cyprus. He attended to the Köşklüçiftlik Primary School which was later renamed as Şehit Tuncer Primary School following the death of his primary school teacher during the 1963 intercommunal violence between Turkish and Greek Cypriots. Before graduating from Türk Maarif Koleji in 1969, he studied a part of his secondary education in TED Ankara College and in Kadıköy Maarif College during his father's exile in Turkey.

Denktaş fought during the 1963 incidents at the age of 12. He was also on military service for the 22nd Squad as a high school student from 1968 to 1969. He returned to his squad temporarily in 1974 after the coup d'état organised by the Greek Junta and stayed until the completion of the Turkish invasion of Cyprus.

== Academics ==
Raif Denktaş received his bachelor's degree in public administration from the Middle East Technical University, followed by a master's degree in political science from the University of Oxford. Denktaş received an offer from the latter institution to complete his PhD in sociology of politics in 1982, however he opted to return to Cyprus and pursue a political career.

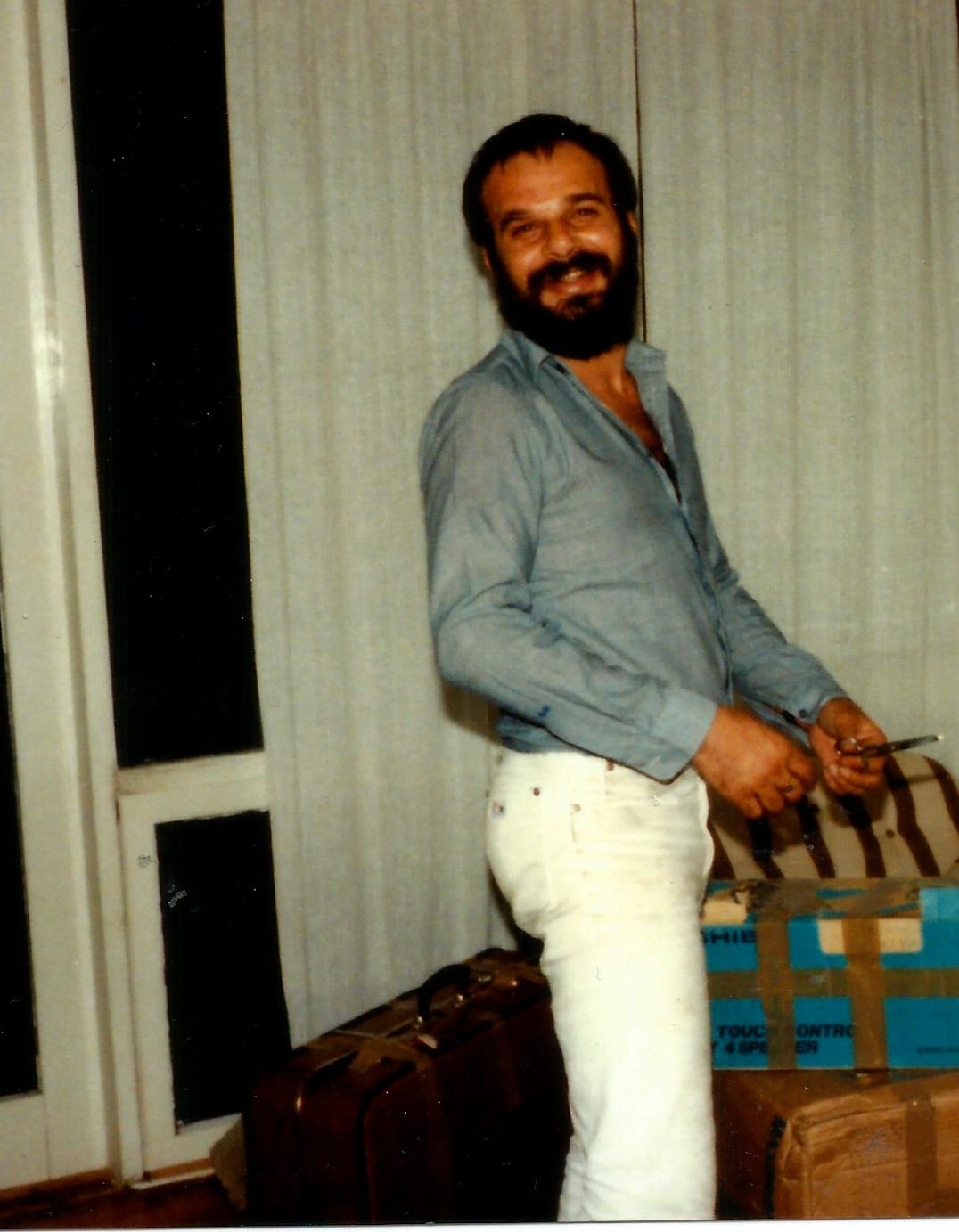
Raif Denktaş in August 1983

He taught in Eastern Mediterranean University from September 1985 to his death in December 1985.

== Political career ==
In the 1976 General Elections he was elected for the Federated Assembly as a National Unity Party MP. Even though he worked as the Secretary General, he resigned from the NUP in 1981 citing a difference in views. He founded the Alliance of Patriotic Intelligentsia in 1982 and the Social Democratic Party on 30 December 1982.

He represented his party at the Founding Parliament of the Turkish Republic of Northern Cyprus as an MP, following the establishment of the Turkish Republic of Northern Cyprus in 1983. He also changed his affiliation to the broader Social Democracy Group but had to reverse this move due to legal complications.

Denktaş was known as a strong critic of his father. Regardless of this, he was appointed by him as the Political Adviser to the President in 1985. He also opposed heavily to the government and the National Unity Party during the preparations of the constitution. As a Kemalist, he wrote many articles on Mustafa Kemal Atatürk's ideas but fiercely supported independence over a possible annexation by Turkey.

He was also known for endorsing the Cyprus peace process. His visit to the southern part of the Cyprus in 1984 along with the Communal Liberation Party leader İsmail Bozkurt and the Secretary General of the Republican Turkish Party, Naci Talat Usar was reported as the first visit by Turkish Cypriots since their displacement in 1974. This visit was criticised heavily by the nationalists and the visitors were called as "traitors" by Birlik newspaper.

== Musical career ==
Raif Denktaş played the bass guitar for the school band of TED Ankara College where two of his compatriots were also playing. Upon his return to Cyprus, he joined Bayrak Kuartet in 1968. The band was supported by the army personnel and they practised at the basement of the headquarters of the 22nd Squad where Raif was deployed.

In 1969, Sıla 4 was formed by Raif, Ferahzat Gürsoy, Erdinç Gündüz and Aydın Kalfaoğlu. Raif sang and played bass guitar for the band. Sıla 4 is regarded as the most influential music band which has shaped the Turkish Cypriot music, combining folk tunes and lyrics together and arranging them to the contemporary context.

Raif Denktaş composed many different songs including Gariban and Ayrılık which was not only popular in Cyprus, but also in Turkey.

== Death ==
In 1985, Raif Denktaş was subject to heavy criticism and alleged defamation by both the Turkish and the Turkish Cypriot press, for example, false claims that Raif was hiding Hüseyin Kocabaş, a Turkish assassin at his home, or he was involved in the trafficking of drugs in Cyprus. National Intelligence Organization of Turkey later admitted that the stories were fabricated by their agents, who were subsequently fired. Raif's father, Rauf Denktaş, claimed that he was attacked for not agreeing to Turkey's political demands at that time.

Two weeks after the allegations of drug trafficking were published, on 24 December 1985, Raif sustained fatal injuries in a car crash near Cihangir. He was returning from Famagusta after lecturing at the Eastern Mediterranean University. A military vehicle collided with the car Raif was driving. He was transported to Ankara for treatment, but died on 26 December 1985.
