= Osman Örek =

Turkish Cypriot politician, lawyer, author and academic

Prime Minister of the Turkish Federated State of Cyprus
- In office 21 April 1978 – 12 December 1978
- President: Rauf Denktaş
- Preceded by: Nejat Konuk
- Succeeded by: Mustafa Çağatay

Leader of the National Unity Party
- In office 18 April 1978 – 7 January 1979
- Preceded by: Nejat Konuk
- Succeeded by: Mustafa Çağatay

Member of the Assembly of Republic
- In office 20 June 1976 – 23 June 1985
- Constituency: Representative member (1976, 1981)

Personal details
- Born: 26 December 1925 Nicosia
- Died: 24 March 1999 (aged 73) London
- Party: National Unity Party
- Education: Istanbul University; Middle Temple

Osman Nuri Örek (26 December 1925 – 24 March 1999) was a Turkish Cypriot politician, lawyer, author, and academic. He was born in Nicosia.

Upon the declaration of the Republic of Cyprus, Osman Örek became the first minister of defence of the new republic as well as being elected as a member of parliament for the Nicosia district. He served as the speaker of the parliament from July 1976 to April 1978. Örek also served as the prime minister of Turkish Federated State of Cyprus, holding this office during a short period from 21 April 1978 to 15 December 1978.

He died in London, on 24 March 1999 at the age of 73.

Political offices
Preceded by Nejat Konuk	Prime minister of the Turkish Federated State of Cyprus; 1978–1978	Succeeded by Mustafa Çağatay
