= Orka =

Orka may refer to:

- Orca, a species of dolphin
- Orga, Cyprus, a village in Cyprus
- Orka (character), a fictional character in comic book
- Roketsan Orka, Turkish lightweight torpedo
