= New Dawn Party =

New Dawn Party Yeni Doğuş Partisi
- Abbreviation: YDP
- Founded: 1985
- Dissolved: 1993
- Merger of: TBP
- Merged into: DP
- Ideology: Turkish settler's interests Factions: Socialism; Liberalism; Islamism; Turkish Cypriot nationalism
- Political position: Big tent

The New Dawn Party (Turkish: Yeni Doğuş Partisi, YDP; also translated "New Birth Party" or "Rebirth Party") was a political party in Northern Cyprus. It represented the interest of Turkish settlers, and published the Yeni Doğuş newspaper.

== History ==
The YDP was established prior to the 1985 elections, absorbing the Turkish Union Party. It received 8.8% of the vote, winning four seats in the elections. Amongst the Turkish settler community it received 47% of the vote.

In the 1990 elections it ran as part of the Party of Democratic Struggle, an alliance with the Republican Turkish Party (CTP) and Communal Liberation Party (TKP), which was formed to oppose the ruling National Unity Party. The alliance lost the elections, and the CTP and TKP MPs subsequently boycotted the Assembly of the Republic, leaving just the four members of the YDP as the opposition in the Assembly.

Prior to the 1993 elections the YDP merged into the Democratic Party.

== Ideology ==
The YDP was an umbrella party for Turkish settlers, and its members held a wide range of political beliefs, including socialism, nationalism, liberalism and Islamism.

== See also ==
- Rebirth Party (Northern Cyprus)
