= Populist Party (Northern Cyprus) =

Defunct party in Northern Cyprus

The Populist Party (Turkish: Halkçı Parti) was a left-wing political party in Northern Cyprus between 1975 and 1981.

== History ==
The party was established in 1975 by Alper Orhon, and won two seats in the 1976 elections. However, the following year one of its two MPs defected to the Communal Liberation Party. In 1981 it merged into the Democratic People's Party.

== Ideology ==
The party had social democratic principles, and was considered to be a Cypriot version of the Republican People's Party in Turkey. It was critical of the National Unity Party government's handling of economic affairs, particularly the dependence on Turkey for economic development. It supported government-run enterprises and the participation of workers in planning.
