= Turkish Union Party =

Turkish Union Party may refer to:

- Turkish Union Party (Northern Cyprus)
- Unity Party (Turkey)
