= Free Democratic Party (Northern Cyprus) =

Free Democratic Party Hür Demokrat Parti
- Founder: İsmet Kotak
- Founded: 1990
- Preceded by: Progressive People's Party; Democratic Struggle Party
- Succeeded by: Democratic Party
- Headquarters: Lefkosia, Turkish Republic of Northern Cyprus
- Ideology: Liberal democracy
- Political position: Center-right

The Free Democratic Party (Turkish: Hür Demokrat Parti, HDP), was a center-right liberal political party in Turkish Republic of Northern Cyprus. The party was founded after 1990 elections by İsmet Kotak.

The Free Democratic Party was successor of the Progressive People's Party and its electoral bloc Democratic Struggle Party. After dissolution of the Free Democratic Party, founder İsmet Kotak and his friends joined the Democratic Party.
