= Autonomous Turkish Cypriot Administration =

Body created after the 1974 Turkish invasion

Autonomous Turkish Cypriot Administration Otonom Kıbrıs Türk Yönetimi
- 1974–1975
- Flag

- Status: De facto autonomous region of the Republic of Cyprus
- Capital: North Nicosia

Government
  - President: Rauf Denktaş
- History
  - Decision to establish the administration: 1 October 1974
  - Decision to establish the Turkish Federated State of Cyprus: 13 February 1975
- Currency: Cypriot pound (first 2-3 months); Turkish lira
Preceded by	Succeeded by
Provisional Turkish Cypriot Administration	Turkish Federated State of Cyprus

The Autonomous Turkish Cypriot Administration (Turkish: Otonom Kıbrıs Türk Yönetimi) was the name of a de facto administration established by the Turkish Cypriots in present-day Northern Cyprus immediately after the Turkish invasion of Cyprus in 1974.

== Politics ==
The first "executive committee" of the administration assumed office on 26 August 1974, but the administration was officially established on 1 October 1974. The decision to establish it was "necessitated by the political reflection of the massive social change in the island". The executive committee was replaced by the first Turkish Cypriot cabinet on 8 October 1974. The administration kept Northern Cyprus under a state of emergency until 20 December 1974.

The administration was nominally autonomous under the Republic of Cyprus, with the republic's constitution being in place. The president, Rauf Denktaş, was called "Vice President and President of the Autonomous Turkish Cypriot Administration", with reference to the vice-presidential position reserved for Turkish Cypriots in the republic. The members of the parliament also kept their previous positions, representing districts like Paphos, which were now in the south.

Within three months of its establishment, the administration created four new ministries to meet demands, these were the Ministry of Energy, Ministry of Planning and Coordination, Ministry of Refugees and Rehabilitation and Ministry of Tourism.

According to Andrew Borowiec, the immediate functioning of the administration was hindered by the heavy military presence on its territory. On 30 August, when the administration had recently been unofficially established, there were reportedly 17 roadblocks between Famagusta and Nicosia.

== Economy ==
The minister of Labor and Social Works of the administration was İsmet Kotak. The administration reorganised the customs of the port of Famagusta and reopened it on 6 September 1974. Initially, the Cypriot pound was used as the currency, but the severed ties with the Cypriot central bank and resulting monetary difficulties prompted the administration to switch to the Turkish lira. The Ercan International Airport, then called the Tymbou Airport, was opened to chartered flights and some 75,000 tons of citrus fruits grown in the territory were exported. Efforts were made to reopen the closed tourism establishments, and nine hotels were reopened until November 1974. With help from the Turkish Airlines, the Cyprus Turkish Airlines was established and started flights to Turkey by January 1975.

The administration received great economic and administrative help from Turkey, which ran development programs headed by the ambassador, Ziya Müezzinoğlu, and trained Turkish Cypriot officers. Under these programs, Ziraat Bank of Turkey functioned as the central bank under the administration. The connections of Northern Cyprus were established through Turkey, including mail and telephone lines, and a new postal system was set in place, with the officers being trained by their Turkish counterparts. The farms and livestock left behind by Greek Cypriots were "integrated" into the economy. Two state farms were established, one in Famagusta and the other in Morphou. More than 100 factories in the territory were incorporated into a company with public shares.

== Society ==
The administration allowed Turkish military personnel who participated in the invasion to obtain Turkish Cypriot citizenship and settle in Northern Cyprus. The resettlement of displaced Turkish Cypriots from the south was overseen.

Andrew Borowiec wrote that Turkey announced plans to settle 5000 farm workers in the island to take up the abandoned rural possessions of Greek Cypriots. This led to Greek and Greek Cypriot accusations that Turkey was purposefully changing the demographic structure of Cyprus.
