= Sıla 4 =

Cypriot folk rock band

- Origin: Nicosia, Cyprus
- Genres: Cypriot Folk, Folk rock, Rock, Psychedelic
- Years active: 1964-1985, 1987-1989, 2007-2012
- Labels: Kent Plak, Diskotür, Grafson Plak
- Spinoffs: The Lightnings, Bayrak Quartet

Sıla 4 (Sıla Dört) is a Cypriot folk rock band formed in Nicosia, Cyprus in 1964. Widely regarded for pioneering and modernising Turkish Cypriot folk music. The band consisted of Erdinç Gündüz, Raif Denktaş, Aydın Kalfaoğlu and Ferahzad Gürsoy. The band cemented themselves in Turkish Cypriot music psyche and to this day are synonymous with Turkish Cypriot folk rock and folk music.

== History ==
The band formed in Nicosia in 1964 initially under the name "Bayrak Quartet", named after Bayrak Radio, the first Turkish Cypriot radio network where two of the band members; Erdinç and Raif worked. Ferahzad Gürsoy and Yılmaz Kalfaoğlu (Aydın Kalfaoğlu's brother) were part of a band called "The Lightnings" formed in 1962 alongs with two Armenian Cypriot musicians: Bedik Arakelyan and Cirayir Petrosyan. "The Lightnings" were disbanded after the intercommunal violence that took place in Cyprus in December 1963. Ferahzad Gürsoy and Yılmaz Kalfaoğlu later joined the Bayrak Quartet. With the introduction of Ferahzad Gürsoy in to the band, who previously worked as a drummer for Kamran Aziz as well, who is regarded alongside Sıla 4 for her contributions to Turkish Cypriot folk music, brought along his experience and exposure to Kamran Aziz. Kamran Aziz is cited as a major influence for the band. Following Yılmaz Kalfaoğlu's departure from the band, his younger brother Aydın Kalfaoğlu joined the band in 1966, forming the core four members that would establish Sıla 4 as a household name.

The band intensified their songwriting after three of the members Gündüz, Denktaş and Kalfaoğlu, moved to Ankara for their studies in 1969, followed by Gürsoy coming in 1970, where they lived in the same house. This era amounted for the most fruitful period for their music production. In this time they were signed to record labels in Cyprus and Turkey such as Keravnos Records in Cyprus and Kent, Diskotür and Grafson in Turkey.

Their first EP release of Kıbrısım ("My Cyprus" song by Kamran Aziz) and Dolama dolamayı, became an instant hit in Cyprus. The band followed their success from releases in 1971 for the song "Gelmedin" and "Gariban" in 1973. There were rumours that these two songs; Gelmedin and Gariban were banned in Turkey due to controversial political lyrics. Allegations were denied by Erdinç Gündüz and rumours are believed to be false.

By 1973, the band members were also pursuing other professions, as time that they could spare for their music declined significantly, and after 1974, music production completely halted. Erdinç Gündüz and Ferahzad Gürsoy continued with music, hosting radio shows in Bayrak radio. Aydın Kalfaoğlu completed his studies and became a lawyer, Raif Denktaş went to Oxford for his masters and went into politics, forming his own political party opposing his father. Raif Denktaş was the son of consequential Turkish Cypriot politician Rauf Raif Denktaş. The band members frequently met up but didn't produce new material until 1985, The Raif-Erdinç duo, who co-wrote numerous Sıla 4 songs, released their final work; "Ata Binesim Geldi" in 1985, just a few months before Raif Denktaş's controversial death in a car accident following collision with a military vehicle. Just as thoughts of returning to the studio and music composition were igniting, Raif's death plunged Sıla 4 into a period of creative silence. Sıla 4 performed their last concert as a full band in 1984 to an intimate crowd on top of Saray Hotel in Nicosia.

Sıla 4 performed again in 1987, 1988 and 1989 in memory of their bandmate Raif Denktaş. Where they compiled their live recordings in the album Anı (remembrance/memory in Turkish). It wasn't until 2009 that the band members came together again after pressure from Erdinç Gündüz's son Arda Gündüz, who also became a notable musician, where he encouraged them to re-record some of their most famous songs, and released their final recorded album; Sıla 4 2009.

Following Raif Denktaş's passing in 1985, Aydın Kalfaoğlu died in 2015, followed by Erdinç Gündüz in 2025.

== Musical style ==
In 1969, the band embarked on a journey to conduct extensive research in order to find forgotten or nearly forgotten folk tunes, collecting many folk songs and multiple “mani” (a particular poetic folk and musical form) and "Türküler” (Turkish folk songs). Around 10 folk songs and thousands of manis were collected in villages from Paphos to Karpass Peninsula. Sıla 4 composed the songs using traditional Cypriot folk melodies, mixing them with western instruments, while predominantly singing in vernacular Cypriot Turkish. Their style ranged from traditional Cypriot folk and folk rock, with elements and influences from psychedelic rock, blues and early Anatolian rock.

== Band Members ==
- Erdinç Gündüz - vocals, lead guitar, lyrics
- Raif Denktaş - vocals, bass, lyrics
- Aydın Kalfaoğlu - vocals, rhythm guitar
- Ferahzad Gürsoy - percussion/drums
