= 1990 Northern Cypriot parliamentary election =

← 1985	6 May 1990	1993 →
- 50 seats in the Assembly of the Republic; 26 seats needed for a majority
Party	Leader	Vote %	Seats	+/–
UBP	Derviş Eroğlu	54.7	34	+10
DMP (CTP–TKP–YDP–DHP)		44.5	16	−10
This lists parties that won seats. See the complete results below.
Prime Minister before	Prime Minister after
Derviş Eroğlu; UBP	Derviş Eroğlu; UBP

Parliamentary elections were held in Northern Cyprus on 6 May 1990. The opposition Republican Turkish Party, Communal Liberation Party, Democratic People's Party, Social Democratic Party and New Dawn Party ran in an alliance known as the Party for Democratic Struggle to oppose the ruling National Unity Party (UBP). The UBP received 54.7% of the vote and won 34 of the 50 seats, whilst the DMP took the remaining 16 seats.

== Results ==
Party	Votes	%	Seats	+/–
National Unity Party	954,592	54.68	34	+10
Party for Democratic Struggle	776,418	44.47	16	–10
New Cyprus Party	14,719	0.84	0	New
Independents	181	0.01	0	New
Total	1,745,910	100.00	50	0
Valid votes	94,403	97.42		
Invalid/blank votes	2,504	2.58		
Total votes	96,907	100.00		
Registered voters/turnout	101,306	95.66		
Source: YSK

== Aftermath ==
Following the election, the 12 MPs who were members of the Republican Turkish Party and Communal Liberation Party started boycotting the Assembly of the Republic, claiming that Turkey had putting money into the election campaign to support the government. Following by-elections for the 12 vacant seats in October 1991, they were replaced in the Assembly by UBP members, who then held 46 of the 50 seats.
