= Melouseia =

Melouseia Μελούσεια (Greek) Kırıkkale (Turkish)
- village
- Location in Cyprus
- Coordinates: 35°4′38″N 33°35′4″E
- Country (de jure): Cyprus
  - District: Larnaca District
- Country (de facto): Northern Cyprus
  - District: Lefkoşa District

Population (2011)
  - Total: 390
- Time zone: UTC+2 (EET)
  - Summer (DST): UTC+3 (EEST)

Melouseia (Greek: Μελούσεια; Turkish: Kırıkkale) is a village in the Larnaca District of Cyprus, about 7 kilometres (4.3 mi) east of Athienou. It is one of four villages in the district under the de facto control of Northern Cyprus, the other three being Arsos, Pergamos and Tremetousia.
