= Hasan Bozer =

Cypriot politician

Speaker of the Assembly of the Republic (Northern Cyprus)
- In office 6 May 2009 – 28 August 2013
- Preceded by: Fatma Ekenoğlu
- Succeeded by: Sibel Siber

Personal details
- Born: 1944 (age 81–82) Paphos, British Cyprus
- Party: National Unity Party
- Education: Hacettepe University
- Profession: Medical doctor, politician

Hasan Bozer (born 1944) is a politician. He served as the speaker of the Assembly of the Republic of Northern Cyprus. from 6 May 2009 to 28 August 2013.

Bozer is married and has one child.
