= Tremetousia =

Tremetousia: Τρεμετουσιά (Greek); Tremeşe (Turkish)
- Village
- Location in Cyprus
- Coordinates: 35°5′1″N 33°36′28″E
- Country (de jure): Cyprus
  - District: Larnaca District
- Country (de facto): Northern Cyprus
  - District: Lefkoşa District

Population (2011)
  - Total: 169
- Time zone: UTC+2 (EET)
  - Summer (DST): UTC+3 (EEST)

Tremetousia (Greek: Τρεμετουσιά [locally [tremetuˈʃa]]; Turkish: Tremeşe or Erdemli) is a village in the Larnaca District of Cyprus, 7 km (4.3 mi) east of Athienou. It is one of only four villages in the district under the control of Northern Cyprus, the other three being Arsos, Melouseia and Pergamos.

The village is the successor of the ancient city Tremithus or Tremithous (Ancient Greek: Τρεμιθοῦς), mentioned by Ptolemy, Hierocles, George of Cyprus, Stephanus of Byzantium and other ancient geographers. The imperial claimnant Isaac Komnenos of Cyprus was defeated here in 1191 by Richard I of England, who afterwards took possession of Cyprus. The city was then destroyed and survives only as a village.

== Name ==
There are two legends concerning the name Tremithous (Τρεμιθοῦς).

One holds that when Aphrodite set foot upon the land, the very earth trembled at her divine presence, and for this reason the place came to be called Tremithus (from τρέμειν, "to tremble").

The other was that the name came from the terebinth trees growing in the area, which the Cypriots called tremithoi (τρέμιθοι).

== Bishops of Tremithus ==
The most famous of the bishops of the see of Tremithus is Saint Spyridon, who is famous throughout the Eastern Orthodox Church. Others venerated as saints are Arcadius and Nestor. Saint Spyridon participated in the First Council of Nicaea (325), Theopompus in the First Council of Constantinople in 381, Theodore, the author of a biography of Saint John Chrysostom, in the Third Council of Constantinople in 681, George in the Second Council of Nicaea in 787. Another Spyridon is mentioned in 1081.
