= Zorlu Töre =

Turkish Cypriot politician (born 1956)

Assembly Speaker of Northern Cyprus
- In office 2022–2024
- Succeeded by: Ziya Öztürkler

Personal details
- Party: National Unity Party

Zorlu Töre (born 1956) is a Turkish Cypriot politician. He served as the Northern Cyprus Assembly Speaker from 2022 to 2024, losing a re-election vote with 23 votes in his favour and 25 votes to reject him.
