= Ziya Öztürkler =

Cypriot politician

Assembly Speaker of Northern Cyprus
- Incumbent
- Assumed office 21 October 2024
- Preceded by: Zorlu Töre

Personal details
- Party: National Unity Party
- Education: Near East University

Dr Ziya Öztürkler (born 1978) is a Turkish Cypriot politician, serving as the current Assembly Speaker of Northern Cyprus since October 2024.

== Early life ==
He was born in Güzelyurt in 1978. He graduated from Near East University Turkish Language and Literature Department in 1999. He received his master's degree at the Department of Folklore Education at Near East University and his doctorate at the Department of Educational Management, Supervision, Economics and Planning at Near East University. He completed Yıldız Technical University Management and Leadership Certificate Program.

== Career ==
He worked as a teacher at Lefke Gazi High School, Şehit Turgut Secondary School and Bülent Ecevit Anatolian High School between 2001 and 2014. He was appointed and served as the director of the Department of Higher Education and Foreign Relations of the Ministry of National Education between 2014 and 2022.

=== Entry to politics ===
He was elected as the National Unity Party Güzelyurt Deputy in the 2022 parliamentary elections, and served as the Minister of Internal Affairs from May 2, 2022, to 11 August 2023.

On 21 October 2024, he was elected Speaker in the 15th round, with 26 votes in his favour and 23 votes against, after his predecessor Töre was defeated in a re-election attempt with 23 votes in his favour and 25 votes to reject him.
