= Orka, Cyprus =

Orka: Όρκα (Greek); Kayalar (Turkish)
- Village
- Location in Cyprus
- Coordinates: 35°21′32″N 33°1′53″E
- Country (de jure): Cyprus
  - District: Kyrenia District
- Country (de facto): Northern Cyprus
  - District: Girne District
- Time zone: UTC+2 (EET)
  - Summer (DST): UTC+3 (EEST)

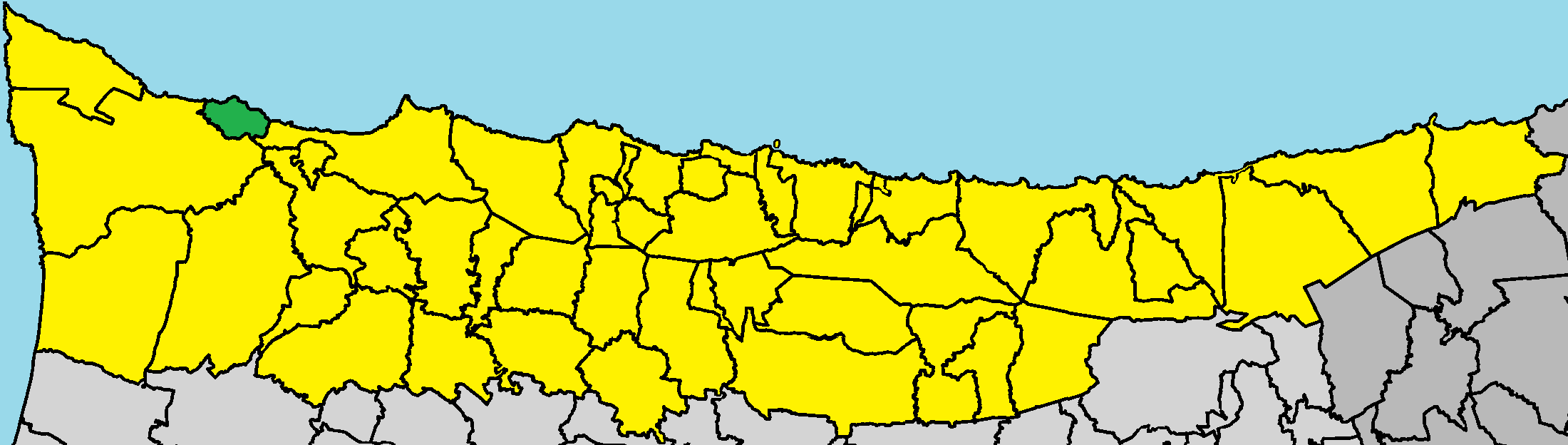
Orka in Kyrenia District

Orka (Greek: Όρκα, Turkish: Kayalar) is a small village in Kyrenia District located on the northern coast of Cyprus, approximately 3 km north of Kormakitis. It is under the de facto control of Northern Cyprus.

Before the Turkish invasion of Cyprus in 1974, Orka was an entirely Greek Cypriot village. The 1960 census put the population at 139 Greek Cypriots, while in 1973 the population consisted of 98 Greek Cypriots and 17 other nationals. The Greek Cypriots fled as the Turkish army advanced in 1974. The village was repopulated in 1975 by Turkish settlers, who now make up the majority of the population. Orka was a popular destination for British nationals before 1974 and these nationals have kept their properties to this day. Some Turkish Cypriots and Europeans have also bought property and settled in the village in the 2000s.
