= 1993 Northern Cypriot parliamentary election =

← 1990	12 December 1993	1998 →
- All 50 seats in the Assembly of the Republic; 26 seats needed for a majority
Party	Leader	Vote %	Seats	+/–
UBP	Derviş Eroğlu	29.86	16	−18
DP	Hakkı Atun	29.20	16	New
CTP	Özker Özgür	24.16	13	
TKP	Alpay Durduran	13.27	5	
This lists parties that won seats. See the complete results below.
Prime Minister before	Prime Minister after
Derviş Eroğlu; UBP	Hakkı Atun; DP

Parliamentary elections were held in Northern Cyprus on 12 December 1993. Although the ruling National Unity Party (UBP) received the most votes, a government was formed by the opposition Democratic Party and the Republican Turkish Party, making this the first time the National Unity Party had lost power.

== Results ==
Party	Votes	%	Seats	+/–
National Unity Party	535,316	29.86	16	–18
Democratic Party	523,487	29.20	16	New
Republican Turkish Party	433,134	24.16	13	–
Communal Liberation Party	237,950	13.27	5	–
Nationalist Justice Party	35,496	1.98	0	New
New Cyprus Party	21,590	1.20	0	0
Unity and Sovereignty Party	5,890	0.33	0	New
Independents	69	0.00	0	0
Total	1,792,932	100.00	50	0
Valid votes	96,011	95.19		
Invalid/blank votes	4,856	4.81		
Total votes	100,867	100.00		
Registered voters/turnout	107,820	93.55		
Source: YSK
