= Ahmet Mithat Berberoğlu =

Northern Cyprus politician (1921–2002)

Leader of the Republican Turkish Party
- In office 27 December 1970 – 31 October 1976
- Preceded by: Office established
- Succeeded by: Özker Özgür

Personal details
- Born: 8 April 1921 Limassol, Cyprus
- Died: 4 April 2002 (aged 80)
- Education: University of Istanbul

Ahmet Mithat Berberoğlu (8 April 1921 – 4 April 2002) was a Turkish Cypriot politician and the founder of the Republican Turkish Party. He was born on May 8, 1921, in Limassol. He studied at Istanbul University Law School and studied law in London. In the elections of the House of Representatives held on 31 July 1960, he was able to enter the 1st House of Representatives of the Republic of Cyprus as a member of Girne (Kyrenia). The Assembly of the Republic on 5 July 1970 elected to parliament again. About five months later, on December 27, 1970, he founded the Republican Turkish Party, becoming the party's first leader. On the 13th of February 1975, as the deputy came to an end, one year later Özker Özgür became the party leader. He died on April 4, 2002. He was married and had a child.
