= 1981 Northern Cypriot general election =

- 28 June 1981
- Turnout: 88.62%
- Presidential election
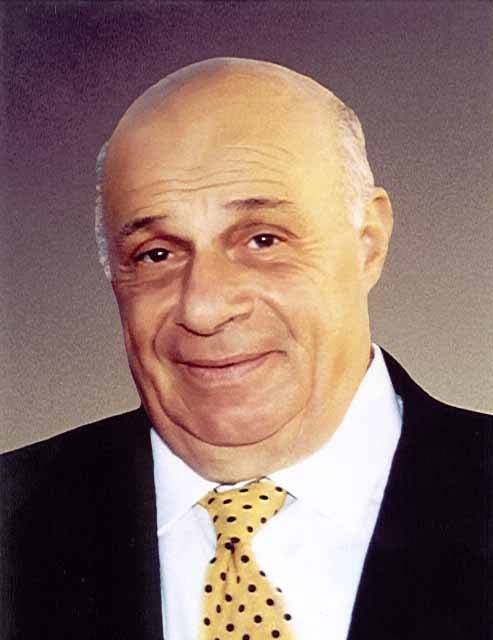

Candidate	Rauf Denktaş	Ziya Rızkı	Özker Özgür
Party	UBP	TKP	CTP
Popular vote	36,386	21,483	8,958
Percentage	51.71%	30.53%	12.73%
President before election
Rauf Denktaş
UBP
President-elect
Rauf Denktaş
UBP
- Parliamentary election
- 40 seats in the National Council; 21 seats needed for a majority
Party	Leader	Vote %	Seats	+/–
UBP	Mustafa Çağatay	42.53%	18	−12
TKP	Alpay Durduran	28.53%	13	+7
CTP	Özker Özgür	15.05%	5	+3
DHP	Nejat Konuk	8.09%	3	New
TBP	İsmail Tezer	5.51%	1	New
This lists parties that won seats. See the complete results below.
Prime Minister before	Prime Minister after
Mustafa Çağatay; UBP	Nejat Konuk; DHP

General elections were held in Northern Cyprus on 28 June 1981. Rauf Denktaş was re-elected President, whilst his National Unity Party remained the largest party in the National Council, although it lost its majority.

== Results ==
=== President ===
Denktaş was also supported by the Turkish Union Party, the Social Justice Party and the National Goal Party.

Candidate	Party	Votes	%
Rauf Denktaş	National Unity Party	36,386	51.71
Ziya Rızkı	Communal Liberation Party	21,483	30.53
Özker Özgür	Republican Turkish Party	8,958	12.73
Hüsamettin Tanyar	Democratic People's Party	3,354	4.77
Servet Dedeçay	Independent	180	0.26
Total		70,361	100.00
Valid votes		70,361	93.75
Invalid/blank votes		4,690	6.25
Total votes		75,051	100.00
Registered voters/turnout		84,693	88.62
Source: YSK

=== National Council ===
Party	Votes	%	Seats	+/–
National Unity Party	431,732	42.53	18	–12
Communal Liberation Party	289,555	28.53	13	+7
Republican Turkish Party	152,805	15.05	5	+3
Democratic People's Party	82,130	8.09	3	New
Turkish Union Party	55,895	5.51	1	New
National Goal Party	1,544	0.15	0	New
Social Justice Party	990	0.10	0	New
Independents	415	0.04	0	New
Total	1,015,066	100.00	40	0
Valid votes	68,524	91.27		
Invalid/blank votes	6,557	8.73		
Total votes	75,081	100.00		
Registered voters/turnout	84,721	88.62		
Source: YSK
