= Federation of Turkish Cypriot Trade Unions =

TURK-SEN
- Federation of Turkish Cypriot Trade Unions (TURK-SEN)
- Kıbrıs Türk İşçi Sendikaları Federasyonu (TÜRK-SEN)
- Founded: 1954
- Headquarters: Nicosia, Cyprus
- Location: Cyprus
- Members: 12,000
- Key people: Arslan Bıçaklı, president Erkan Birer, secretary general
- Affiliations: ITUC, ETUC
- Şehit Mahmut Redif Hüseyin Sokak No:7/A LEFKOŞA

The Federation of Turkish Cypriot Trade Unions (TURK-SEN) is a federation of 9 trade unions in Cyprus. It is affiliated with the International Trade Union Confederation, and the European Trade Union Confederation.
