= List of speakers of the Assembly of the Republic (Northern Cyprus) =

The following is a list of speakers of the Assembly of the Republic (Northern Cyprus).

== List ==
Below is a list of office-holders:

Name	Took office	Left office	Party	Notes
Rauf Denktaş	24 February 1975	3 July 1976	National Unity Party	
Osman Örek	3 July 1976	27 April 1978	National Unity Party	
Oğuz Ramadan Korhan	11 May 1978	13 July 1981	National Unity Party	
Nejat Konuk	18 July 1981	8 December 1983	National Unity Party	
Oğuz Ramadan Korhan	8 December 1983	8 July 1985	National Unity Party	
Hakkı Atun	17 July 1985	28 June 1993	National Unity Party	
Vehbi Zeki Serter	30 June 1993	25 December 1993	National Unity Party	
Ayan Halit Acarkan	3 January 1994	4 October 1996	National Unity Party	
Hakkı Atun	4 October 1996	18 December 1998	Democratic Party	
Ertugrul Hasipoğlu	28 December 1998	2 October 2001	National Unity Party	
Dr. Vehbi Zeki Serter	2 October 2001	26 December 2003	National Unity Party	
Dr. Fatma Ekenoğlu	14 January 2004	1 May 2009	Republican Turkish Party	
Hasan Bozer	6 May 2009	12 August 2013	National Unity Party	
Sibel Siber	12 August 2013	22 January 2018	Republican Turkish Party	
Teberrüken Uluçay	22 January 2018	18 January 2021	Republican Turkish Party	
Önder Sennaroğlu	18 January 2021	7 February 2022	National Unity Party	
Zorlu Töre	7 March 2022	October 2024	National Unity Party	
Ziya Öztürkler	October 2024	Incumbent	National Unity Party	
