= Mustafa Çağatay =

Turkish Cypriot politician

Prime Minister of Northern Cyprus
- In office 15 November 1983 – 13 December 1983
- President: Rauf Denktaş
- Preceded by: office established
- Succeeded by: Nejat Konuk

Prime Minister of the Turkish federated state of Cyprus
- In office 12 December 1978 – 15 November 1983
- Preceded by: Osman Örek
- Succeeded by: office abolished

Minister of Labour and Social Security
- In office 8 July 1977 – 21 April 1978
- Prime Minister: Nejat Konuk

Minister of Labour, Social Works and Health
- In office 21 April 1978 – 27 June 1978
- Prime Minister: Osman Örek

Leader of the National Unity Party
- In office 7 January 1979 – 30 November 1983
- Preceded by: Osman Örek
- Succeeded by: Derviş Eroğlu

Member of the Assembly of Republic
- In office 20 June 1976 – 23 June 1985
- Constituency: Girne (1976, 1981)

Personal details
- Born: 20 April 1937 Limassol, British Cyprus
- Died: 3 April 1989 (aged 51) Kyrenia, Northern Cyprus
- Party: National Unity Party
- Spouse: Tuncay Çağatay

Mustafa Çağatay (20 April 1937 – 3 April 1989) was a Turkish Cypriot politician who served as the first Prime Minister of the Turkish Republic of Northern Cyprus from 15 November 1983 to 13 December 1983. He was previously prime minister of the Turkish Federated State of Cyprus from 1978 to 1983.

== Early life and early political career ==
Çağatay was born on 20 April 1937 in the town of Limassol. He completed middle school in Limassol and graduated from the Nicosia Boys' High School. Having worked as a civil servant in the Limassol District Court for three years, he then went to London to train as a lawyer and returned in 1963, having completed his training. He started working as a lawyer and joined the Turkish Resistance Organisation, serving as a legal adviser in the Limassol District headquarters. He then served as a military commander during the intercommunal fighting of 1964, he is noted to have led a significant resistance on 13 February 1964.

He was elected to the Turkish Cypriot Communal Assembly on 5 July 1970, representing Limassol. Following the Turkish invasion of Cyprus in 1974 and the Greek Cypriot capture of the Turkish Cypriot enclave of Limassol, Çağatay was arrested as a prisoner of war. He was later released, displaced to Northern Cyprus and represented Turkish Cypriots in talks with Greek Cypriots as a representative of the Turkish Cypriots of Limassol.

== Member of Parliament and Prime Minister ==
He was elected as a member of the parliament representing the Girne District for the National Unity Party (UBP) in the parliamentary election of 1976. He then served as the Vice President of the UBP group in the parliament. In the First Konuk cabinet, he was appointed as the Minister of Finance on 18 December 1976 and the Minister of Labour and Social Security in a cabinet reshuffle on 8 July 1977. He served in this position until the end of the cabinet on 21 April 1978. He then became the Minister of Labour, Social Works and Health in the Örek cabinet, which took office on 21 April 1978. However, on 27 June 1978, he resigned from this post.

His term as prime minister saw the consolidation of the state in Northern Cyprus. According to political scientist and columnist Hasan Hastürer, President Rauf Denktaş heavily interfered with the government during his term as prime minister and a system of exploitation of Greek Cypriot properties and corruption was in place. However, according to Hastürer, Çağatay never actually exploited any Greek Cypriot property, never allowed any relatives any privileges and was known as a man of integrity. According to the then-politician Ali Atun, Çağatay was eliminated from his position by Denktaş for unknown reasons; Mehmet Hasgüler, a professor of political science, has written that it is rumoured that when Çağatay visited Turkey as the founding Prime Minister of Northern Cyprus, he would only be met by a governor, upon which he refused to go out of the plane, and said that Çağatay's immediate "removal" from Prime Ministry and the end of his political career suggest that this may be partly true.

== Death ==
He died on 3 April 1989, in a traffic accident in Kyrenia.

Political offices
Preceded by Osman Örek	Prime minister of the Turkish Republic of Northern Cyprus; 1978–1983	Succeeded by Nejat Konuk
