= Democratic People's Party (Northern Cyprus) =

Political party in Northern Cyprus

The Democratic People's Party (Turkish: Demokratik Halk Partisi) was a conservative political party in Northern Cyprus.

== History ==
The party was established in 1979 by defectors from the National Unity Party led by Nejat Konuk. The party began with five members of the National Council, and gained a sixth in 1981 when the Populist Party merged into it.

The 1981 elections saw the party reduced to only three seats due to voter dissatisfaction with the territory's conservative parties. The party's presidential candidate Husamettin Tanyar finished fourth with 4.8% of the vote. Following the election Konuk was elected Speaker. The party failed to win a seat in the 1985 elections, and did not contest any further elections.

== Ideology ==
The party claimed to hold social democratic principles, but was opposed to state intervention in the economy.
