= Fatma Ekenoğlu =

Turkish Cypriot female politician

Fatma Ekenoğlu (born in Paphos in 1956) is a Turkish Cypriot politician. She was the first female Speaker of the Republican Assembly of Northern Cyprus from 14 January 2004 to 1 May 2009. She is a member of the Republican Turkish Party. Pursuant to Article 105 of the Constitution of Northern Cyprus, she served as Acting president "in the event of the President of the Republic being temporarily absent from his office". Ekenoğlu studied at the Cerrahpaşa Faculty of Medicine at Istanbul University.
