= 1976 Northern Cypriot general election =

- 20 June 1976
- Presidential election
- Turnout: 74.84%
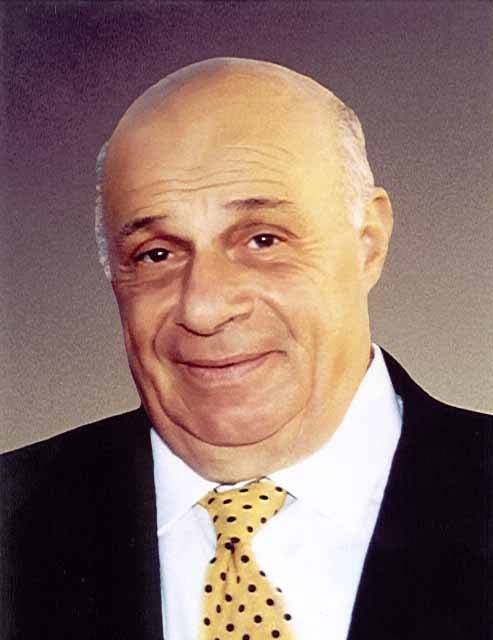

Candidate	Rauf Denktaş	Ahmet Berberoğlu
Party	UBP	CTP
Popular vote	41,242	11,739
Percentage	76.61%	21.81%
President-elect
Rauf Denktaş
UBP
- Parliamentary election
- All 40 seats in the National Council; 21 seats needed for a majority
- Turnout: 74.31
Party	Leader	Vote %	Seats
UBP	Rauf Denktaş	53.73	30
TKP	Alpay Durduran	20.18	6
CTP	Ahmet Berberoğlu	12.85	2
Populist	Alper Orhon	11.74%	2
This lists parties that won seats. See the complete results below.
Prime Minister before	Prime Minister after
Rauf Denktaş; UBP	Nejat Konuk; UBP

General elections were held in Northern Cyprus on 20 June 1976. Rauf Denktaş of the National Unity Party was elected President, with the National Unity Party also winning 30 of the 40 seats in the National Council.

== Background ==
The Turkish invasion of Cyprus in 1974 had led to the establishment of the Turkish Federated State of Northern Cyprus. A referendum in June 1975 approved a new constitution, which provided for a presidential republic with a 40-seat unicameral National Council.

== Results ==
=== President ===
Candidate	Party	Votes	%
Rauf Denktaş	National Unity Party	41,242	76.61
Ahmet Mithat Berberoğlu	Republican Turkish Party	11,739	21.81
Mustafa Lusignan	Independent	427	0.79
Servet Dedeçay	Independent	423	0.79
Total		53,831	100.00
Valid votes		53,831	94.91
Invalid/blank votes		2,887	5.09
Total votes		56,718	100.00
Registered voters/turnout		75,781	74.84
Source: YSK

=== National Council ===
Party	Votes	%	Seats
National Unity Party	408,380	53.73	30
Communal Liberation Party	153,393	20.18	6
Republican Turkish Party	97,637	12.85	2
Populist Party	89,260	11.74	2
Independents	11,369	1.50	0
Total	760,039	100.00	40
Valid votes	51,880	92.07	
Invalid/blank votes	4,466	7.93	
Total votes	56,346	100.00	
Registered voters/turnout	75,824	74.31	
Source: YSK
