= 1985 Northern Cypriot parliamentary election =

- 23 June 1985
- 50 seats in the Assembly of the Republic; 26 seats needed for a majority
Party	Leader	Vote %	Seats	+/–
UBP	Derviş Eroğlu	36.74	24	+6
CTP	Özker Özgür	21.37	12	+7
TKP	Alpay Durduran	15.85	10	−3
YDP		8.76	4	New
This lists parties that won seats. See the complete results below.
Prime Minister before	Prime Minister after
Nejat Konuk; UBP	Derviş Eroğlu; UBP

Parliamentary elections were held in Northern Cyprus on 23 June 1985. The National Unity Party remained the largest party in the National Council, winning 24 of the 50 seats.

== Results ==
Party	Votes	%	Seats	+/–
National Unity Party	546,582	36.74	24	+6
Republican Turkish Party	317,843	21.37	12	+7
Communal Liberation Party	235,720	15.85	10	–3
New Dawn Party	130,307	8.76	4	New
Democratic People's Party	110,549	7.43	0	–3
Communal Progress Party	90,460	6.08	0	New
Social Democrat Party	56,076	3.77	0	New
Total	1,487,537	100.00	50	+10
Valid votes	79,812	95.96		
Invalid/blank votes	3,363	4.04		
Total votes	83,175	100.00		
Registered voters/turnout	95,124	87.44		
Source: YSK
