= Turkish Union Party (Northern Cyprus) =

Political party in Northern Cyprus

The Turkish Union Party (Turkish: Türk Birliği Partisi, TBP) was a right-wing political party in Northern Cyprus, led by İsmail Tezer. It represented the interest of Turkish settlers.

== History ==
The TBP was established in 1979 by retired army officers, and was the Cypriot version of the Nationalist Movement Party in Turkey. It performed poorly in the 1980 local elections and won only a single seat in Famagusta in the 1981 National Council elections, taken by Tezer. However, in villages populated by Turkish settlers it received 32% of the vote.

Prior to the 1985 elections the party merged into the newly established New Dawn Party.

== Ideology ==
The TBP described itself as a national socialist party. It advocated Northern Cyprus becoming part of Turkey, and courted support from Turkish settlers. Tezer himself had moved to the island from Turkey after the 1974 invasion.
