= İsmet Kotak =

Turkish-Cypriot journalist and statesperson (1939–2011)

- Born: 1939; Famagusta, Cyprus, United Kingdom
- Died: 11 September 2011 (aged 71–72); Nicosia, Northern Cyprus
- Education: Ankara University, Faculty of Political Sciences
- Occupations: Politician, public administrator, journalist, columnist
- Political party: National Unity Party; Democratic People's Party; Progressive People's Party; Free Democratic Party; Democratic Party

İsmet Kotak (1939 – 11 September 2011) was a Turkish Cypriot politician, public administrator, journalist and columnist.

İsmet Kotak was Member of Parliament (1970–85, 1990–93), Minister of Labour (1969–76), Minister of Industry and Co-operatives (1982–83), director-general of the Bayrak Radio Television Corporation, president of Press Council in Turkish Republic of Northern Cyprus. He was one of the co-founders of Democratic People's Party and founder of the Free Democratic Party.
