= Arsos, Larnaca =

Arsos: Άρσος (Greek); Yiğitler (Turkish)
- Location in Cyprus
- Coordinates: 35°5′23″N 33°37′43″E
- Country (de jure): Cyprus
  - District: Larnaca District
- Country (de facto): Northern Cyprus
  - District: Lefkoşa District

Population (2011)
  - Total: 327
- Time zone: UTC+2 (EET)
  - Summer (DST): UTC+3 (EEST)

Arsos (Greek: Άρσος; Turkish: Yiğitler) is a village in Cyprus, about 32 km (20 mi) east of Nicosia. De facto, it is under the control of Northern Cyprus.

The construction of a road from Arsos to Pyla is one of the conditions that Northern Cyprus requested from Republic of Cyprus in return for the opening of the Limnitis crossing. A golden necklace was found in the village.
