= Nejat Konuk =

2nd prime minister of Northern Cyprus

Prime Minister of Northern Cyprus
- In office 13 December 1983 – 19 July 1985
- President: Rauf Denktaş
- Preceded by: Mustafa Çağatay
- Succeeded by: Derviş Eroğlu
- In office 3 July 1976 – 21 April 1978
- President: Rauf Denktaş
- Preceded by: Rauf Denktaş
- Succeeded by: Osman Örek

Leader of the National Unity Party
- In office 3 July 1976 – 2 March 1978
- Preceded by: Rauf Denktaş
- Succeeded by: Osman Örek

Member of the Assembly of Republic
- In office 20 June 1976 – 23 June 1985
- Constituency: Lefkoşa (1976, 1981)

Personal details
- Born: 1928 Nicosia, British Cyprus
- Died: 31 December 2014 (aged 86) Istanbul, Turkey
- Party: National Unity Party
- Education: Ankara University, Law School

Osman Nejat Konuk (1928 – 31 December 2014) was a 2nd prime minister of Northern Cyprus, He held this office twice, once from 1976 to 1978 and a second time from 1983 to 1985.

== Early life, career and death ==
Born in 1928 in Nicosia, Cyprus, Osman Nejat Konuk completed his primary and secondary education in Nicosia. In 1951, he graduated with a degree in Law from the Ankara University, Law School.

Following his graduation he worked in Turkey in the public sector as legal advisor (Bursa Forestry Department. He left public service in 1955 and worked as an independent lawyer until 1960. In 1960 he returned to Cyprus and assumed the role of General Secretary at the newly formed Turkish Community Parliament in Cyprus (Türk Cemaat Meclisi), followed by a role as the Undersecretary to the Turkish Cypriot Leader.

With the establishment of the transitional Autonomous Turkish Cypriot Administration when Rauf Denktaş became Vice-Turkish Cypriot Leader, he was appointed as Denktaş's Undersecretary. In 1969, Konuk portfolio was changed when he was appointed to be the Undersecretary of Justice and Interior.

At the 5 July 1970 general elections, he was elected to the Turkish Cypriot Community Parliament, representing Nicosia district. In the new Executive Board (government) of the Turkish Cypriot Community he was tasked with the Justice and Interior Affairs portfolio.

On 24 February 1975 on the first plenary meeting of the Parliament of the Turkish Federated State of Cyprus (KTFD) he became a member of the government and then elected as the General Secretary of his party, National Unity Party. At the 1976 general elections he was re-elected to the parliament from Nicosia. With NUP majority Konuk was appointed to form the first government of the newly formed KTFD and served as Prime Minister until he resigned from both the post and from his party in 1978.

He served as the speaker of the legislature from 1981 to 1983.

He joined the Democratic Peoples' Party (DHP) and became its leader. He was re-elected to the parliament as a DHP MP for Nicosia. In the 1983 constituent assembly of the newly formed Turkish Republic of Northern Cyprus he served as Nicosia MP and was appointed to the Premiership of the new republic serving between 1983 and 1985. In 1985 Konuk retired from active politics.

He died of cancer in his home in Istanbul, Turkey at the night of 31 December 2014, aged 86.

Political offices
Preceded by none	Prime minister of the Turkish Federated State of Cyprus; 1976–1978	Succeeded by Osman Örek
Preceded by Mustafa Çağatay	Prime minister of the Turkish Republic of Northern Cyprus; 1983–1985	Succeeded by Derviş Eroğlu
