= New Cyprus Party =

New Cyprus Party Yeni Kıbrıs Partisi
- Leader: Murat Kanatlı
- Founded: 29 October 1989
- Split from: Communal Liberation Party
- Headquarters: North Nicosia, Northern Cyprus
- Newspaper: Yeniçağ
- Ideology: Democratic socialism Union of Cyprus; Cypriotism
- Political position: Left-wing
- European affiliation: Party of the European Left
- Colours: Blue, Yellow

Website
- http://www.ykp.org.cy/

The New Cyprus Party (Turkish: Yeni Kıbrıs Partisi, YKP) is a democratic socialist Turkish-Cypriot political party. It was established on 29 October 1989. Before 2004 it was known as the Patriotic Unity Movement (Yurtsever Birlik Hareketi).
