= Turkish Federated State of Cyprus =

1975–1983 state on the region of Northern Cyprus

Coordinates: 35°11′N 33°22′E

Turkish Federated State of Cyprus Kıbrıs Türk Federe Devleti
- 1975–1983
- Flag Coat of arms

- Status: Partially-recognized federated state
- Capital: North Nicosia
- Government: Federated republic
  - President: Rauf Denktaş
- History
  - Referendum: 13 February 1975
  - Foundation of the Turkish Republic of Northern Cyprus: 15 November 1983
- Currency: Turkish lira
Preceded by	Succeeded by
Autonomous Turkish Cypriot Administration	Turkish Republic of Northern Cyprus

The Turkish Federated State of Cyprus (Note: Turkish: Kıbrıs Türk Federe Devleti, KTFD) (TFSC) was a state in Northern Cyprus, declared in 1975 and existed until 1983. This state was not recognised by the international community. It was succeeded by the Turkish Republic of Northern Cyprus.

== History ==
The UN Secretary-General came to Cyprus on 25–26 December 1974, and demanded that bilateral talks be initiated between the two communities. After the Autonomous Turkish Cypriot Administration was declared on 1 October 1974, the second phase was put into effect unilaterally on 13 February 1975 with the declaration of the Turkish Federated State of Cyprus by the Chairman of the Administration Rauf Denktaş, in the Autonomous Turkish Administration Assembly of Cyprus.

In 1975, the "Turkish Federated State of Cyprus" was declared as a first step towards a future federated Turkish Cypriot state, but was rejected by the Republic of Cyprus, the UN, and the international community. The United Nations Security Council Resolution 367 stated regret for the declaration, however, it was not regarded as a unilateral declaration of independence and an attempt at breaking away. The Turkish Cypriot leadership, headed by Rauf Denktaş, hoped that the Greek Cypriots would treat them as equals and proceed to proclaim their own federated state. Meanwhile, the transition from an "administration" to a state enabled Turkish Cypriots to write their own constitution. In the 1976 elections, the National Unity Party of Denktaş received 53.7% of votes and gained the majority in the National Council. This parliament then proceeded with the debating and writing of the constitution. All political parties agreed on a federal solution to the problem with continued guarantee of security by Turkey. Moreover, the debates were centered on ideological, social and economic grounds, with the opposition parties Republican Turkish Party and Communal Liberation Party advocating a parliamentary system and criticising the draft constitution due to the powers it gave to the president.

After eight years of failed negotiations between the Greek and Cypriot Turkish community, the North declared its independence on 15 November 1983 under the name of the Turkish Republic of Northern Cyprus. This unilateral declaration of independence was rejected by the UN via Security Council Resolution 541.

== Economy ==
In 1978, the imports of the Turkish Federated State of Cyprus were TL 2,067,457,000, whilst the exports were TL 758,453,000. In 1980, the imports were TL 7,086,008,000 and the exports were TL 3,345,262,000.
