= Communal Liberation Party =

Former political party in northern Cyprus

Communal Liberation Party Toplumcu Kurtuluş Partisi
- Abbreviation: TKP
- Leader: Alpay Durduran
- Founded: 1976
- Dissolved: May 2007
- Merged into: TDP
- Ideology: Social democracy
- Political position: Left-wing

The Communal Liberation Party (Turkish: Toplumcu Kurtuluş Partisi, TKP) was a left-wing political party in Northern Cyprus.

== History ==
The TKP was established in 1976 by Alpay Durduran. It won six of the 40 seats in the 1976 elections to the National Council, and 13 seats in the 1981 elections. In the 1985 elections, the party was reduced to ten seats, as the National Council became the Assembly of the Republic and was increased in size to 50 seats.

In the 1990 elections, the TKP allied with the Republican Turkish Party and the New Dawn Party to run as the Party for Democratic Struggle. After losing the elections to the ruling National Unity Party, TKP MPs boycotted the Assembly, claiming that Turkey had put money into the election campaign to support the government.

In the 1993 elections, the party won five seats, and it gained a further two seats in the 1998 elections. For the 2003 elections the party ran as part of the Peace and Democracy Movement, which won six seats. The TKP then ran independently in the 2005 elections, but failed to win a seat.

In May 2007, it merged with the Peace and Democracy Movement to form the Communal Democracy Party.
