= Rauf Denktaş =

Founder and first president of Northern Cyprus (served 1983–2005)

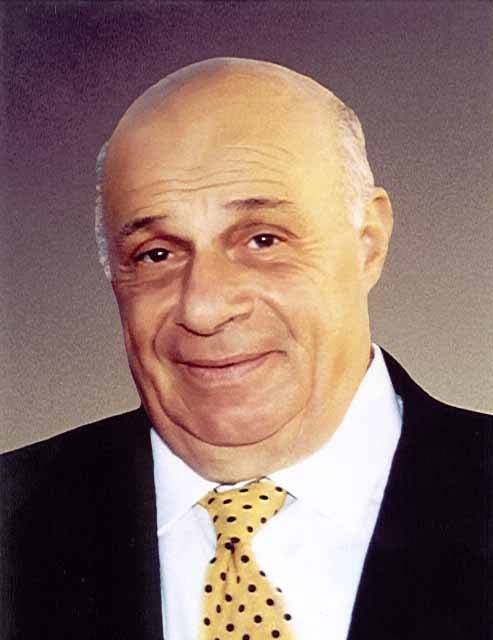

1st President of Northern Cyprus
- In office 25 April 1990 – 24 April 2005
- Prime Minister: Derviş Eroğlu; Hakkı Atun; Derviş Eroğlu; Mehmet Ali Talat
- Preceded by: Hakkı Atun (acting)
- Succeeded by: Mehmet Ali Talat
- In office 15 November 1983 – 15 March 1990
- Prime Minister: Mustafa Çağatay; Nejat Konuk; Derviş Eroğlu
- Preceded by: Office established
- Succeeded by: Hakkı Atun (acting)

President of the Turkish Federated State of Cyprus
- In office 13 February 1975 – 15 November 1983

Vice President of Cyprus
- In office 18 February 1973 – 15 July 1974
- President: Makarios III
- Preceded by: Fazıl Küçük
- Succeeded by: Vacant

Personal details
- Born: 27 January 1924 Paphos, British Cyprus
- Died: 13 January 2012 (aged 87) North Nicosia, Northern Cyprus
- Party: National Unity Party
- Spouse: Aydın Denktaş
- Children: 6, including Serdar (3 predeceased him)
- Education: The English School, Nicosia
- Alma mater: Lincoln's Inn
- Occupation: Politician; statesman; political writer
- Profession: Barrister
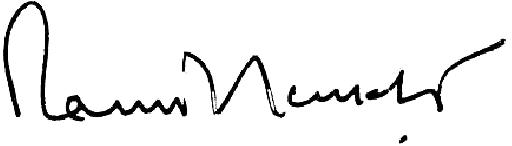
- Signature

Rauf Raif Denktaş (Note: Transliterated as Rauf Denktash in English) (Note: Turkish: [ɾaːˈuf ˈdeɲctaʃ]) (27 January 1924 – 13 January 2012) was a Turkish Cypriot politician, barrister and jurist who served as the founding president of Northern Cyprus. He occupied this position as the president of the Turkish Republic of Northern Cyprus between the declaration of the de facto state by Denktaş in 1983 and 2005, as the president of the Turkish Federated State of Cyprus between 1975 and 1983 and as the president of the Autonomous Turkish Cypriot Administration between 1974 and 1975. He was also elected in 1973 as the Vice President of the Republic of Cyprus.

== Early life and career ==
Denktaş was born in Paphos to Turkish Cypriot parents, judge Raif Mehmet Bey and Emine Hanim. He graduated from The English School, Nicosia in Cyprus. Following his graduation he worked as a translator in Famagusta after that as a court clerk and then as a teacher for one year in the English School. He later went to Istanbul and London, training first as a teacher and then as a barrister at Lincoln's Inn. He graduated in 1947 and returned home to practice law.

In 1948 Denktaş served as a member of the Consultative Assembly in search of self-government for Cyprus and became a member of the Turkish Affairs Committee. He was a crown prosecutor 1949–1958.

== 1957–1999 ==
In 1957, Denktaş played the lead role in the founding of the Turkish Resistance Organization (TMT), which was formed to resist EOKA's struggle to proclaim Enosis (union with Greece) and worked for the partition of Cyprus. In 1958, he attended the U.N. General Assembly on behalf of the Turkish-Cypriots, and in December of that year he advised the Turkish Government on the rights of Turkish Cypriots during the preparation of the London and Zurich Agreements (signed 19 February 1959). In 1960, Cyprus won independence from Britain, and the Republic of Cyprus was established. Denktaş was elected as the President of the Turkish Communal Chamber.

In November 1963 President Makarios gave for review to Turkey, Greece and Britain a document with a series of constitutional amendments designed to loosen the acquired rights of Turkish Cypriots in the name of "the workings of the state". Then the paramilitary action against the Turks began in December 1963, after which Turkish-Cypriots forcefully withdrew from government. Upon these events, Denktaş went to Ankara for consultations with the Turkish government. His reentry to the island was prohibited by the Greek-Cypriot leadership in years 1964–68 due to his involvement with TMT. In the 1973 vice presidential elections he replaced Fazıl Küçük.

After the 15 July 1974 Greek ultra-nationalist military coup in Cyprus, fearing for the safety of the Turkish Cypriot population, Turkey unilaterally invaded by landing troops on the north coast of Cyprus. During the military operation, the dictatorship led by Nikos Sampson fell and political wrangling began. After three weeks, Turkey continued to advance military operation. The Turkish Army took control of 37% of the island by the time it completed its second advance on 14 August 1974 and reached Famagusta. Denktaş was subsequently elected speaker of the legislature in 1975, and then President of the Turkish Federated State of Cyprus in 1976 and for a second term in 1981.

He played a key role in the 1983 Unilateral Declaration of Independence of the Turkish Republic of Northern Cyprus, and was elected as the President of the TRNC in 1985, 1990, 1995, and 2000.

The TRNC has not been recognised by any state other than Turkey. Denktaş had been the chief negotiator of Turkish Cypriots in the United Nations sponsored peace talks since 1968.

== Later career ==
By 2000, the desire of both Cyprus and Turkey to join the European Union led to renewed efforts to reach a settlement. In 2002 there were large demonstrations in northern Cyprus by Turkish Cypriots demanding reunification of the island, which would give them EU citizenship when Cyprus joined the EU in 2004.

In February 2004 Denktaş embarked on a new round of UN sponsored talks with the Greek Cypriots, aimed at re-uniting Cyprus. Ultimately, as did the Greek Cypriot President Tassos Papadopoulos, he opposed the final version of the settlement proposal drafted under the authority of the UN Secretary General Kofi Annan (the Annan Plan), which was voted on by the two Cypriot communities in a referendum on 24 April 2004. The plan was accepted by 65% of the Turkish community, but was rejected by a vast majority of the Greeks.

On 14 May 2004, Denktaş announced he would not be standing for a fifth term as President of the TRNC in the next election. His tenure as President came to an end following the 17 April 2005 election of Mehmet Ali Talat, who formally assumed office on 25 April.

== Personal life and awards ==
Denktaş's favourite pastimes included photography and writing. His photographs have been exhibited in the United States, the United Kingdom, Australia, Italy, some of the former republics of the Soviet Union, Poland, France, Austria and Turkey. He has written about fifty books in English and Turkish. Between the years 1949 and 1957 he wrote many articles for the newspaper Halkın Sesi ("Voice of the People"), published by Fazıl Küçük, the first Vice President of the Republic of Cyprus.

Denktaş has been the recipient of many awards and honorary doctorates given by various universities in Turkey, Northern Cyprus and the United States. He was married to Aydın Denktaş (1933–2019) for 63 years and had three sons and three daughters. He lost a daughter at the age of three, one son, Raif in a traffic accident and another son in a tonsillectomy. His surviving son Serdar Denktaş is also a politician, and as of 2019, leader of the Turkish Cypriot Democratic Party.

== Illness, death and funeral ==
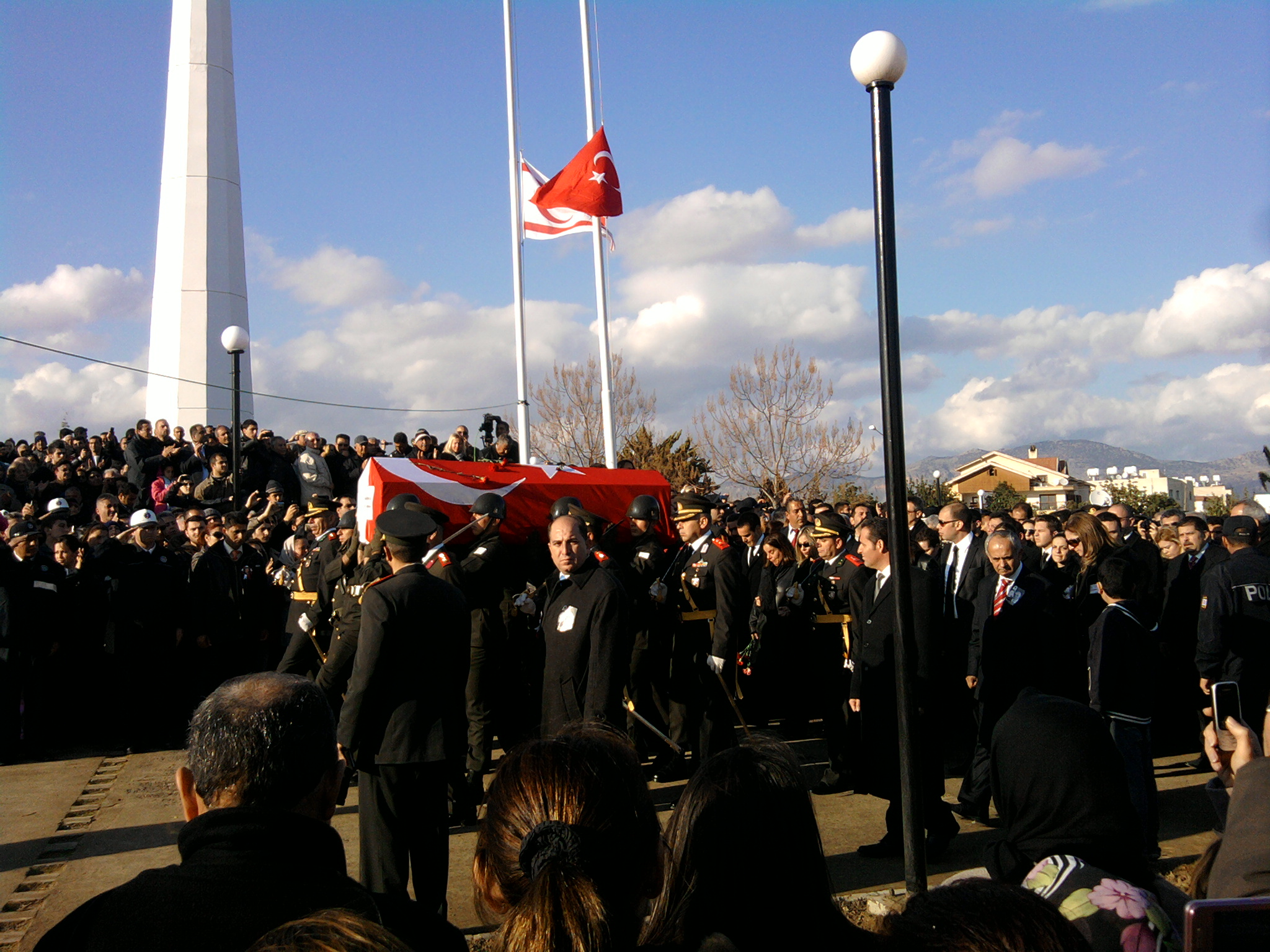
Funeral of Denktaş

Denktaş's health gradually deteriorated throughout the 2000s. He had a heart condition and on 25 May 2011 suffered a stroke. He died on 13 January 2012 of multiple organ failure at the Near East University Hospital in Nicosia. Northern Cyprus declared seven days' mourning, while Turkey declared five days'. His funeral was held on 17 January, with thousands of attendees. He was buried in the Cumhuriyet Park ("Park of the Republic").

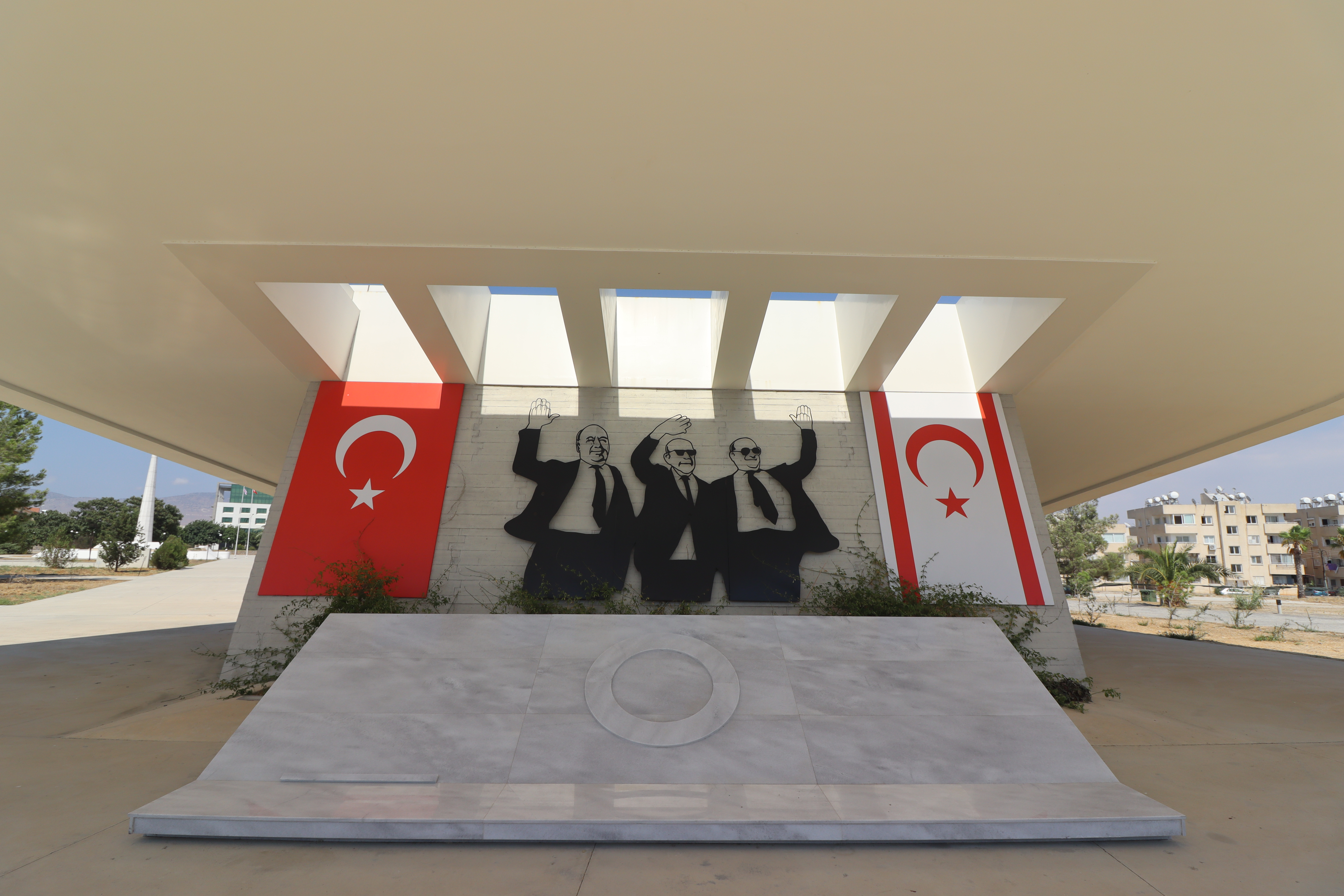
Rauf Raif Denktaş Mausoleum and Museum in Cumhuriyet Park, whose construction was unfinished, 2022.

== Books by Denktaş ==
- Saadet Sırları – Secrets of Happiness, 1941
- Ateşsiz Cehennem – Hell without Fire, 1944
- Criminal Cases, 1953–54
- A Handbook of Criminal Cases, 1955
- 12'ye 5 Kala – 5 to 12, 1964–66
- The Cyprus Problem, 1968
- The Akritas Plan, 1968
- A Short Discourse on Cyprus, 1972
- Gençlerle Başbaşa – Alone with Youngsters, 1981
- The Cyprus Triangle, 1982
- Gençlerle Hasbihal – Conversation with the Youth, 1982
- Cyprus Problem in a Nutshell, 1983
- Gençlere Öğütler – Advice to the Youth, 1985
- Kadın ve Dünya – Woman and The World, 1985
- Kuran'dan İlhamlar – Inspiration from The Qur'an, 1986
- İmtihan Dünyası – A World of Examination, 1986
- Yarınlar İçin – For Tomorrow, 1986
- UN Speeches on Cyprus, 1986
- Seçenekler ve Kıbrıs Türkleri – The Options and The Turkish Cypriots, 1986
- Cyprus, An Indictment and Defence, 1987
- The Cyprus Problem 23rd Year, 1987
- My Vision for Cyprus, 1988
- Atatürk, Din ve Laiklik – Atatürk, Religion and Laïcité, 1989
- Gençlerle Sohbet – Discussion with Youth, 1990
- Kıbrıs'ta Bitmeyen Kavga – Unending Fight in Cyprus, 1991
- Kıbrıs Davamız – Our Cyprus Issue, 1991
- İlk Altı Ay – The First Six Months, 1991
- What is the Cyprus Problem, 1991
- A Challenge on Cyprus, 1990–91
- Denktaş As A Photographer, Images From Northern Cyprus, 1991
- The Cyprus Problem and the Remedy, 1992, Nicosia (Lefkoşa)
- From My Album, 1992
- O Günler – Those days, 1993, Nicosia
- Images From Northern Cyprus, 1993
- Vizyon – The Vision, 1994, Nicosia
- Kapılar – The Doors, 1995, Nicosia
- Observations on the Cyprus Dispute, 1996
- Kıbrıs Meselesinde Son Durum – The Latest Situation in Cyprus Issue, 1996, Nicosia
- Rum Yunan İkilisi: İstenmeyen Cumhuriyetten Nereye? – Cypriot Greek Duo: Where to from the Unwanted Republic, 1996, Nicosia
- Karkot Deresi – Karkot Stream, 1996
- Rauf Denktaş'ın Hatıraları, 1964–74, I. cilt (1964) – Memoirs of Rauf Denktaş, 1964–74, volume I (1964), 1996
- Rauf Denktaş'ın Hatıraları, 1964–74, II. cilt (1965), 1997
- Rauf Denktaş'ın Hatıraları, 1964–74, III. cilt (1966), 1997
- Rauf Denktaş'ın Hatıraları, 1964–74, IV. cilt (1967), 1997
- Rauf Denktaş'ın Hatıraları, 1964–74, V. cilt (1968), 1997
- Rauf Denktaş'ın Hatıraları, 1964–74, VI. cilt (1969), 1997
- Rauf Denktaş'ın Hatıraları, 1964–74, VII. cilt (1970), 1997
- Kalbimin Sesi – The voice of my heart, 1997
- In Search of Justice, 1997
- Rauf Denktaş'ın Hatıraları, 1964–74, VIII. cilt (1971–72), 1998
- Rauf Denktaş'ın Hatıraları, 1964–74, IX. cilt (1973–74), 1999
- Hatıralar, Toplayış, X. cilt – Memoirs, Putting It Together, vol X, 2000

Note: The translations of the titles in Turkish is not necessarily the actual English title

== Notes ==
Political offices
Preceded by Fazıl Küçük	Leader of the Turkish Cypriots; 18 February 1973 – 24 April 2005	Succeeded by Mehmet Ali Talat
New title	President of the Turkish Republic of Northern Cyprus; 1983–2005	Succeeded by Mehmet Ali Talat
