= John Robert Hilton =

British academic, architect and intelligence officer

- Born: 5 January 1908; Northwood, Middlesex, England
- Died: 20 April 1994 (aged 86); Box, Wiltshire, England
- Education: Corpus Christi College, Oxford; Bartlett School of Architecture
- Military career
- Allegiance: United Kingdom
- Branch: British Army
- Service years: 1941–1947
- Rank: Captain
- Unit: Royal Engineers
- Conflicts: Second World War

John Robert Hilton, CMG (5 January 1908 – 20 April 1994) was a British academic, architect and intelligence officer. From 1934 to 1936, he served as the first Director of the Department of Antiquities, Cyprus. He then worked as an architect, served in the British Army during the Second World War, and served as a career intelligence officer with MI6 until he retired.

== Early life and education ==
Hilton was born on 5 January 1908 in Northwood, Middlesex, England, to Oscar and Louisa Hilton; his father was a medical doctor. He was educated at Marlborough College, then an all-boys private boarding school: he was there at the same time as Anthony Blunt, the future art historian and spy for the Soviet Union. He studied classics at Corpus Christi College, Oxford, graduating with a first class honours Bachelor of Arts (BA) degree; as per tradition, his BA was promoted to a Master of Arts (MA Oxon) degree. He studied architecture at Bartlett School of Architecture and University College London, graduating with a diploma and achieving Associateship of the Royal Institute of British Architects (ARIBA).

== Academic and architectural career ==
In August 1934, Hilton was appointed as the first Director of the newly established Department of Antiquities, Cyprus. He had also been offered the post of lecturer in philosophy at the University of Birmingham, but he chose to go to Cyprus instead. Letters of correspondence between Hilton and the Antiquities Officer for Famagusta, Theophilus Amin Halil Mogabgab, exist in the archives of King's College London. Inexperienced in government administration, confusion over his exact role, and often sidelined by Rupert Gunnis, the inspector of antiquities for the Cyprus Museum, Hilton tended his resignation in July 1935 to take effect on 31 December 1935. His departure was announced by the press as follows: "The Colonial Secretary has appointed Mr. Hubert Megaw, Assistant Director of the British School of Archaeology in Athens as Director of Antiquities in Cyprus in succession to Mr. John Robert Hilton, who has resigned."

In 1936 he returned to England, where he practised architecture under E.S. and A. Robinson, and in private practice between 1936 and 1941.

== Second World War and MI6 ==
On 19 April 1941, Hilton was commissioned in the British Army's Royal Engineers as a second lieutenant. He relinquished his army commission on 9 April 1947, and was granted the honorary rank of captain.

In 1943, Hilton was transferred to the Foreign Office. He was sent out to Istanbul in 1944, then moving to Athens in 1945 as second secretary. He did another tour in Istanbul as first secretary from 1956 to 1960, but otherwise spent his career with the Secret Intelligence Service (SIS) in London. In the 1965 Queen's Birthday Honours, he was appointed Companion of the Order of St Michael and St George (CMG) for his work as an intelligence officer.

== Personal life ==
In 1933 he married Margaret Stephens, together they have one son and two daughters, one which predeceased him and Jennifer Hilton. His brother is artist Roger Hilton.

He was a Member of the Council of the National Schizophrenia Fellowship, in the years 1977-81 and 1983–94, and again as President 1985-91.

Hilton died on 20 April 1994 in Box, Wiltshire, England.

== Publications ==
- Repairs to Ancient Monuments, Reports of the Department of Antiquities, Cyprus, 1935 (1936), 1.
- Mind and Analysis, memoir on Louis MacNeice, 1965
- A Camel Load of Woad, unpublished memoir

== See also ==
- George Jeffery
- Rupert Gunnis
