= Fortifications of Famagusta =

Defensive walls around the city of Famagusta in Cyprus

- Famagusta, Cyprus (Note: De jure part of Cyprus)
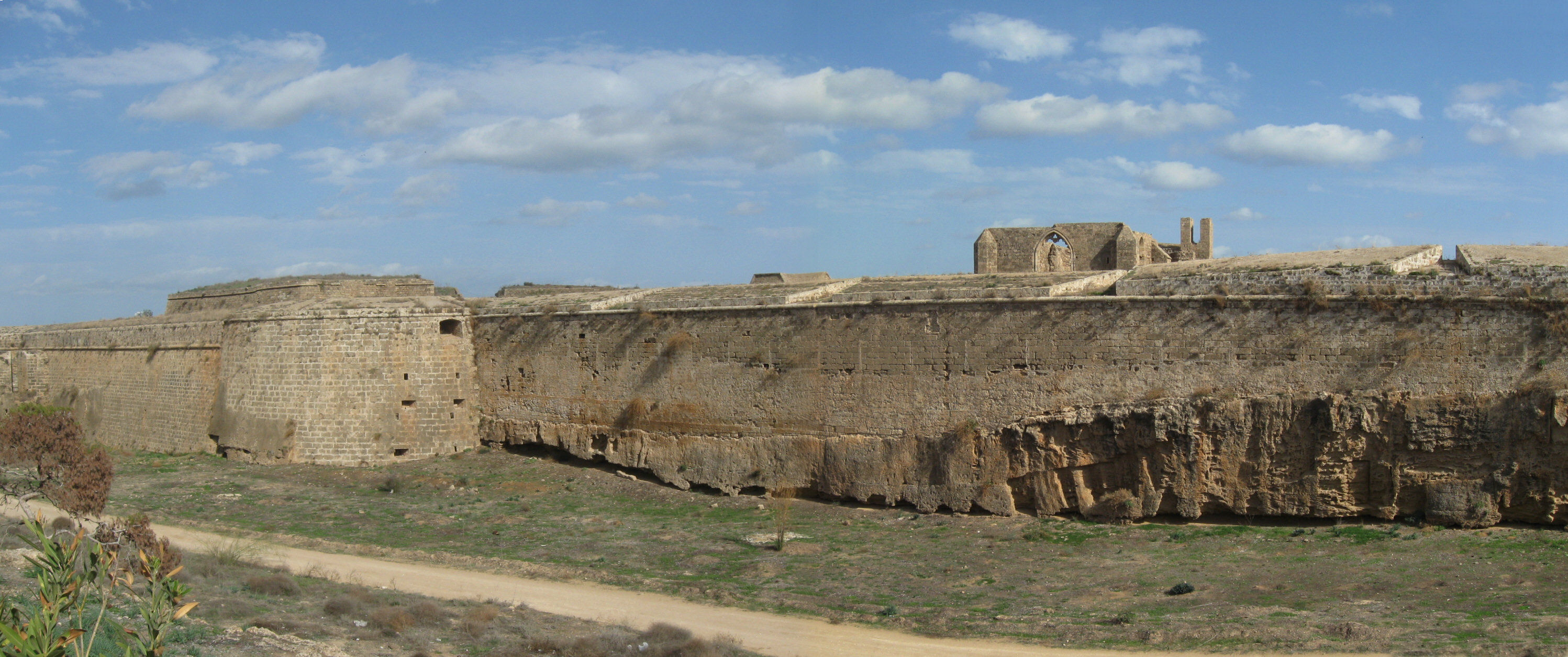
- San Luca Bastion

Site information
- Type: City wall
- Condition: Intact

Location
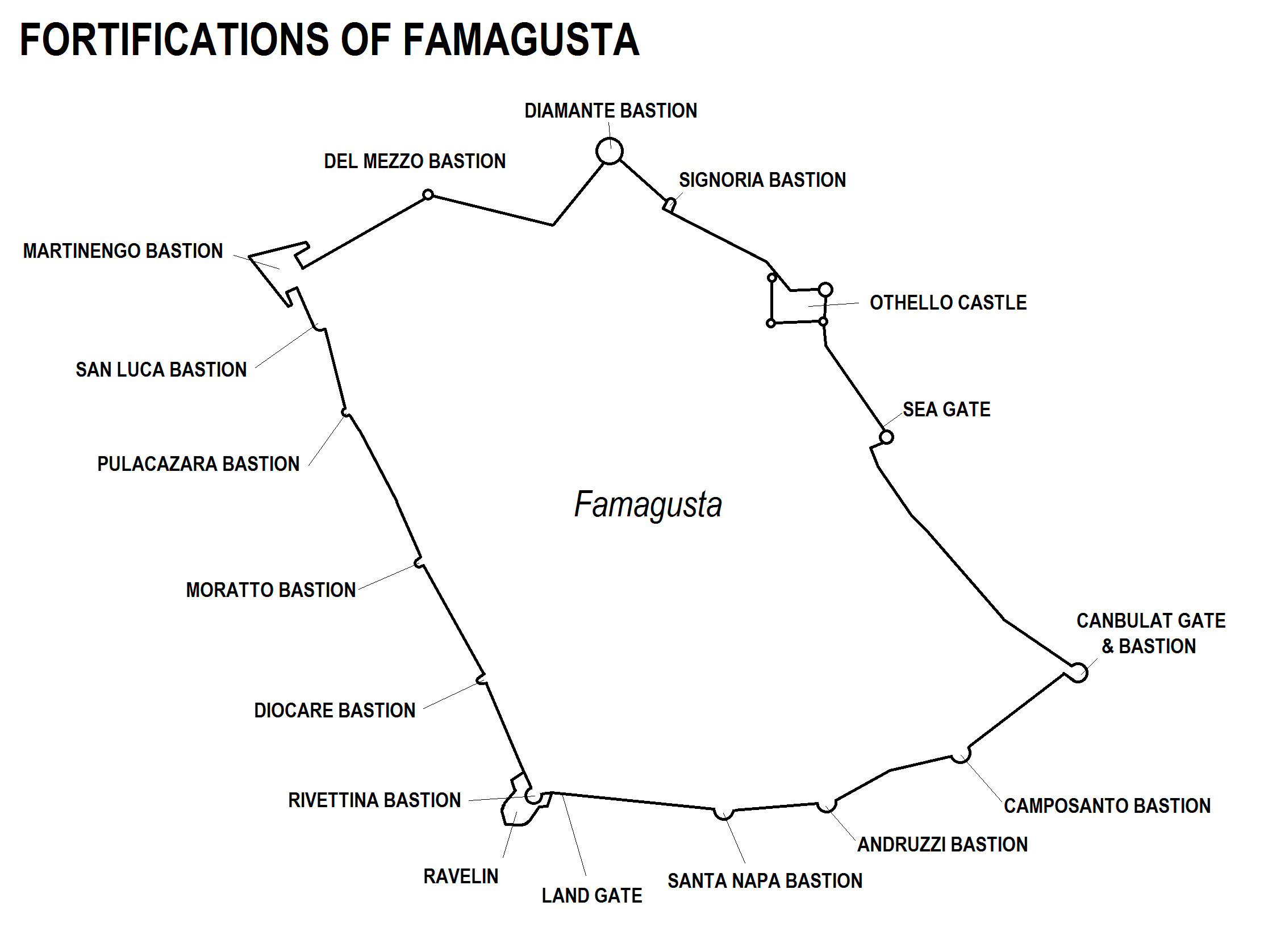
- Map of Famagusta's fortifications
- Coordinates: 35°7′41.2″N 33°56′6.8″E

Site history
- Built: 15th–16th centuries
- Built by: Kingdom of Cyprus
- Battles/wars: Siege of Famagusta

The fortifications of Famagusta are a series of defensive walls and other fortifications which surround the city of Famagusta in Northern Cyprus. The walls were built by the Kingdom of Cyprus in the 14th century, and redesigned by the Republic of Venice in 15th and 16th centuries. The fortifications of Famagusta withstood an 11-month siege before the city capitulated to the Ottoman Empire in August 1571.

== History ==
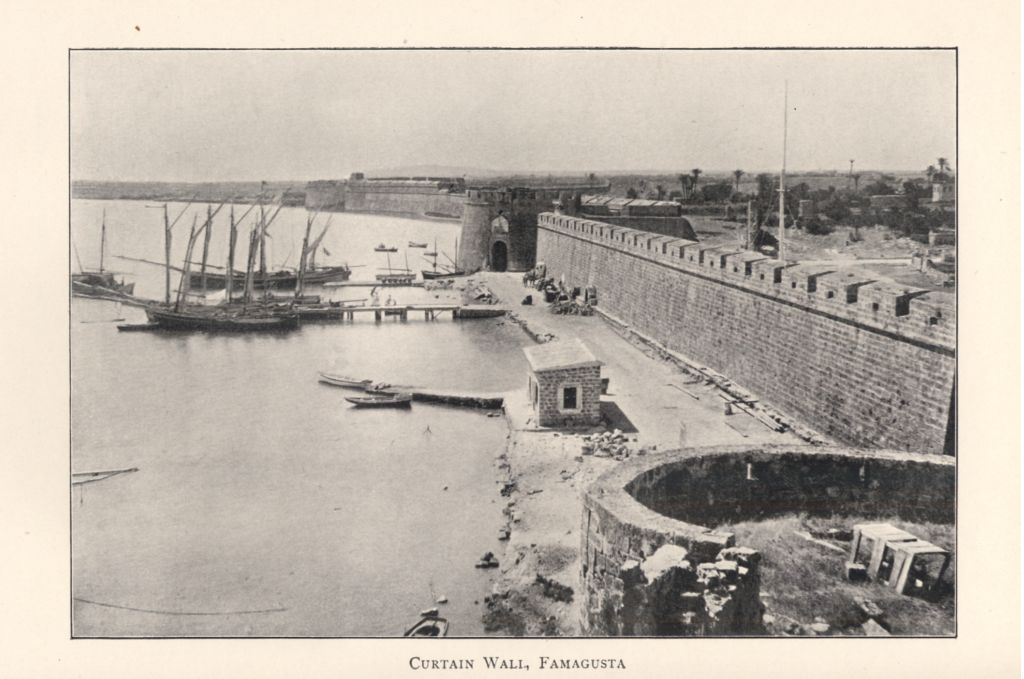
Curtain Wall, Famagusta (1900)

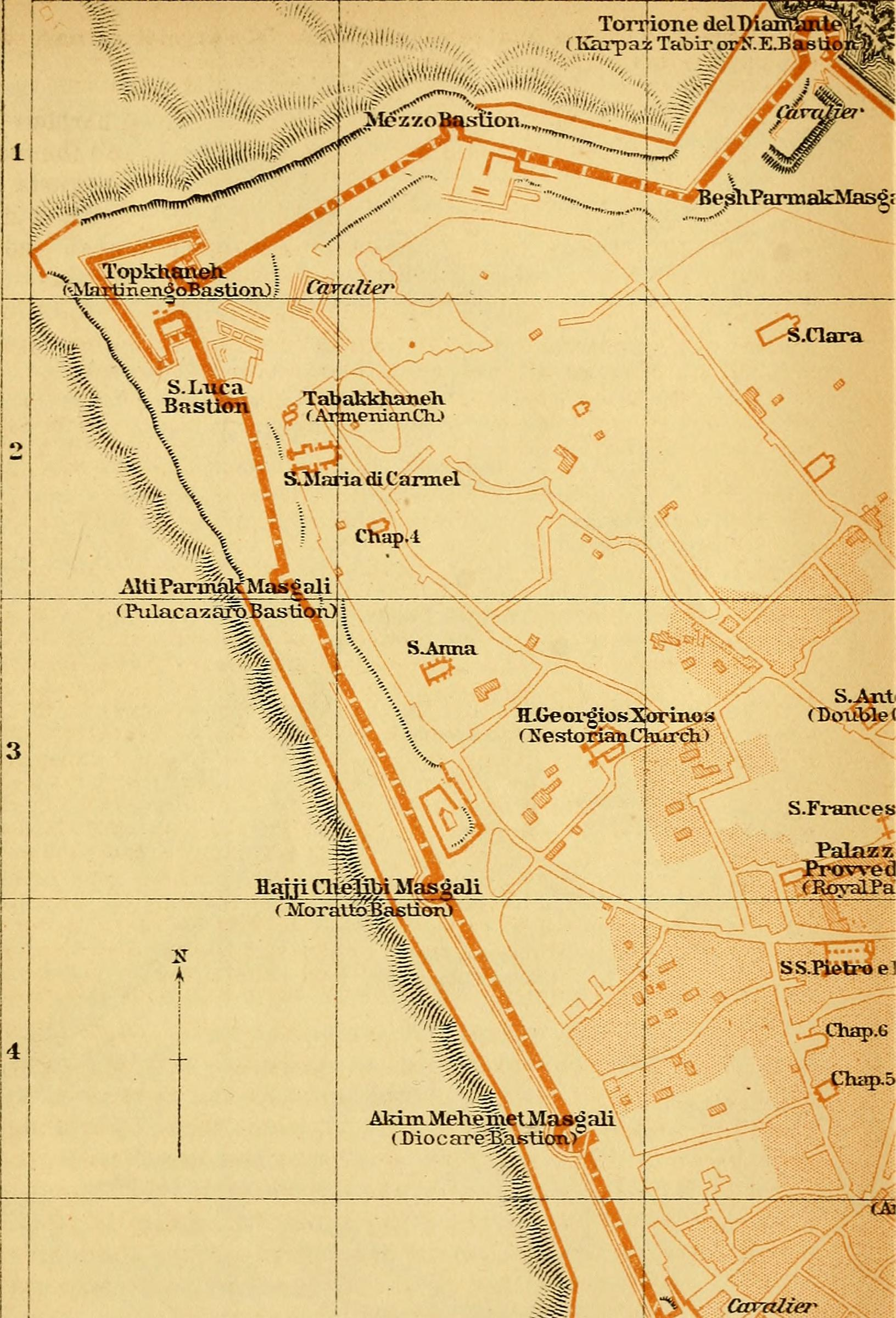
Walls of Famagusta (traveller's handbook, 1906)

=== Medieval period ===
In the 13th century, Famagusta's harbour was defended by a tower, and it is possible that some form of fortification existed earlier. In the 14th century, the Lusignans built Othello Castle to defend both the harbour and the town. Famagusta fell to the Genoese in 1373, and in 1489 it was taken over by the Republic of Venice along with the rest of Cyprus.

=== Venetian rule ===
While Famagusta was under Venetian rule, the city was essentially a military base. Othello Castle was modernized, and fortifications surrounding the city began to be built. The fortifications were designed by a number of military engineers, including Michele Sanmicheli and his nephew Giovanni Girolamo Sammichele. The latter arrived in Famagusta in around 1550, and designed the Martinengo Bastion, which served as a prototype for various other fortifications in Europe and America. He died in Famagusta in 1559, while the fortifications were still under construction.

The Fourth Ottoman–Venetian War broke out in 1570, when an Ottoman force invaded Cyprus and took control of most of the island within a few months. On 15 September, the Ottomans surrounded Famagusta, which was the last Venetian stronghold on the island, and began the Siege of Famagusta. The city held out until August 1571, when the Venetians asked for terms of surrender. Although terms were agreed and the inhabitants began to evacuate the city, at the surrender ceremony Lala Mustafa Pasha learned that some Muslim prisoners had been killed and he had the Venetian commander Marco Antonio Bragadin mutilated and flayed alive, and the remaining Christians in the city were massacred.

=== Ottoman rule to present day ===
The Ottomans repaired the damaged parts of the walls, but did not make any major alterations. The city began to expand outside its walls in the late Ottoman period, and this increased after Cyprus came under British rule.

Although many buildings within the old city of Famagusta are in a state of disrepair, the fortifications are still in relatively good condition.

== Layout ==
The fortifications of Famagusta consist of an enceinte which is surrounded by a rock-hewn ditch on the landward side, and the harbour on the seaward side. Like the fortifications of Rhodes, which were built by the Knights Hospitaller between the 14th and 16th centuries, the walls of Famagusta show the transition between medieval fortification and the bastioned fortifications of the early modern period.

Famagusta's city walls feature 14 bastions, two gates and the Othello Castle. There were originally two gates into the city through the fortifications, the Land Gate in the south-west corner and the Sea Gate (Porta del mare) by the port. The 14 bastions were named after Venetian families and are part of the Venetian fortifications that encircle the historic city center. These 14 bastions are;

- Martinengo Bastion (Çifte Mazgallar)
- San Luca Bastion
- Pulacazara Bastion
- Moratto Bastion
- Diocare Bastion
- Rivettina Bastion
- The Ravelin (Akkule)
- Santa Napa Bastion (Golden Bastion)
- Andruzzi Bastion (Water Bastion)
- Camposanto Bastion (Ringed Bastion)
- Canbulat Bastion (Arsenal)
- Signoria Bastion (Ringed Enclosure)
- Diamante Bastion (Karpaz Bastion)
- Del Mezzo Bastion
