= Othello Castle =

Castle in Cyprus

- Greek: Πύργος του Oθέλλου; Turkish: Othello Kulesi
- Part of the Fortifications of Famagusta
- Famagusta, Northern Cyprus
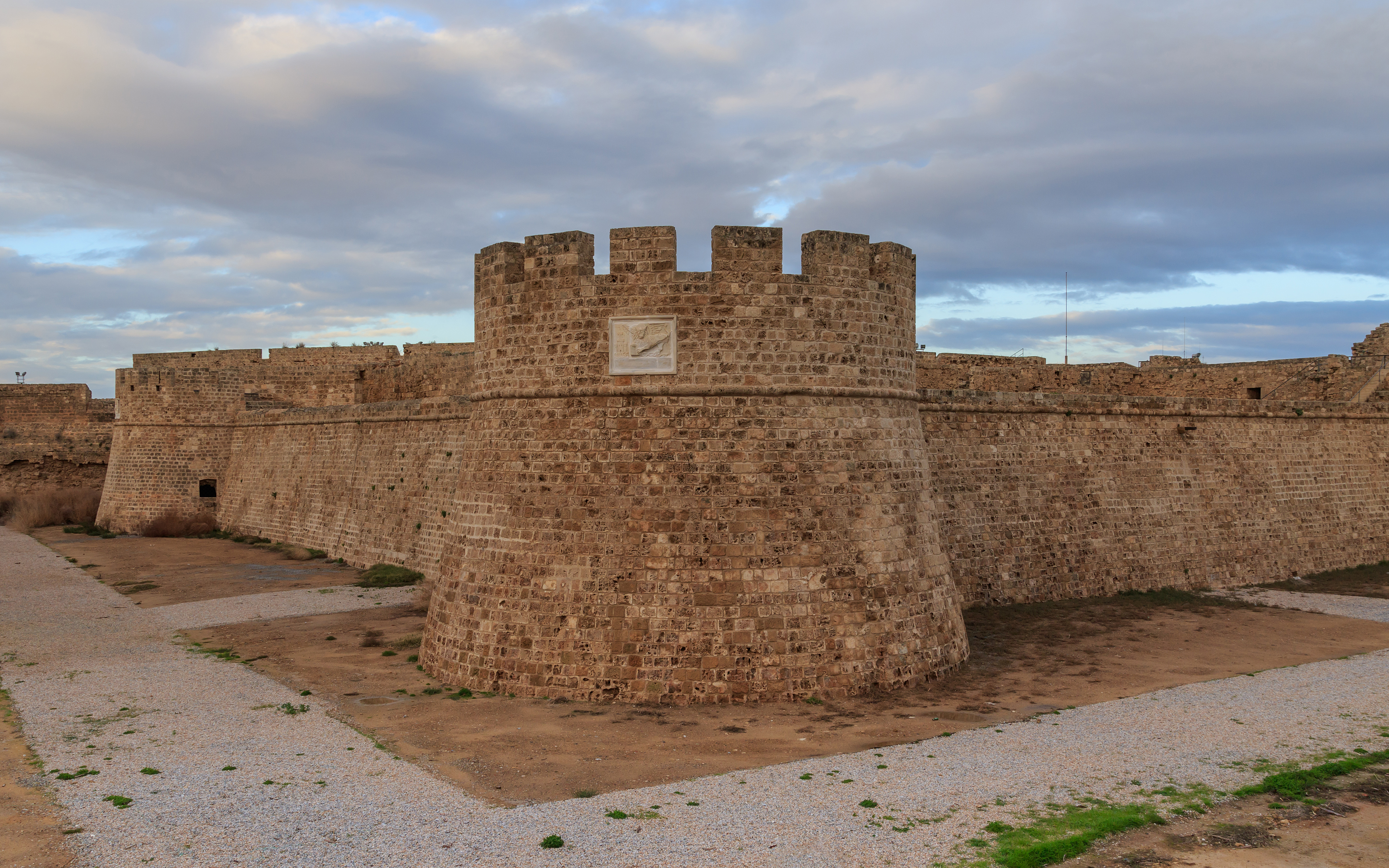
- Othello Castle

Site information
- Type: Castle
- Condition: Intact

Location
- Coordinates: 35°7′39.7″N 33°56′35.7″E

Site history
- Built: 14th century late 15th century (modifications)
- Built by: Kingdom of Cyprus; Republic of Venice (modifications)
- Materials: Sandstone

Othello Castle (Greek: Πύργος του Oθέλλου, Turkish: Othello Kalesi), also known as Othello's Tower, is a castle in Famagusta, in the eastern part of Cyprus. It was built by the Lusignans in the 14th century, and was later modified by the Venetians. The modern name of the castle comes from a stage note in Shakespeare's play Othello.

== History ==
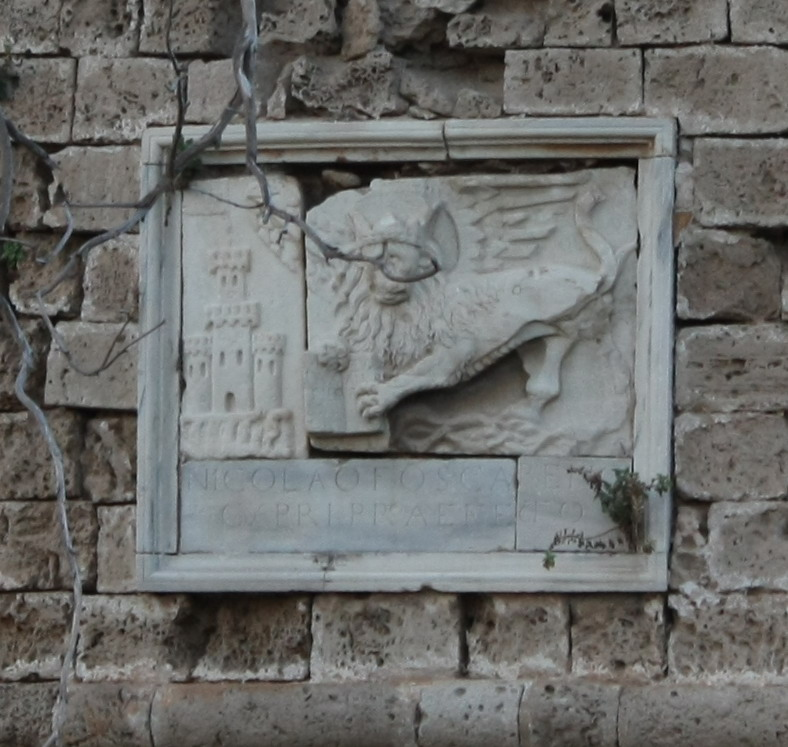
Relief of the Lion of St Mark on the walls of the castle

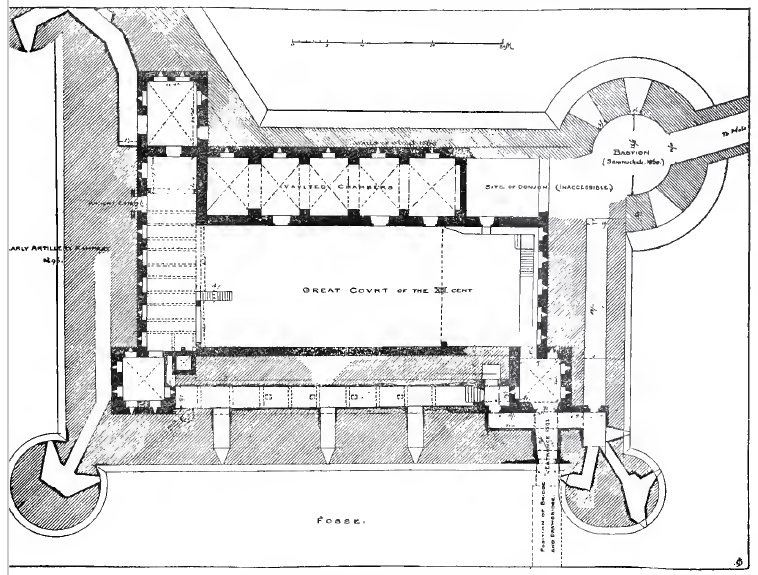
Ground plan 1918

Othello Castle was built in the 14th century by the Lusignans (who ruled the Kingdom of Cyprus) to protect the port against possible enemy attacks. It was also used as the main entrance to Famagusta. It used to be called "impenetrable fortress" due to it being nearly impossible to attack due to the very deep ditches surrounding it.

After Cyprus was sold to the Republic of Venice, the castle's square towers were replaced with circular ones to suit more modern artillery. After these modifications, a relief of the Lion of Saint Mark was engraved above the castle's main entrance. The name of Captain Nicolo Foscari, who directed the alterations to the castle, and the date 1492 are inscribed near the relief. Apparently Leonardo da Vinci advised the refurbishment in 1481. The castle gets its name from Shakespeare's play Othello, which is set in a harbour town in Cyprus.

In 1900, the castle's ditch was drained to reduce the risk of malaria.

The castle began to be restored in 2014, and it reopened to the public on 3 July 2015.

== Layout ==
The castle contains four circular towers. It contains a refectory and a dormitory, which were constructed during the Lusignan period. The castle's yard contains cannonballs left behind by the Spaniards and Ottomans.

== See also ==
- List of Crusader castles

== External References ==
Othello's Tower 3D
