= Medieval fortification =

Fortifications built during the middle ages

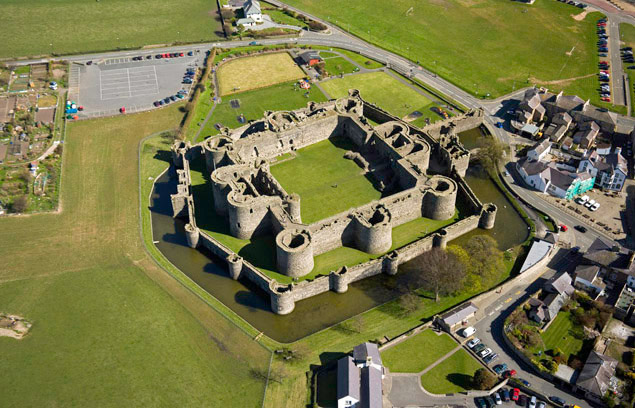
Beaumaris Castle in Wales was built in the late 13th century and is an example of concentric castles which developed in the late medieval period.

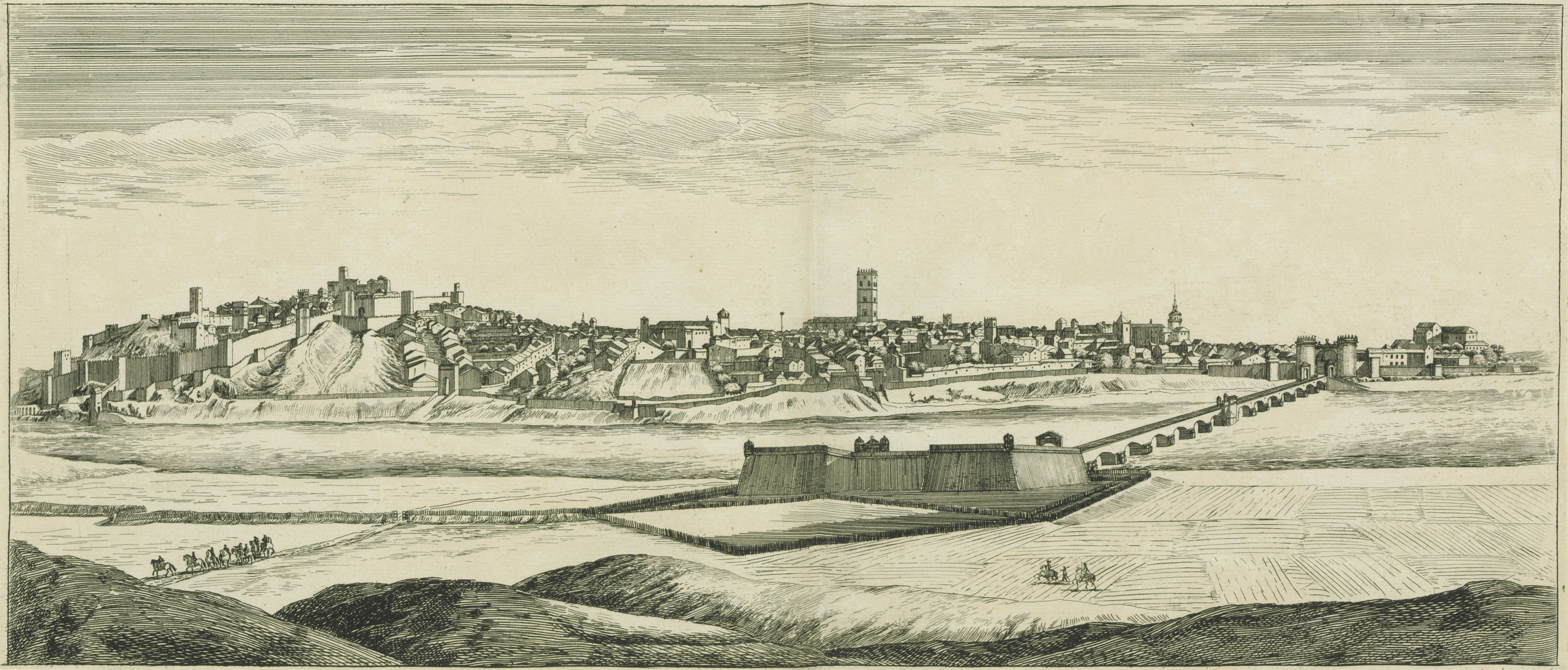
Badajoz

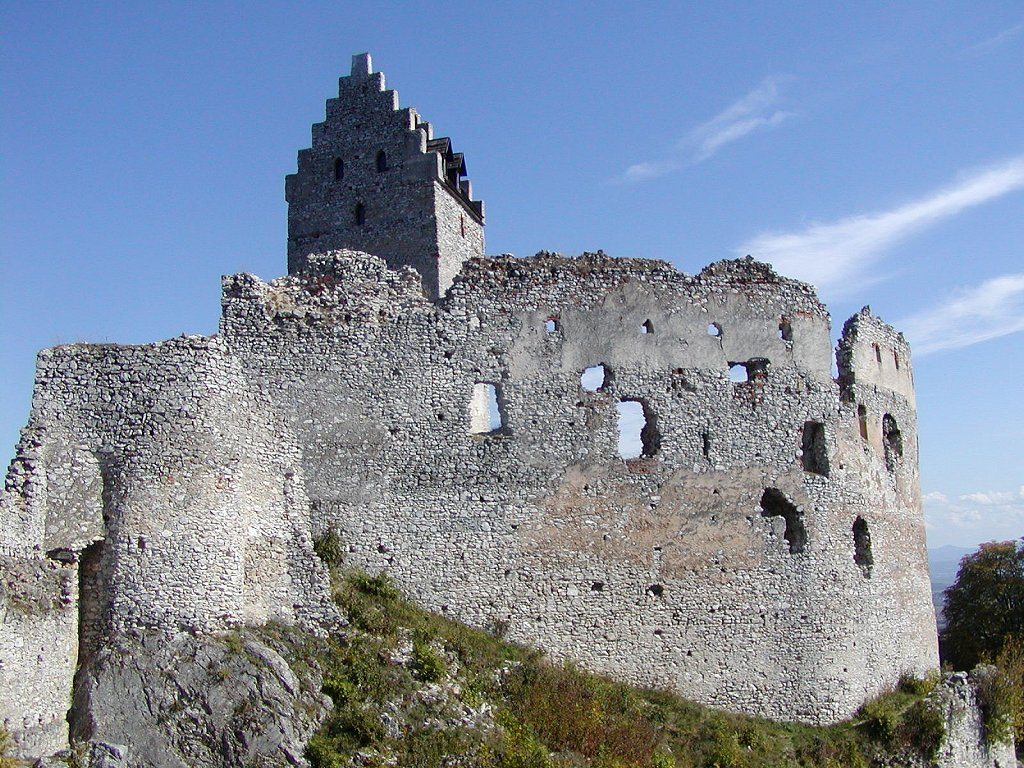
Castle of Topoľčany in Slovakia

Medieval fortification refers to military methods that cover the development of fortification construction and use in Europe, during the period roughly from the fall of the Western Roman Empire until the Renaissance. During this millennium, fortifications changed warfare and in turn were modified to suit new tactics, weapons, and siege techniques.

== Fortification types ==
=== Castles ===
The castle, defined by historian John Goodall as "the residence of a lord made imposing through the architectural trappings of fortification," was the archetypal medieval fortification. The combination of private elite residences with serious fortifications was not seen in European history outside the Middle Ages, and was inextricably linked to the feudal system. The castle developed in France around 900 AD, in the instability that followed the collapse of the Carolingian Empire, when lords wished to defend their own interests rather than relying on the state. Early earth-and-timber forms, such as the motte-and-bailey and ringwork, were superseded by more imposing and durable stone structures. Early stone castles generally had a central keep, or great tower, but in the later 12th century the defensive focus generally moved to the curtain wall, finding its ultimate expression in the concentric castles of the later 13th century.

=== Other fortified houses ===
Where financial limitations or the lack of serious military threats made the construction of a castle impossible or unnecessary, lesser lords and members of the gentry built other forms of fortified house. In more settled areas, a fortified manor house, such as may be seen in England from the later 13th century, gave the builder some protection and the status benefits of a castle without sacrificing domestic comfort. Fortified manor houses could also result from a previously peaceful area with unfortified houses descending into war. This happened at the Scottish border after the start of the Wars of Scottish Independence in 1296, when manors like Aydon Castle were hurriedly made defensible by adding curtain walls and blocking windows. Tower houses were a common response to living in unsettled areas like Scotland and Ireland, forming an imposing, secure and spatially efficient dwelling. The height of tower houses could be a source of competition, especially in urban areas, resulting in the fantastical skylines of towns like San Gimignano. When a tower house was too expensive, the inhabitant could build a smaller structure like a peel tower or even a bastle house, the latter little more than a sturdily-built farmhouse.

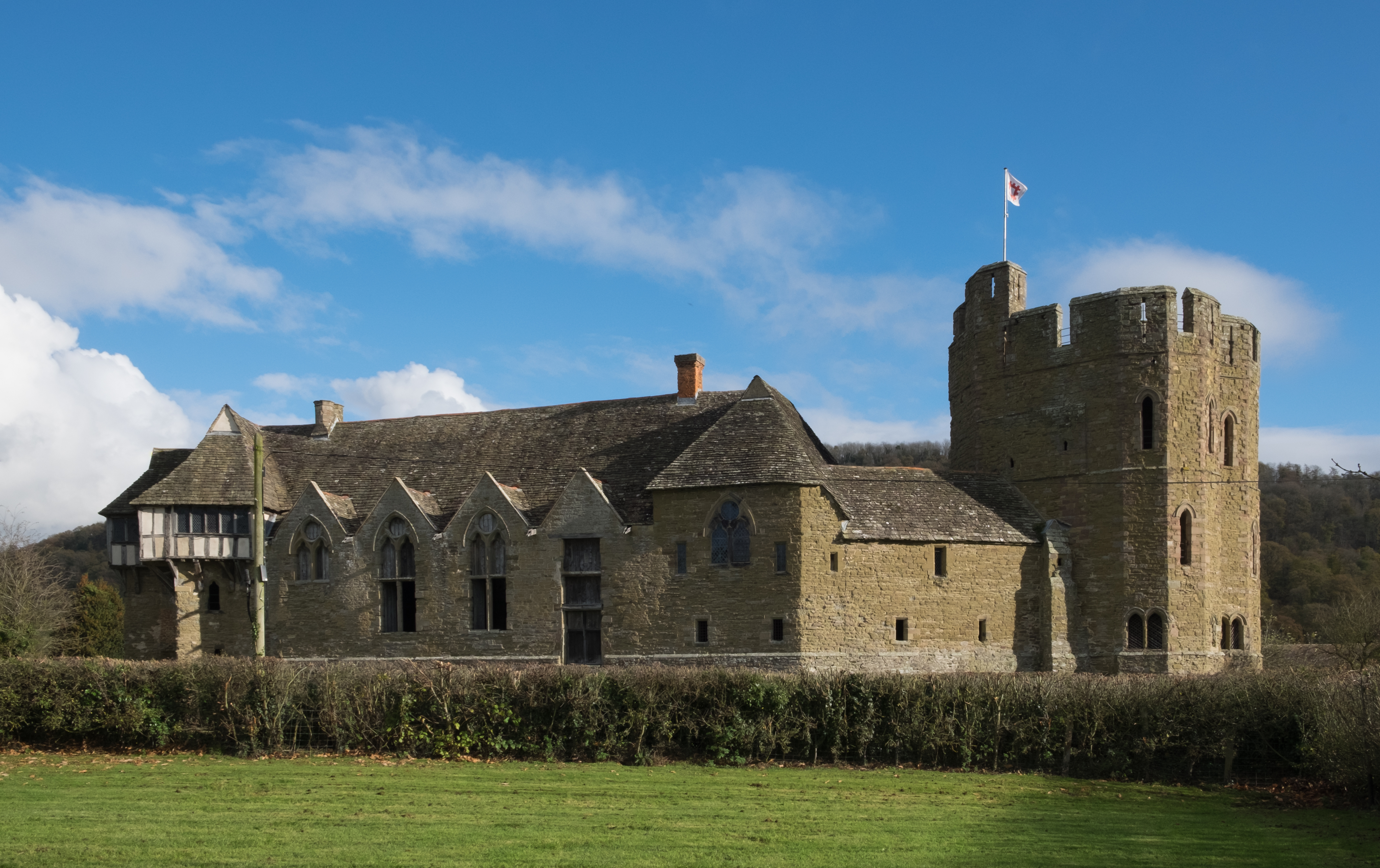
Stokesay Castle, England, a late 13th century fortified manor house

Aydon Castle, England. The defensive wall in the foreground was added after war broke out with Scotland.

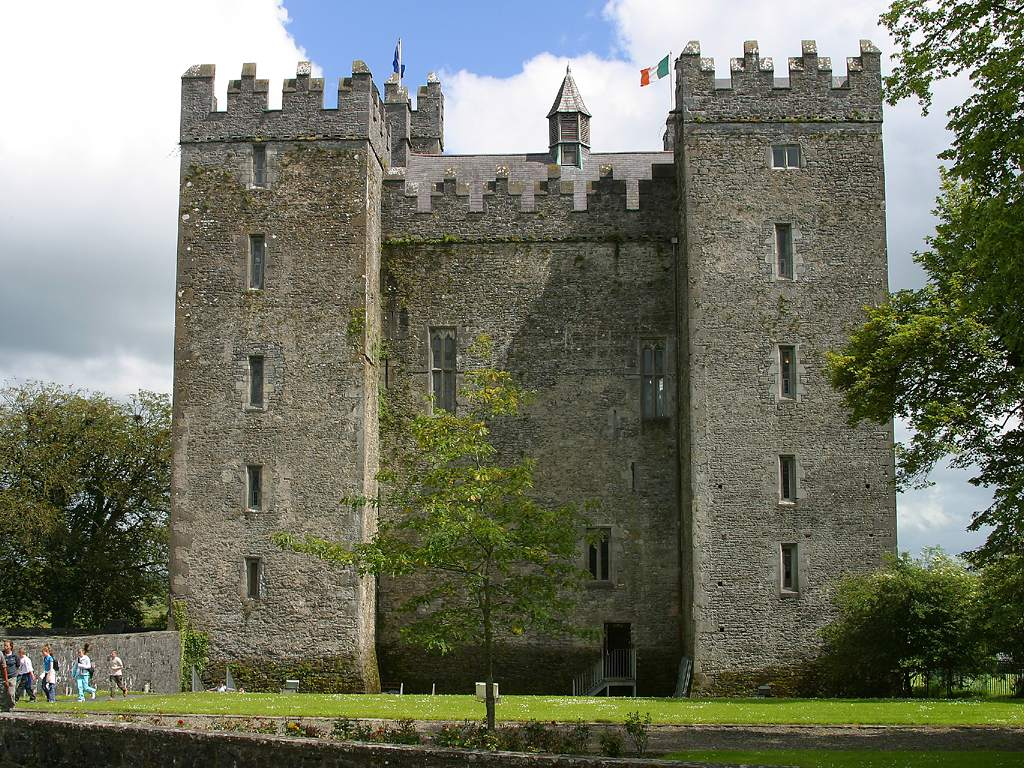
Bunratty Castle, Ireland, a very large tower house

Tower houses at San Gimignano, Italy.

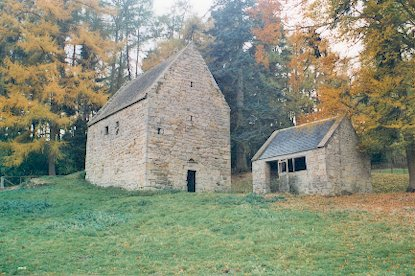
Woodhouses Bastle, England, a well-preserved bastle house.

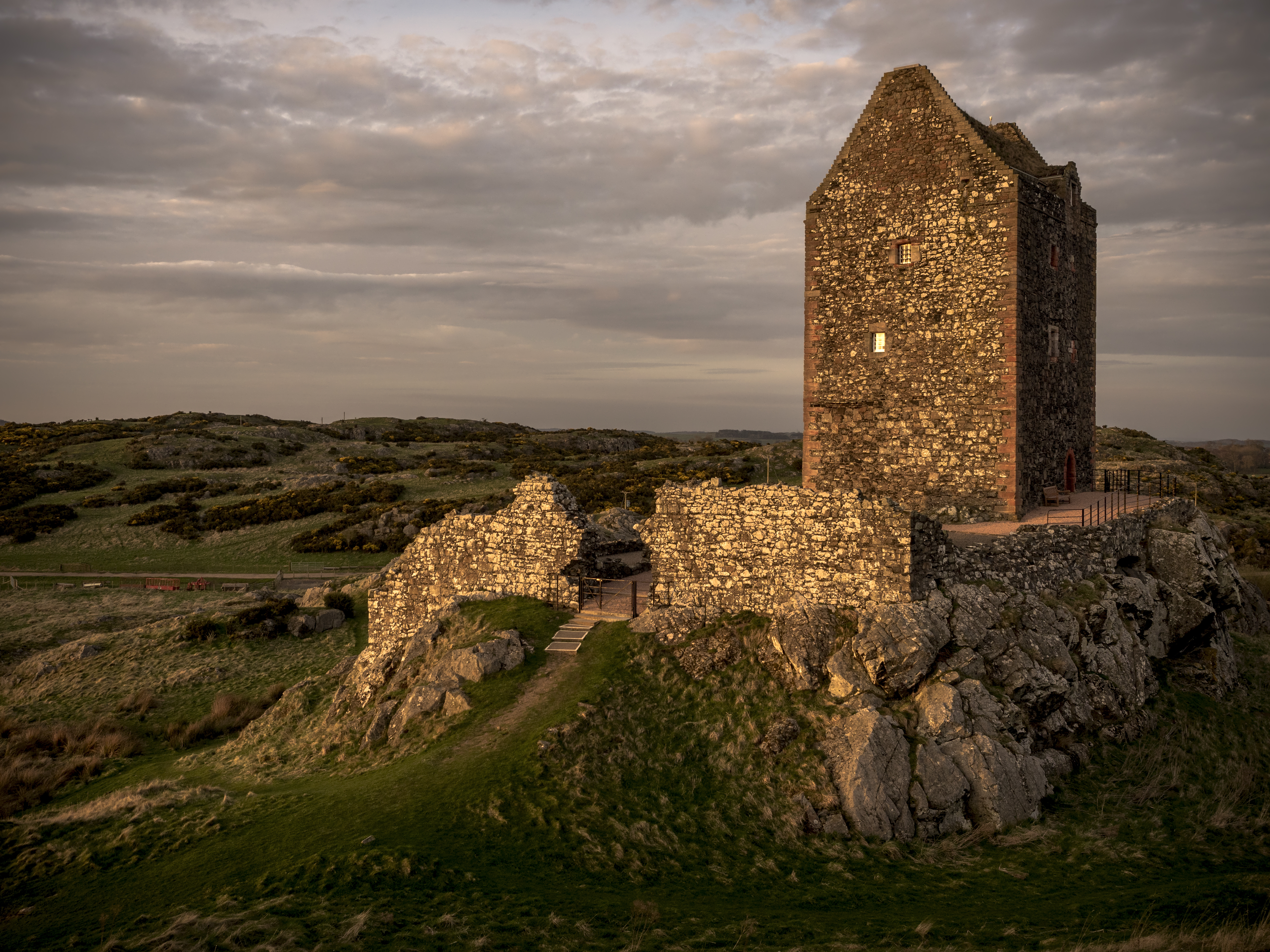
Smailholm Tower, Scotland, showing the remains of the external barmkin wall.

=== City walls ===
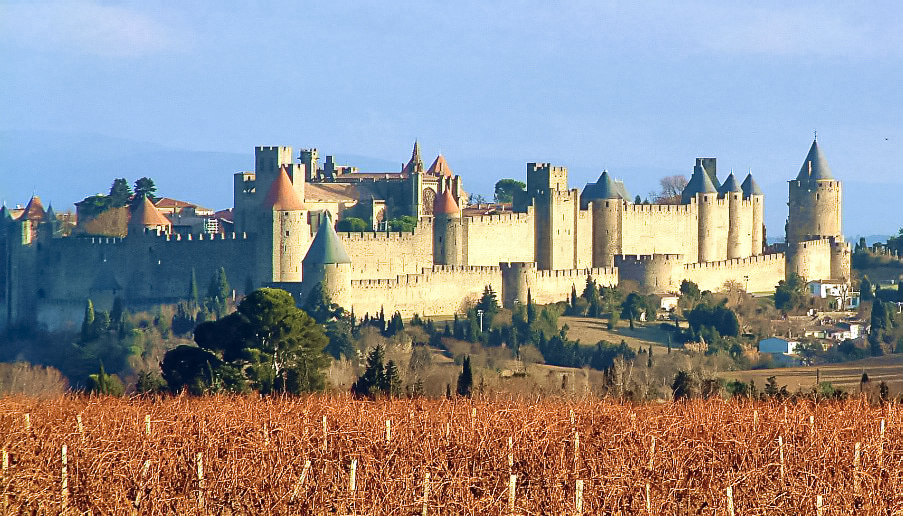
The concentric city walls of Carcassonne, France. The walls and some of the towers are Roman in origin, much extended.

Cities were generally walled, even where there was no military threat, as a status symbol and to enable toll collection. Many cities, such as London, retained their Roman fortifications, which were repaired and extended in the Middle Ages. Where Roman fortifications were not available, early construction was generally in earth and timber, usually later replaced with stone. This would have been the pattern of events in the Five Boroughs of the Danelaw in England. Fortified towns, or bastides, were used to support colonisation by the English and French, namely Edward I's annexation of north Wales and the French campaign against the Cathars in the Languedoc, forming the basis of settlement in hostile territory.

In many cases, the wall would have had an internal and an external pomoerium. This was a strip of clear ground immediately adjacent the wall. The word is from the late medieval, derived from the classical Latin post murum ("behind the wall"). An external pomoerium, stripped of bushes and building, gave defenders a clear view of what was happening outside and an unobstructed field of shot. An internal pomoerium gave ready access to the rear of the curtain wall to facilitate movement of the garrison to a point of need. By the end of the sixteenth century, the word had developed further in common use, into pomery.

=== Bridges ===
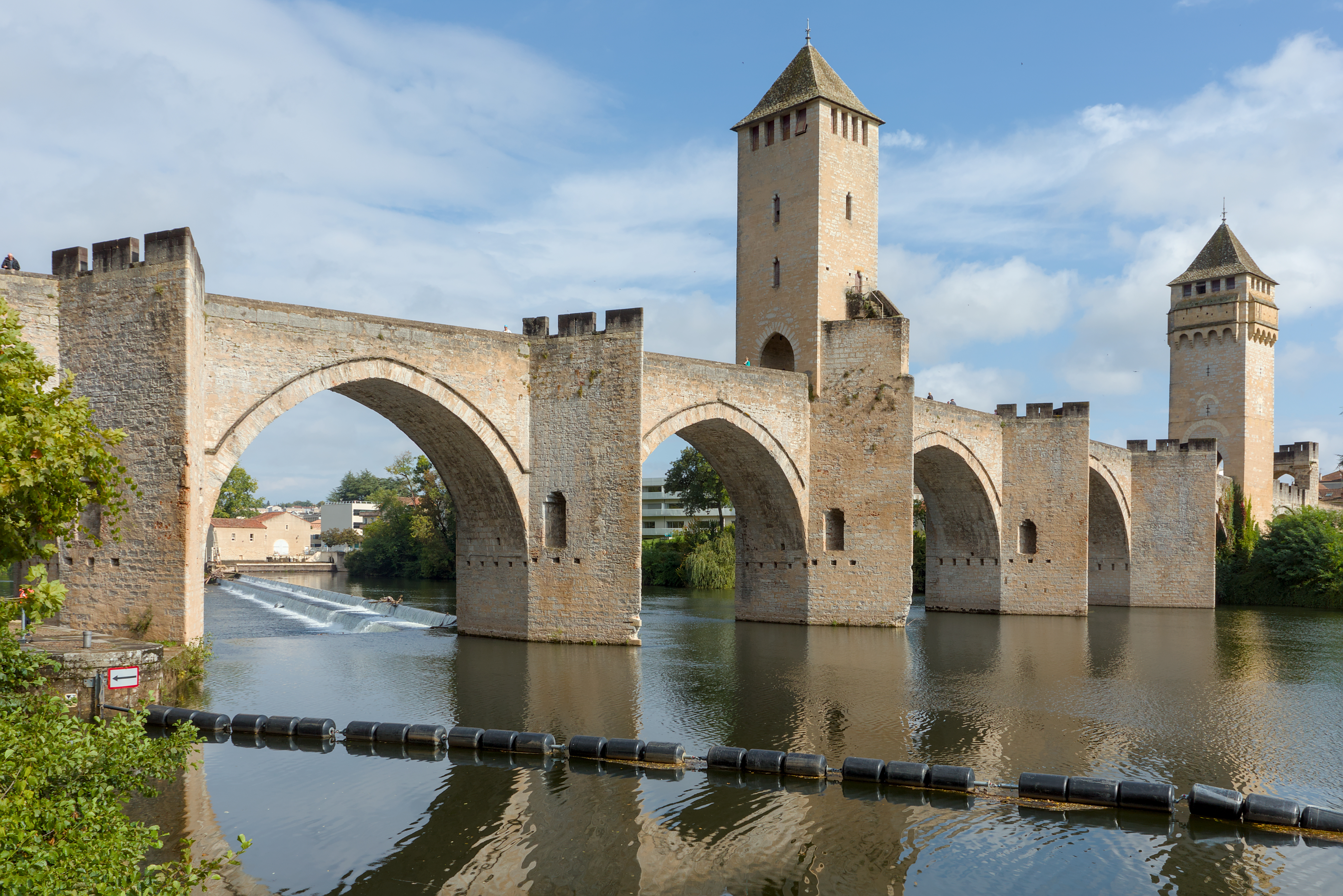
The Pont Valentré, Cahors, France, defended by three gate towers.

Bridges, particularly leading into towns, were often fortified with towers straddling the roadway. As these were an impediment to traffic, few have survived to the present, though the bridges that carried the towers often have, as at Durham. Occasionally the bridgehead was further defended with a tower or fort, as at Córdoba.

=== Harbours ===
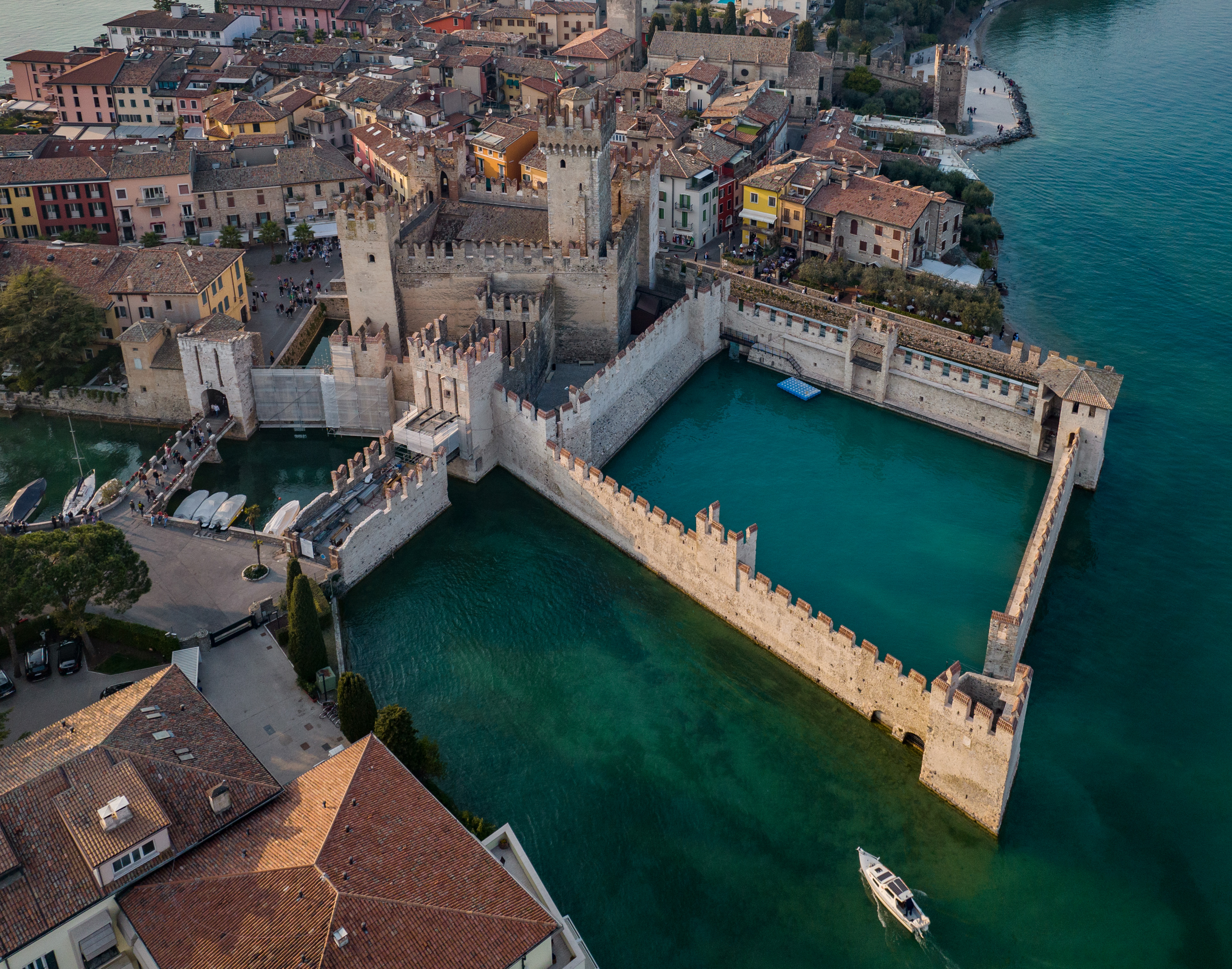
The Scaligero Castle and fortified harbour at Sirmione, Italy.

Harbours or some sort of water access were often essential to the construction of medieval fortifications. Having direct access to a body of water provided a route for resupply in times of war, and an additional method of transportation in times of peace. The concept of rivers or harbours coming directly up to the walls of fortifications was especially used by the English as they constructed castles throughout Wales, with both Conwy and Beaumaris having defended docks, while at Rhuddlan the River Clwyd was canalised for three miles to allow ships to reach the castle. There is evidence that harbours were fortified, with wooden structures in the water creating a semi-circle around the harbour, or jetties, as seen in an artist's reconstruction of Hedeby, in Denmark, with an opening for ships to access the land. Shipyards could also be fortified, as at the Venice Arsenale and the Barcelona Royal Shipyard.

=== Churches and monasteries ===
In some regions, churches and monasteries were fortified, either by enclosure within a curtain wall, or by fortification of the church itself. Examples of the former include the fortified churches of Transylvania and the fortified monasteries of Russia (such as Solovetsky), while the latter can be impressively seen in the fortified brick churches built in southern France after the Albigensian Crusade, such as Albi Cathedral. Many of the Crusader castles were built by orders of fighting monks, such as the Templars, Hospitallers and Teutonic Knights, and had all the buildings of a normal monastery, like a chapter house and refectory, within their walls.

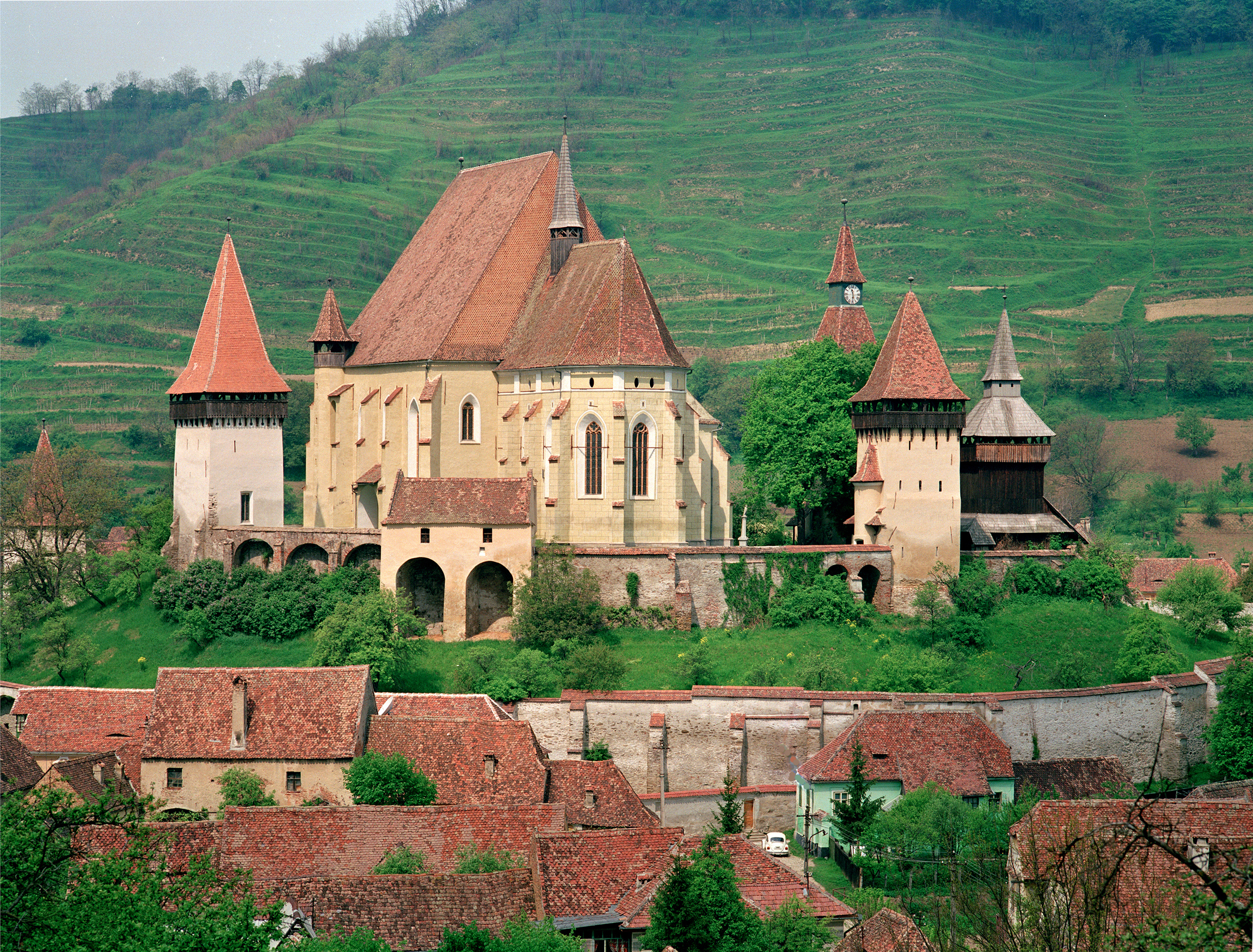
Fortified church of Biertan, Romania.

Walled monastery of Solovetsky

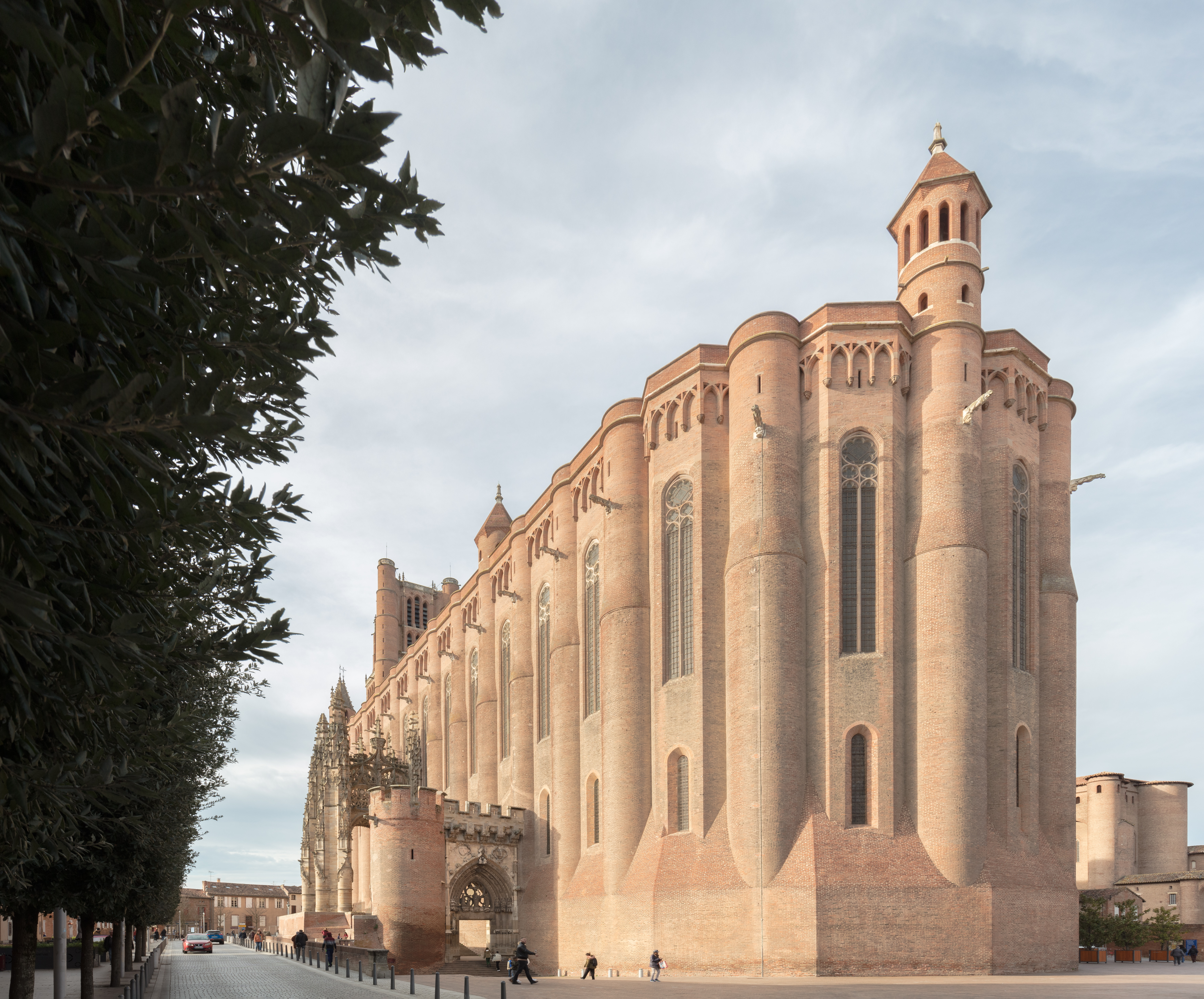
Albi Cathedral from the east

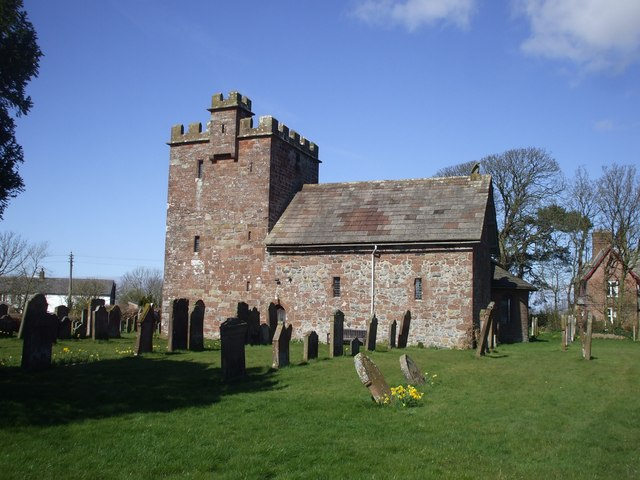
St John's Church, Newton Arlosh, England, with an integrated peel tower.

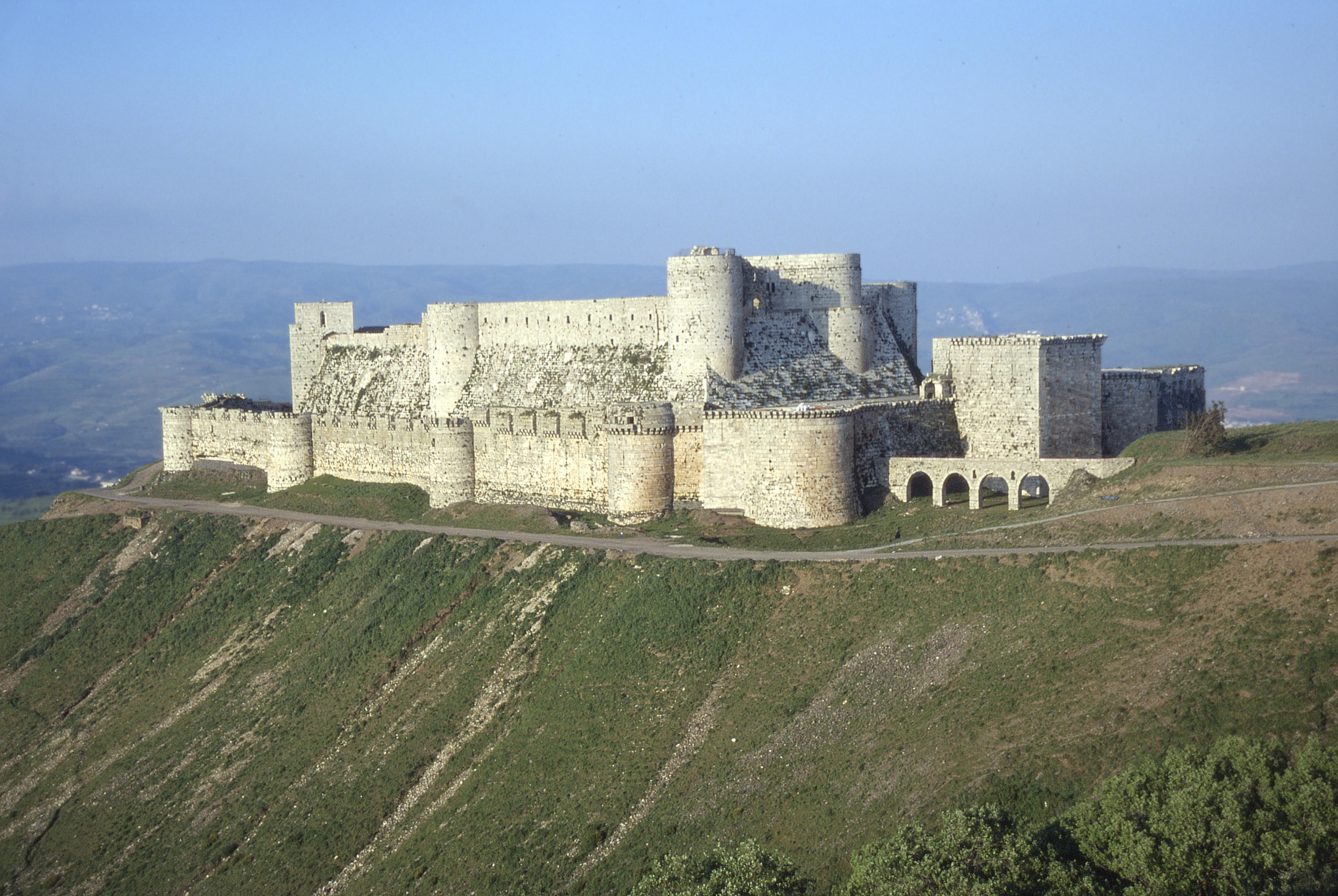
Krak des Chevaliers, Syria, a castle of the Knights Hospitaller.

=== Watchtowers ===
Some cities and castles on frontiers had outlying networks of small forts and watchtowers, by which enemy movements could be relayed and their progress towards the main fortress impeded. The Moorish Kingdom of Granada had such a system of towers around Malaga. Richard I's great castle of Château Gaillard similarly had two advance fortifications - the tower of Boutavant on the River Seine and the small castle of Cléry.

=== Temporary fortifications ===
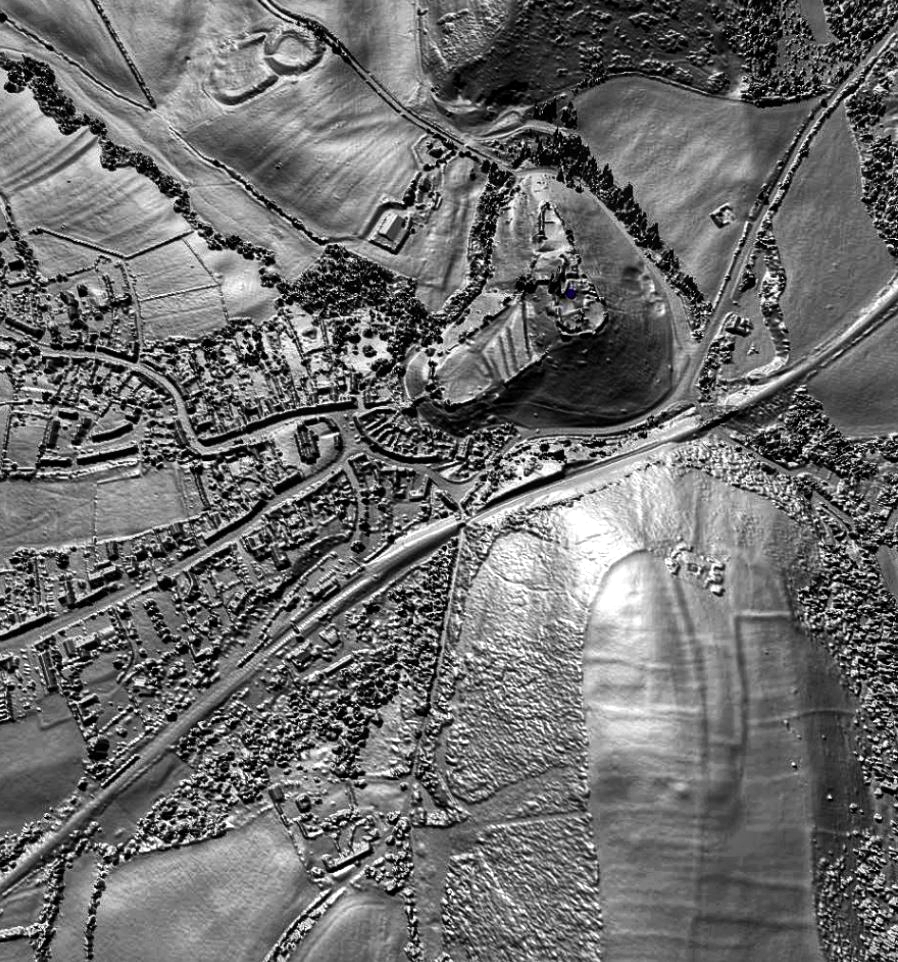
Lidar image of Corfe Castle. The castle is at the top-centre, with The Rings at the top-left.

Medieval siege warfare relied on the effective isolation of the besieged fortification to prevent resupply, especially before the development of more powerful siege engines in the 12th century. This often required the construction of temporary fortifications, from simple pavise shields to large earth and timber siege castles that could be used for years. An example is The Rings at Corfe, a substantial ringwork that opposed Corfe Castle during the Anarchy. Where a conflict was long but stagnant, counter castles could become full castles in their own right, as at Roumelihissar (1451-52), built to cut off shipping into Constantinople. Siegeworks also included earthen platforms to mount siege engines, and later cannon; the earth "buttresses" around Berkhamsted Castle may have been such platforms to carry French engines in the siege of 1216. Defenders could also erect their own temporary works, if a siege was anticipated. Before the development of machicolations, many walls and towers had putlog holes at the wallheads, in which beams to carry timber hoardings could be inserted. Similarly, Dover Castle had a timber barbican outside the north gate, which may have been built shortly before the 1216 siege.

==== Defensive obstacles ====
Medieval engineers used a number of obstacle types including abatis, caltrops, cheval de frise, and trou de loup.

== Siege warfare ==
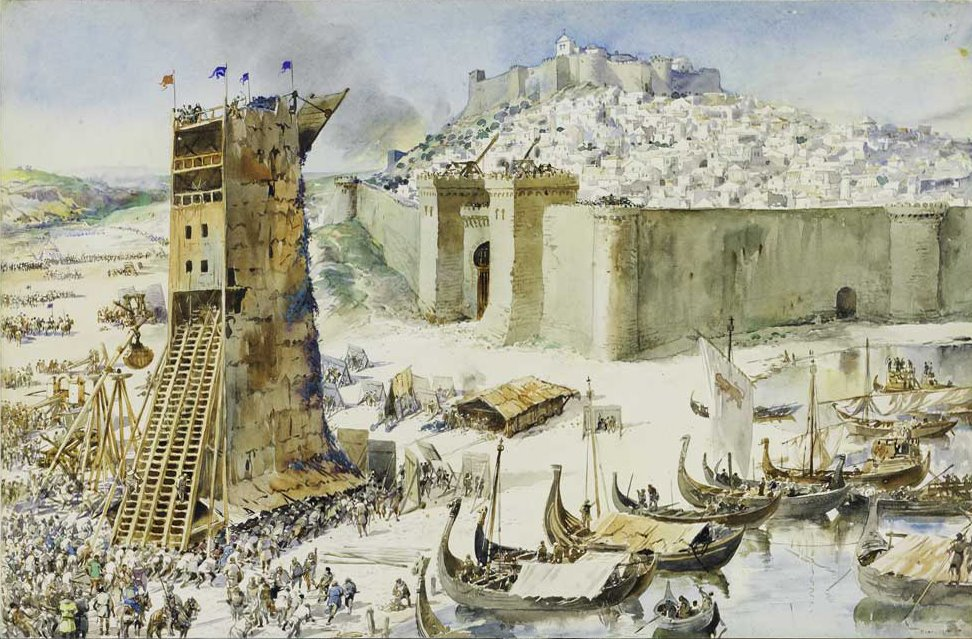
A depiction of the Siege of Lisbon in 1147 CE by Roque Gameiro. There are catapults mounted on the towers of the city's walls. The type of catapult utilized is unknown but based on the appearance it is likely a mangonel or an onager.

Sieges were common during the Middle Ages and because of this many cities fortified their walls and castles to defend against the use of siege engines by their attackers^{1}. Many cities utilized catapults that would hurl stones and other missiles at enemy siege engines and soldiers. The most commonly used catapult for defense was the trebuchet, a torsion powered catapult that dominated the Middle Ages both offensively and defensively. The trebuchet was known for its considerable force but required a longer loading time compared to other siege engines, sometimes taking up to an hour, which lead to some cities using catapults such as the mangonel and onager instead, which could put projectiles downrange much faster than the trebuchet. The trebuchet’s destructive force caused engineers to thicken walls, round out towers, and to redesign fortifications so that they could employ trebuchets for defense. The Ayyubids between 1196 and 1218 built towers mounted with massive trebuchets, which hypothetically would use their height advantage to take out opposing siege engines. Ballistas were another type of catapult utilized as a defensive weapon, however they were not often used. This is because their missiles sometimes lacked the force to dismantle enemy siege engines and their immobility confined them to the top of a city's towers were they could easily be taken out by enemy catapults, including offensive ballistas which were usually employed for the very reason of dismantling defenses on the top of towers and keeping defenders off of a wall's battlements. After the invention of cannons near the beginning of 12th century CE, many torsion powered catapults became largely obsolete and cannons became commonplace medieval siege engines by the 15th century. While mostly used for offensive purposes, the first recorded use of a cannon in Europe was to defend the city of Algeciras during the siege of 1343-44. However slow to load, cannons proved to be devastating weapons that could level a city's walls or destroy siege engines with only a single projectile.

== Construction ==
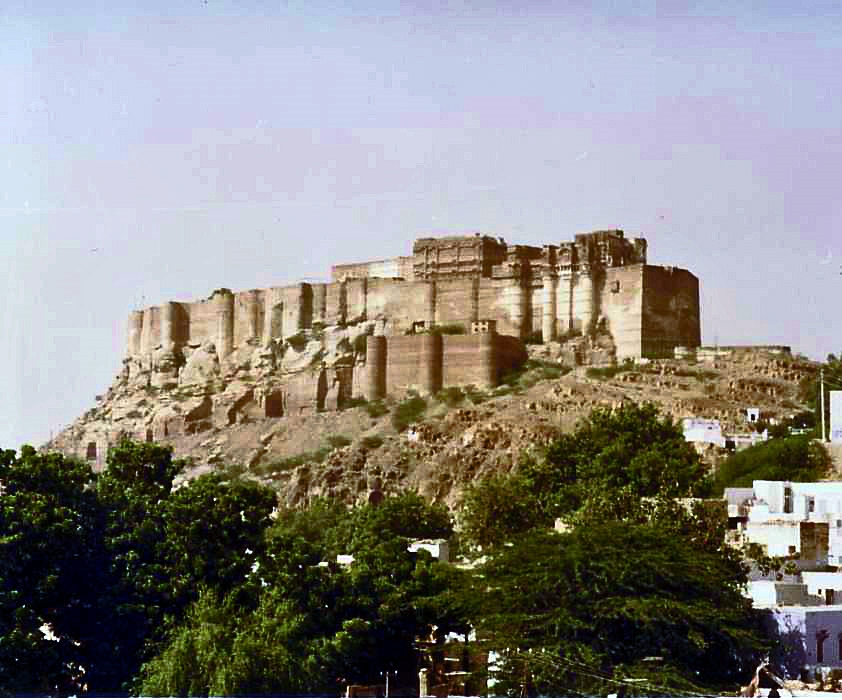
Mehrangarh Fort, Jodhpur, which was built between the 15th and 17th centuries

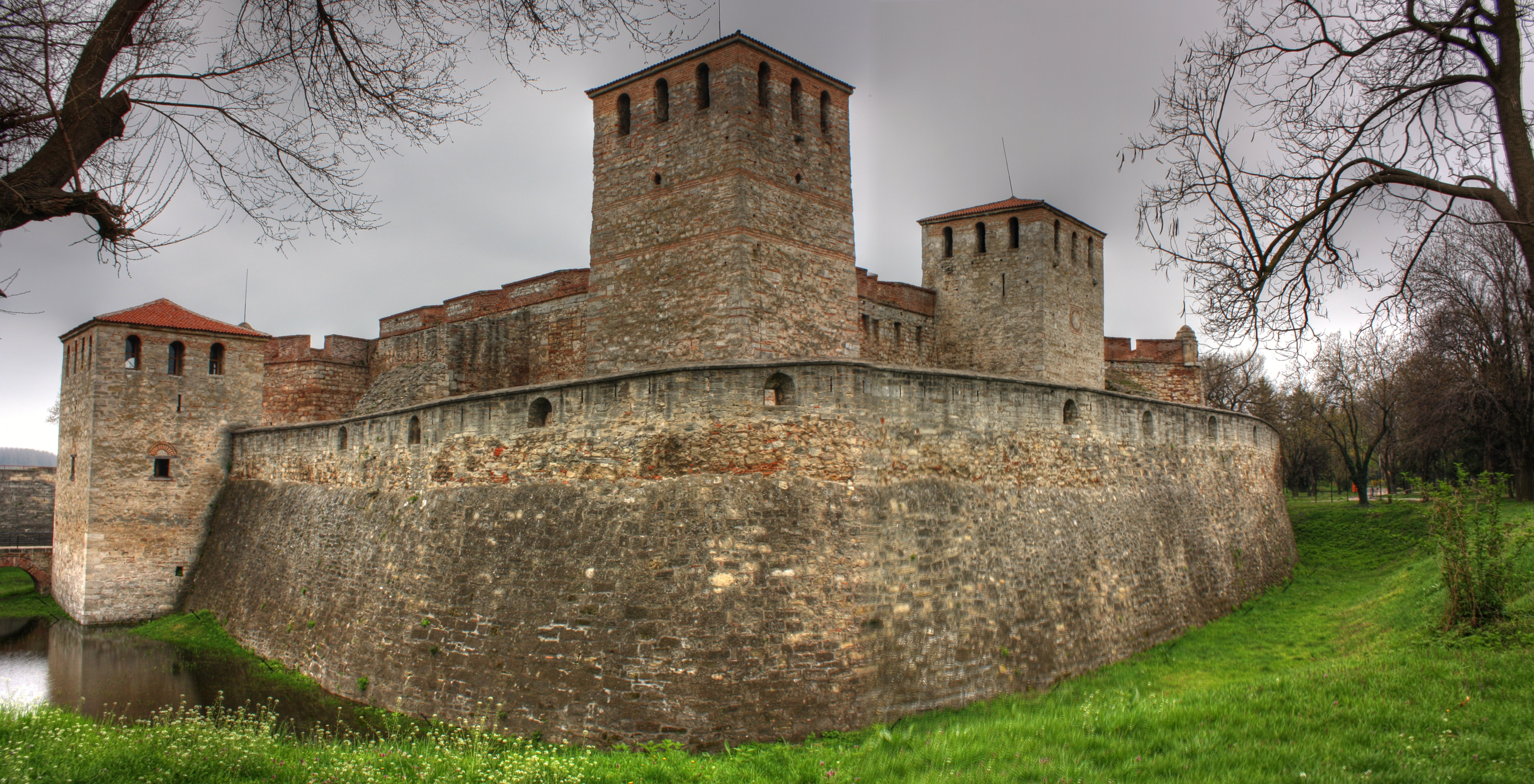
Baba Vida medieval fortress built on the banks of the Danube in Vidin, Bulgaria

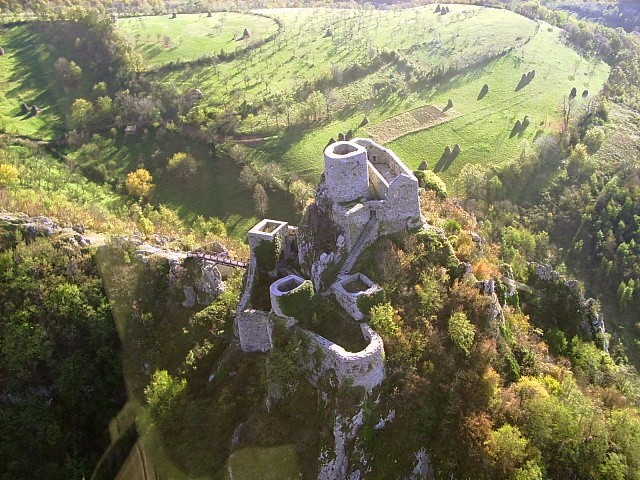
Where the fixed wooden bridge stands today over the precipice, at the entrance to Srebrenik in Bosnia, castle used to have lifting bridge.

Construction could sometimes take decades. The string of Welsh castles Edward I of England had built were an exception in that he focused much of the resources of his kingdom on their speedy construction. In addition to paid workers, forced levies of labourers put thousands of men on each site and shortened construction to a few years.

=== Location ===
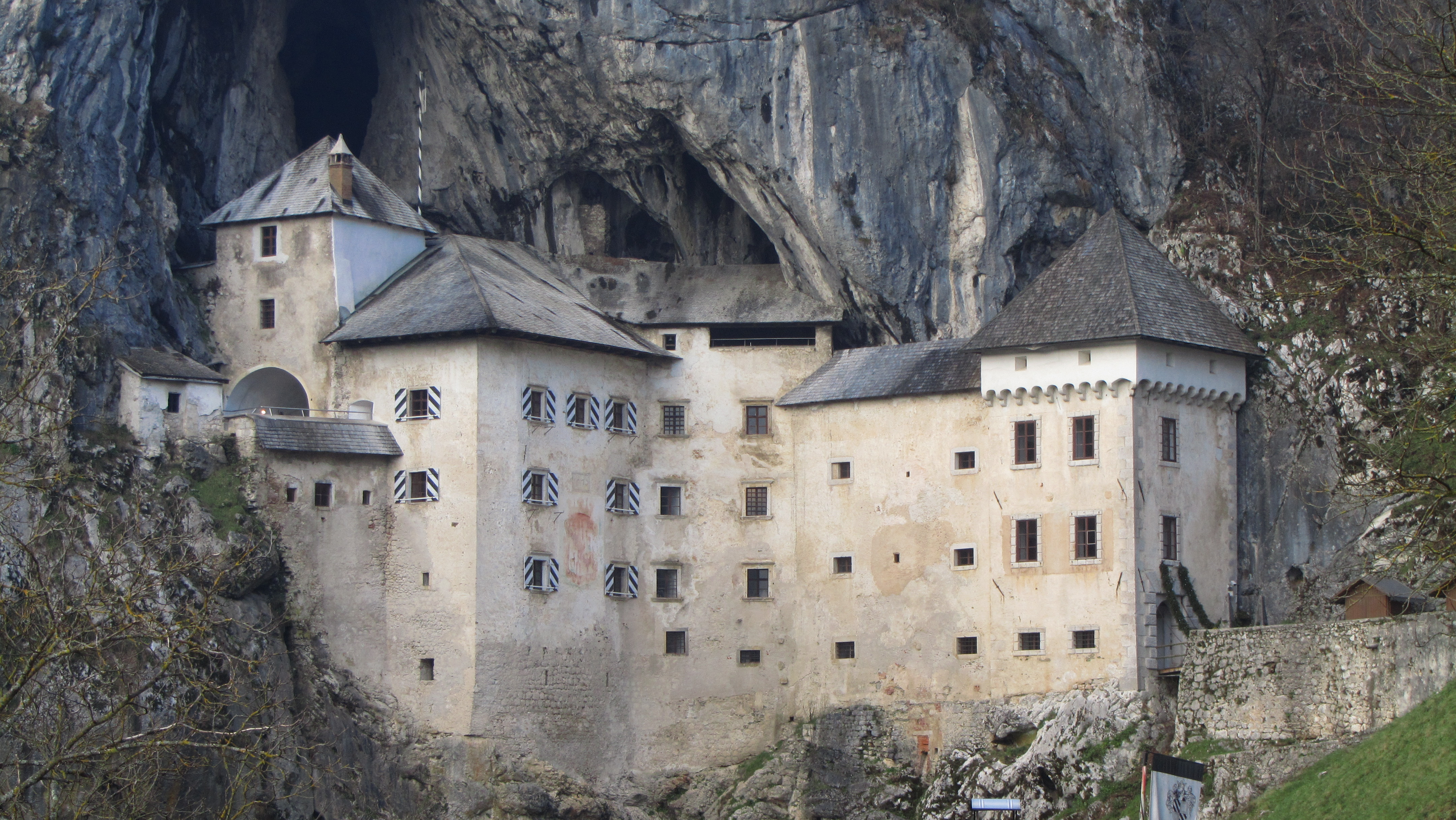
Predjama Castle was built next to the cave

Nature could provide very effective defences for the castle. For this reason many castles were built on larger hills, cliffs, close to rivers, lakes or even caves.

=== Materials ===
Materials that were used in the building of castles varied through history. Wood was used for most castles until 1066. They were cheap and were quick to construct. The reason wood fell into disuse as a material is that it is quite flammable. Soon stone became more popular.

Stone castles took years to construct depending on the overall size of the castle. Stone was stronger and of course much more expensive than wood. Most stone had to be quarried miles away, and then brought to the building site. But with the invention of the cannon and gunpowder, castles soon lost their power.

=== Costs ===
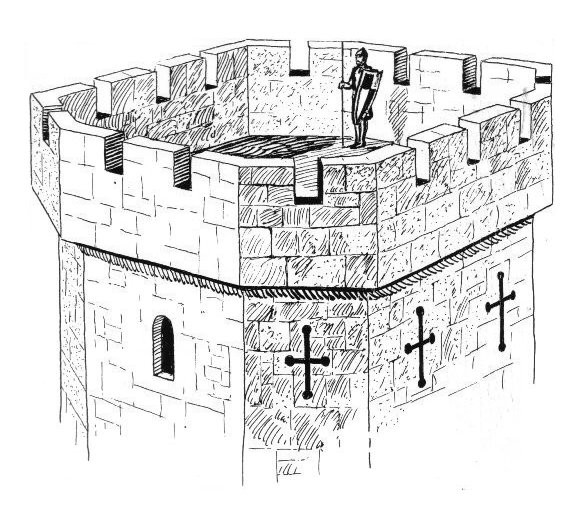
Drawing of battlements on a tower

Costs for the walls depended on the material used. Wood would cost very little and was quick to build, but was weak. Stone was strong but very expensive and time-consuming to construct.

=== Manpower ===
Work was done by teams of craftsmen assisted by local labour. For larger projects, skilled labour would often be brought in from surrounding areas.

== Features ==
=== Walls ===
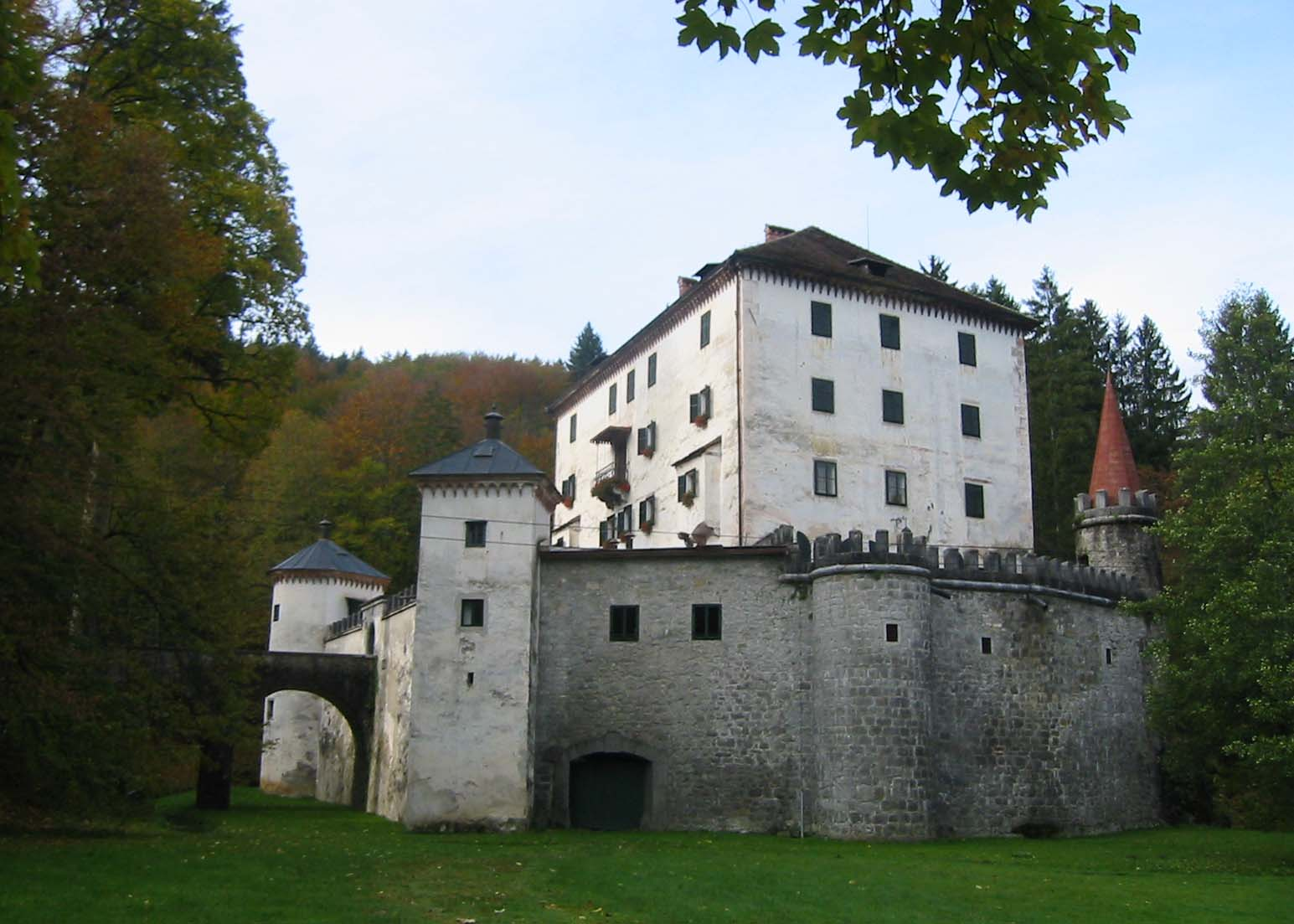
Snežnik Castle protected by defensive wall in southern Slovenia

The height of walls varied widely by castle, but were often 2.5–6 m (8.2–19.7 ft) thick. They were usually topped with crenellation or parapets that offered protection to defenders. Some also featured machicolations (from the French machicoulis, approximately "neck-crusher") which consisted of openings between a wall and a parapet, formed by corbelling out the latter, allowing defenders to throw stones, boiling water, and so forth, upon assailants below. Some castles featured additional inner walls, as additional fortifications from which to mount a defence if outer walls were breached.

=== Gates ===
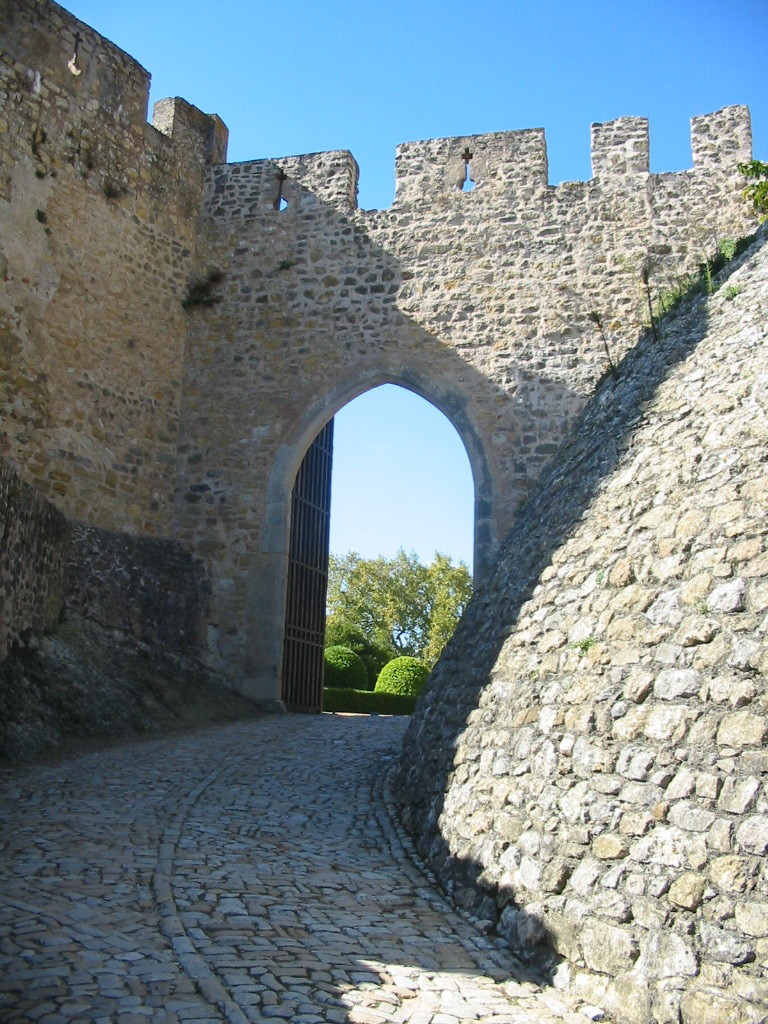
Gate of Tomar Castle, Portugal

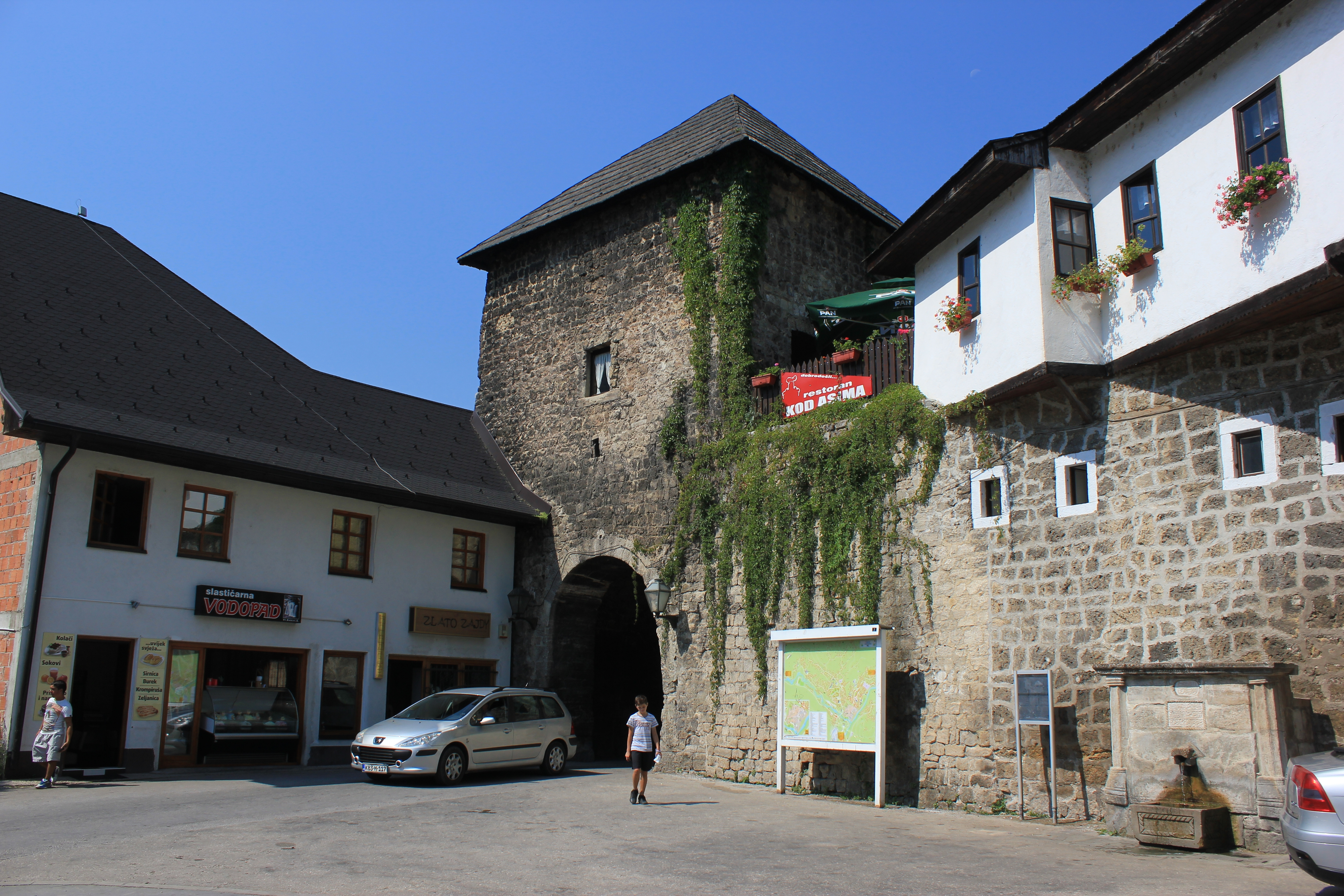
Travnik Gate in present day Jajce

Any entrance through a wall, being an opening, forms an obvious weak point. To be practical, the entryway would have to accommodate supplies being brought through, yet difficult for attackers to breach. For example, passage over ditches or moats would have to be withdrawn to deny attackers. The use of multiple walls or ditches around an entrance would also make it difficult for defenders to use the entrance practically, necessitating better methods of control. Gates came in many forms, from the simple stone buttress and timber blocks, to the massive and imposing stone archways and thick wooden doors most associated with medieval citadels.

=== Killing fields ===
A killing field was an area between the main wall and a secondary wall, so when the first wall was breached the attackers would run into the killing field to be confronted by another wall from which soldiers bombarded them. Soldiers would be positioned atop the second wall and armed with any variety of weapons, ranging from bows to crossbows to simple rocks.

=== Moats ===
A moat was a common addition to medieval fortifications, and the principal purpose was to simply increase the effective height of the walls and to prevent digging under the walls. In many instances, natural water paths were used as moats, and often extended through ditches to surround as much of the fortification as possible. Provided this was not so unnaturally contrived as to allow an attacker to drain the system, it served two defensive purposes. It made approaching the curtain wall of the castle more difficult and the undermining of the wall virtually impossible. To position a castle on a small island was very favourable from a defensive point of view, although it made deliveries of supplies and building materials more cumbersome and expensive.

=== Keeps ===
A keep is a strong central tower which normally forms the heart of a castle. Often the keep is the most defended area of a castle, and as such may form the main habitation area for a noble or lord, or contain important stores such as the armoury or the main well.

=== Stairs ===
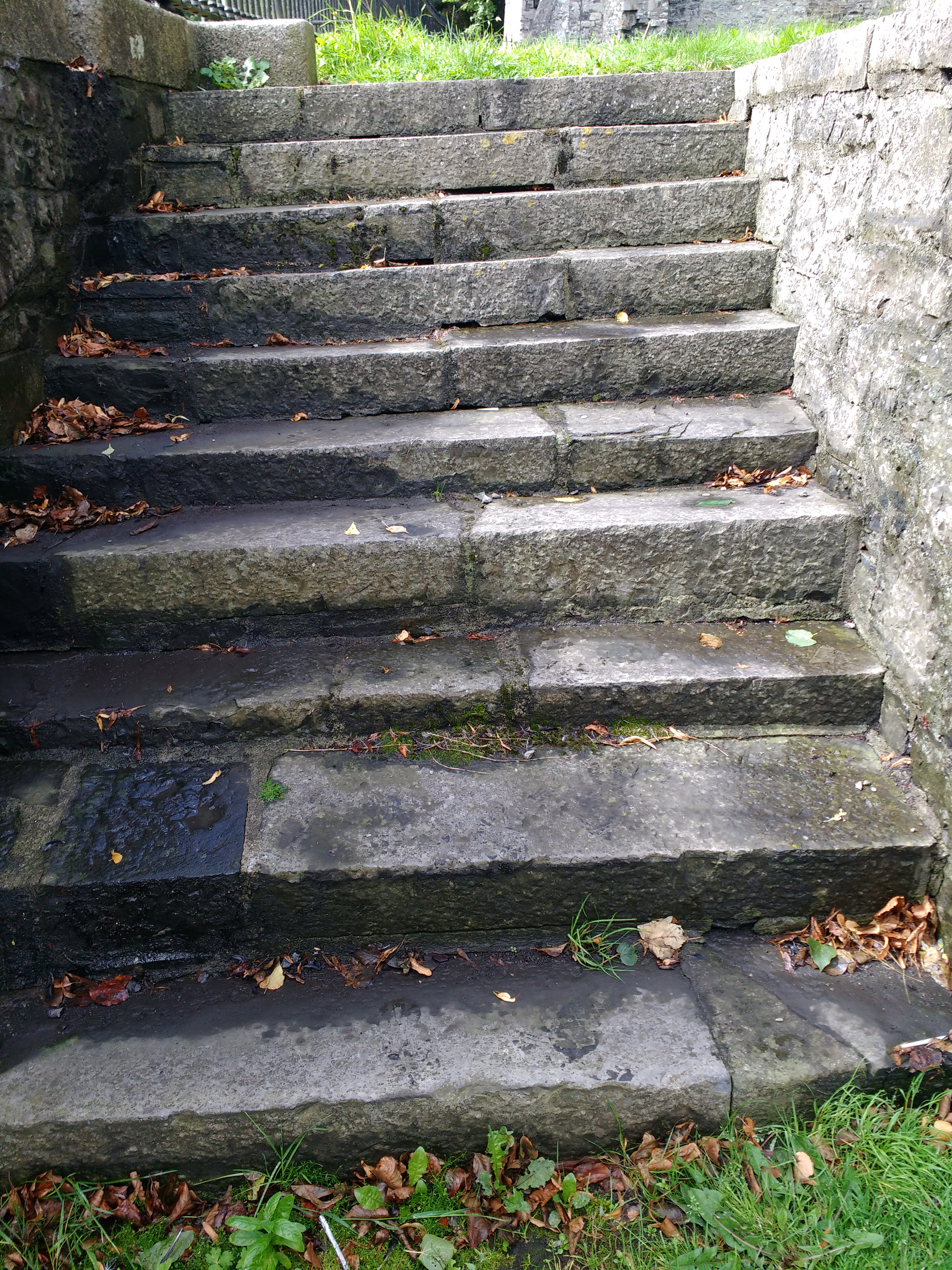
Stumble steps at Maynooth Castle, Ireland. Note the canting, and the varied tread depth and riser height.

Stairs were also constructed to contain trick or stumble steps. These were steps that had different rise height or tread depth from the rest and would cause anyone running up the stairs to stumble or fall, so slowing down the attackers' progress.

=== Doors ===
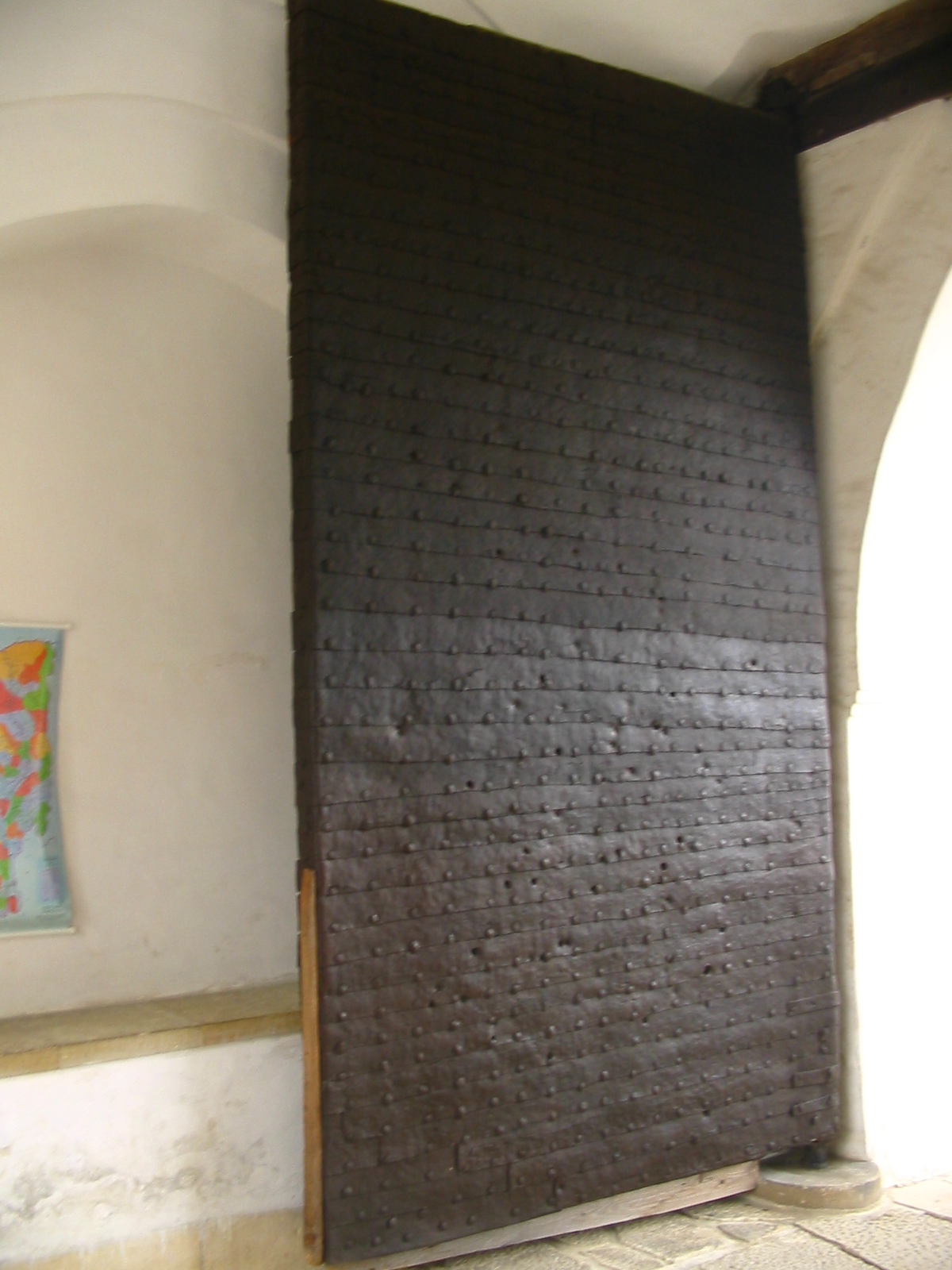
Reinforced wood door

A typical exterior wooden door might be made out of two or more layers of oak planks. The grain of the wood would run vertically on the front layer and horizontally on the back, like a simple form of plywood. The two layers would be held together by iron studs, and the structure might be strengthened and stiffened with iron bands.

The studs themselves were pointed on the front so that attackers would damage their weapons (swords, axes, etc.) while trying to break through.

== Transition to modern fortification ==
From the mid-15th century onwards, the power of cannons grew and medieval walls became obsolete as they were too thin to offer any realistic protection against prolonged bombardment. As a consequence of this, medieval walls were often upgraded with the addition of artillery platforms or bastions, and battlements were replaced by thick parapets with embrasures. In many cases, the medieval walls were dismantled and their stonework, which was still valuable as construction material, was reused in the construction of the new fortifications. The resulting space is often seen in old city centres of Europe even to this day, as broader streets often outline where the old wall once stood (evident for example in Prague and Florence, Italy).

The transition between medieval and early modern fortification can be seen in the fortifications of Rhodes in Greece and the fortifications of Famagusta in Cyprus.

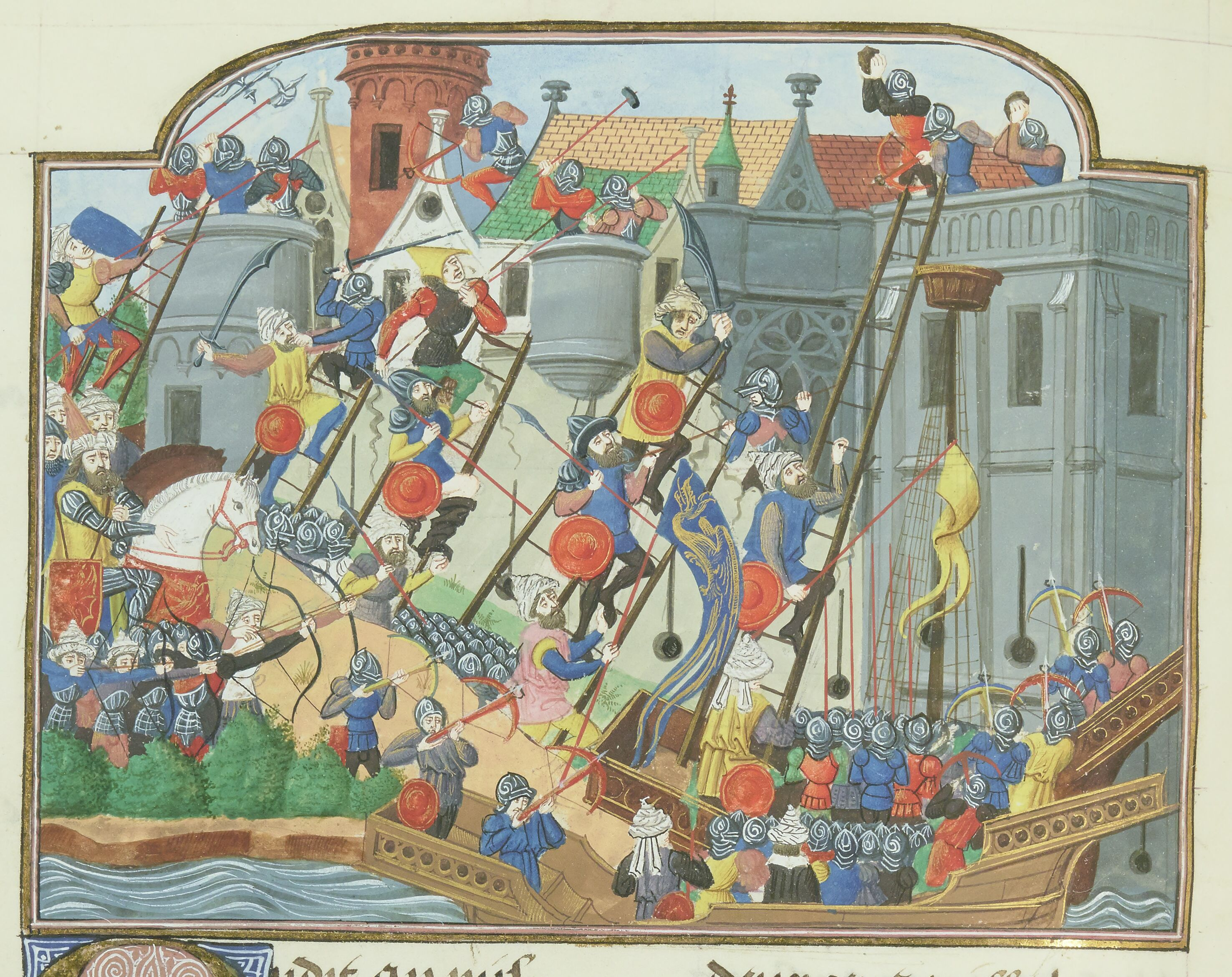
The siege of Constantinople

== Siegecraft ==
- Trebuchet
- Cannon
- Mangonel
- Ballista
- Catapult

== See also ==
- Ad Quadratum: The Practical Application of Geometry in Medieval Architecture
- Medieval warfare
- Siege engine
- Encastellation

== Notes ==
1. These defences were not only used as counter-measures against siege engines and were effective defences against many other forms of attack including the dispatchment of attackers unshielded by siege engines.

== Bibliography ==
- Toy, Sidney. (1985) Castles: Their Construction and History. ISBN 978-0-486-24898-1.

How's your day going?
