= Jennifer Hilton, Baroness Hilton of Eggardon =

The Right Honourable The Baroness Hilton of Eggardon QPM
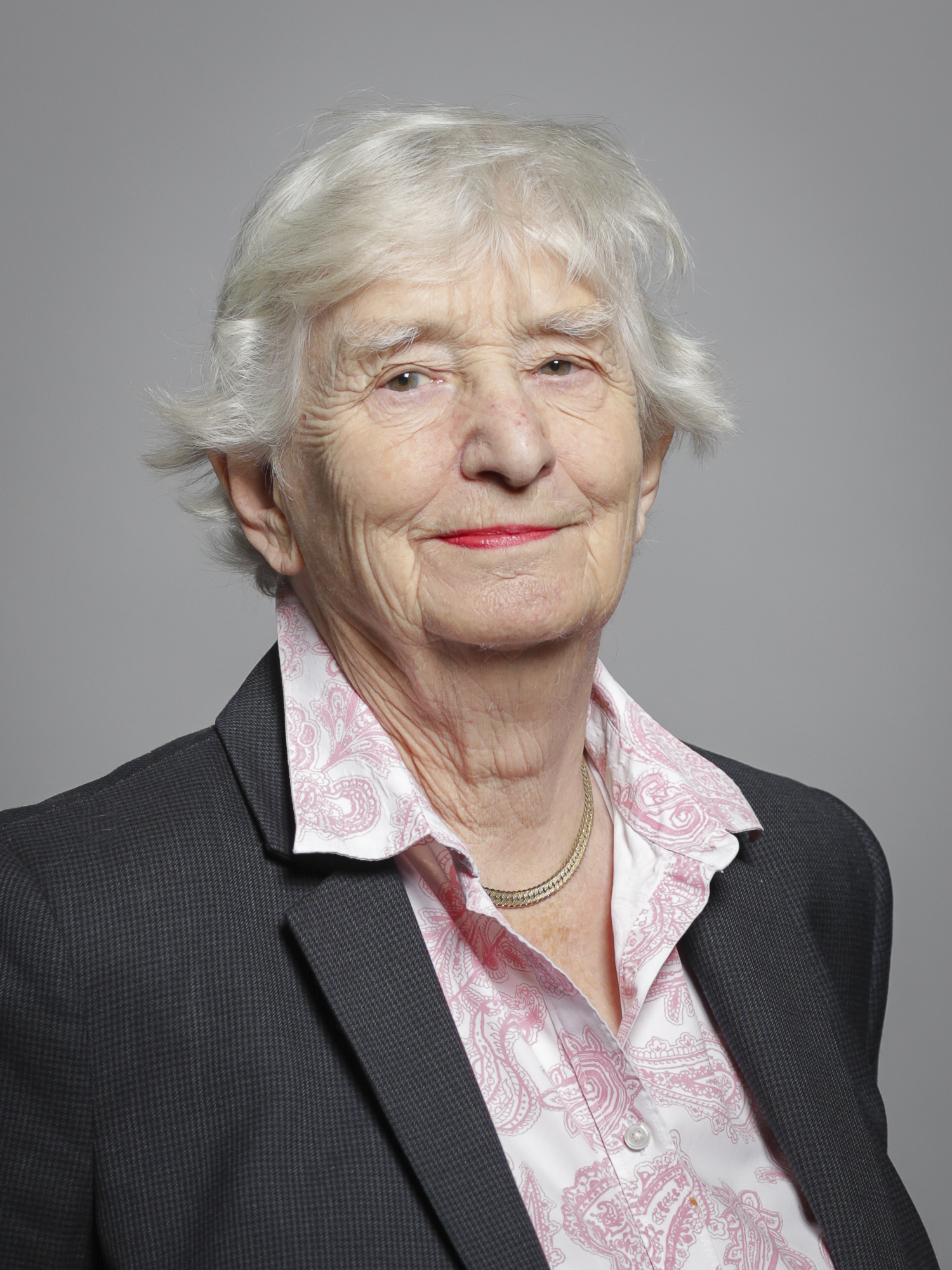

Member of the House of Lords
- Lord Temporal
- Life peerage 14 June 1991 – 5 November 2021

Personal details
- Born: Jennifer Hilton; 12 January 1936 (age 90)
- Party: Labour
- Occupation: Police officer

Jennifer Hilton, Baroness Hilton of Eggardon, QPM (born 12 January 1936) is a British Labour Party politician and former police officer with the Metropolitan Police. She was awarded the Queen's Police Medal in the 1989 Queen's Birthday Honours List.

== Early life and education ==
Hilton was born on 12 January 1936 to John Robert Hilton and his wife, Margaret. She was educated at Bedales School, a private school in Hampshire, England.

While serving as a police officer, Hilton studied psychology at the University of Manchester, graduating with a Bachelor of Arts (BA) degree in 1970 and Master of Arts (MA) degree in 1971. She also studied at the University of London, and completed a diploma in criminology in 1972 and a diploma in the history of art in 1982.

== Career ==
=== Policing ===
Hilton joined the Metropolitan Police in 1956. She was part of the directing staff of the Police Staff College, Bramshill, from 1973 to 1974. From 1977 to 1983, she was based at Heathrow Airport, first as a superintendent and then as chief superintendent. She was promoted to commander in 1984, and was head of training for the Metropolitan Police from 1988 to 1990. She retired from the police in 1990.

She is a trustee of the Police Rehabilitation Trust.

=== House of Lords ===
Hilton was appointed a life peer in the House of Lords as Baroness Hilton of Eggardon, of Eggardon in the County of Dorset, on 14 June 1991.

Hilton retired from the House of Lords on 5 November 2021.

== Personal life ==
In February 2016 she was included in The Independent's group photograph of 28 LGBT MPs and peers.

== Arms ==
Coat of arms of Jennifer Hilton, Baroness Hilton of Eggardon
| Coronet A Coronet of a Baroness Escutcheon Azure between two bees in fess and volant upwards and outwards proper growing from a grassy mount in base and protected by palings about its trunk an oak tree also proper and fructed or. Supporters Dexter on a grassy mount growing therefrom two dog roses proper a crested newt statant erect vert holding by its inner forefoot a tipstaff proper sinister on a grassy mount growing therefrom two dog roses proper a griffin statant erect argent armed winged and tail tufted or grasping by its inner foreclaw a serpent entwined about the foreleg also proper. Motto Poursuivre Raison Avec Resolution (To Follow Right With Resolution) |
