= Theophilus Amin Halil Mogabgab =

Cypriot government official

Theophilus Amin Halil Mogabgab or Moghabghab (Greek: Θεόφιλος Μογάπγαπ) MBE OStJ (2 May 1886 or 1888, Famagusta – 1965) was a Cypriot government official, topographer, designer and scholar of Lebanese Christian descent.

== Early life and education ==
His father was the District Medical Officer of Famagusta, Amin Halil Mogabgab, who earned his BA in Beirut. Theophilus attended primary school in Famagusta, secondary school in Beirut and finally he studied at the American University of Beirut as a Surveying Engineer. After his return to Cyprus he worked at the Government Land Office. As well as in the creation of a railway line that connected Nicosia with Famagusta.

== Career ==
On 15 January 1935, he was transferred to the Department of Antiquities, where he became an Antiquities Officer, under the director A. H. S. Megaw. His area of responsibility was Famagusta and Salamis. Additionally, he was appointed the curator of Famagusta Archaeological Museum. He conducted excavations at the Land Gate in Famagusta. In 1947 he excavated completely the interior of the Templar's church in Famagusta, unearthing many burials. Mogabgab is noted for the cleaning and restoration of a number of Medieval monuments and churches in Famagusta. He documented these projects with over 8,000 photographs that are currently stored in the photographic archive of the Department of Antiquities. In 1958, he was made an officer of the Order of Saint John.

One of his important contributions to Cypriot historiography was the publication of Supplementa Excerpta Cypria, a continuation of the Excerpta Cypria by Claude Delaval Cobham.

Mogabgab also created a number of artworks that depict the Medieval monuments of Famagusta. The Municipal Gallery of Famagusta owned 35 of his works and after the 1974 Turkish invasion they went missing along with the rest of the collection of the gallery. In 2019 some of the artworks that belonged to the Municipal Gallery of Famagusta, among them some by Mogabgab, were returned and exhibited in the State Gallery of Contemporary Art in Nicosia as part of an exchange of artworks between the Greek Cypriot and Turkish Cypriot communities under the auspices of the UN.

== Publications ==
- Mogabgab, T.A.H., 1923, A Tragedy in Stone.
- Mogabgab, T.A.H., 1936. Reports on investigations at Famagusta. Report of the Department of Antiquities, Cyprus.
- Mogabgab, T.A.H., 1939. An Unidentified Church in Famagusta. Report of the Department of Antiquities, 86-96.
- Mogabgab, T.A.H., ed. 1941. Supplementa Excerpta Cypria. Supplementary Excerpts on Cyprus or Further Materials for a History of Cyprus, Volume 1. Nicosia: The Pusey Press.
- Mogabgab, T.A.H., ed. 1943. Supplementa Excerpta Cypria. Supplementary Excerpts on Cyprus or Further Materials for a History of Cyprus, Volume 2. Nicosia: The Pusey Press.
- Mogabgab, T.A.H., ed. 1945. Supplementa Excerpta Cypria. Supplementary Excerpts on Cyprus or Further Materials for a History of Cyprus, Volume 3. Nicosia: The Pusey Press.
- Mogabgab, T.A.H., 1951. Excavations and Researches in Famagusta, 1937–1939. Report of the Department of Antiquities Cyprus, 181-190.
- Megaw, A.H. and Mogabgab, T.A.H., 1951. Repairs to ancient monuments. Report of the Department of Antiquities, Cyprus.

== See also ==
- Eustathios Konstantinides
- Porphyrios Dikaios
- Menelaos Markides
