= Port of Gemikonağı =

Coordinates: 35°08′N 32°50′E

The Gemikonağı Port or Karavostasi Port is a port at Karavostasi, in Morphou Bay, on the north side of the island of Cyprus.

Until the 1930s, before the Lefka mines began operating, the port was mainly used for exporting Lefka's world-famous citrus to European and Middle Eastern markets. In the 1930s, the port was transformed into an important center for the export of Cyprus' copper. According to the Turkish Cypriot historian Nazim Beratli, the history of the port goes back to the ancient times. The port has been inactive since 1992.

The port is under the de facto control of Northern Cyprus. The ports of Northern Cyprus are not registered with the International Maritime Organization (IMO).
