= History of the Jews in Northern Cyprus =

The location of Northern Cyprus (dark green) in Europe

The history of the Jews in Northern Cyprus is related to the history of the Jews in Cyprus, history of the Jews in Turkey, and the history of the Jews in Greece.

Currently 99% of Northern Cyprus populations are from Islamic religion and 0.5% are Orthodox Christians. The other 0.5% comprise smaller Christian groups and other religions, including Judaism.

== Background of Northern Cyprus ==
Northern Cyprus (Turkish: Kuzey Kıbrıs), officially the Turkish Republic of Northern Cyprus (TRNC; Turkish: Kuzey Kıbrıs Türk Cumhuriyeti), is a de facto state that comprises the northeastern portion of the island of Cyprus. Recognised only by Turkey, Northern Cyprus is considered by the international community to be part of the Republic of Cyprus. Northern Cyprus extends from the tip of the Karpass Peninsula in the northeast to Morphou Bay, Cape Kormakitis and its westernmost point, the Kokkina exclave in the west. Its southernmost point is the village of Louroujina. A buffer zone under the control of the United Nations stretches between Northern Cyprus and the rest of the island and divides Nicosia, the island's largest city and capital of both sides.

A coup d'état in 1974, as part of an attempt to annex the island to Greece, prompted the Turkish invasion of Cyprus. This resulted in the eviction of much of the north's Greek Cypriot population, the flight of Turkish Cypriots from the south, and the partitioning of the island, leading to a unilateral declaration of independence by the north in 1983. Due to its lack of recognition, Northern Cyprus is heavily dependent on Turkey for economic, political and military support.

Attempts to reach a solution to the Cyprus dispute have been unsuccessful. The Turkish Army maintains a large force in Northern Cyprus. While its presence is supported and approved by the TRNC government, the Republic of Cyprus, the European Union as a whole, and the international community regard it as an occupation force, and its presence has been denounced in several United Nations Security Council resolutions. Northern Cyprus is a semi-presidential, democratic republic with a cultural heritage incorporating various influences and an economy that is dominated by the services sector. The economy has seen growth through the 2000s and 2010s, with the GNP per capita more than tripling in the 2000s, but is held back by an international embargo due to the official closure of the ports in Northern Cyprus by the Republic of Cyprus. The official language is Turkish, with a distinct local dialect being spoken. The vast majority of the population consists of Sunni Muslims, while religious attitudes are mostly moderate and secular. Northern Cyprus is an observer of the OIC and ECO, and has observer status in the PACE under the title "Turkish Cypriot Community".

== Connection to the Jews of Cyprus ==
The history of the Jews in Cyprus dates back at least to the 2nd century BCE, when a considerable community of Jews on the island is first attested. The Jews had close relationships with many of the other religious groups on the island and were seen favourably by the Romans. During the war over the city of Ptolemais between Alexander Jannaeus and Ptolemy IX Lathyros, King of Cyprus, many Jews were killed. During the war the Jewish citizens remained committed in their allegiance to King Lathyros.

== Connection to the Jews of Turkey ==
The history of the Jews in Turkey (Turkish: Türkiye Yahudileri, Turkish Jews; Hebrew: יהודים טורקים Yehudim Turkim, Ladino: Djudios Turkos) covers the 2400 years that Jews have lived in what is now Turkey. There have been Jewish communities in Anatolia since at least the fifth century BCE and many Spanish and Portuguese Jews expelled from Spain by the Alhambra Decree were welcomed into the Ottoman Empire in the late 15th century, including regions now part of Turkey, centuries later, forming the bulk of the Ottoman Jews. Today, the vast majority of Turkish Jews live in Israel, while modern-day Turkey continues to host a modest Jewish population.

== Connection to the Jews of Greece ==
The history of the Jews in Greece can be traced back to at least the fourth century BCE. The oldest and the most characteristic Jewish group that has inhabited Greece are the Romaniotes, also known as "Greek Jews". The term "Greek Jew" is predominantly used for any person of Jewish descent or faith that lives in or originates from the modern region of Greece.

== Present Jewish Community ==
A synagogue and Chabad House was established in Kyrenia in 2005 with the arrival of Rabbi Chaim Hilel Azimow, a member of the Alliance of Rabbis in Islamic States. The synagogue serves the local Jews of Northern cyprus as well as tourists.
