= Livera =

Livera: Λιβερά (Greek); Sadrazamköy (Turkish)
- Village
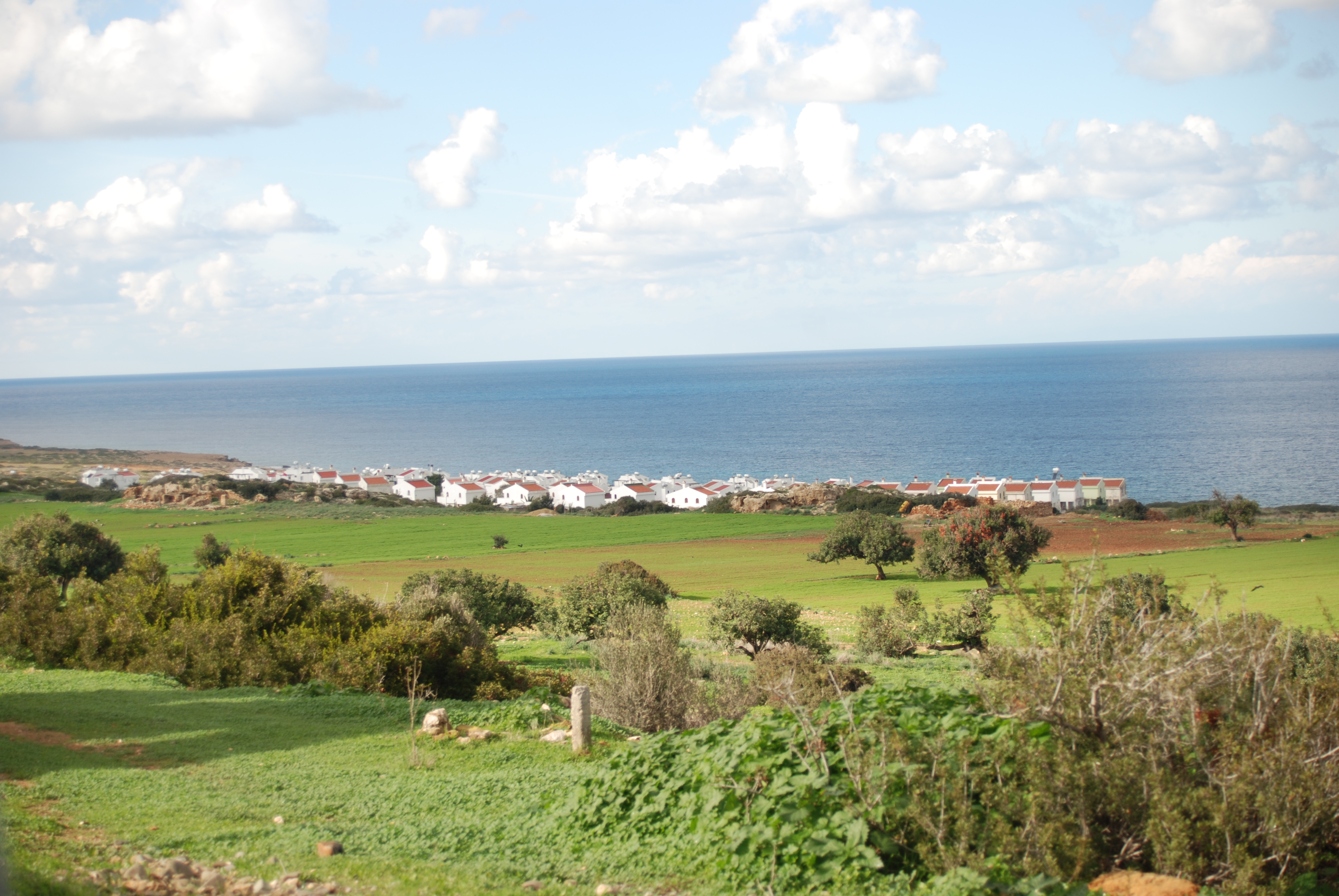
- View of Livera

- Location in Cyprus
- Coordinates: 35°22′58″N 32°57′11″E
- Country (de jure): Cyprus
  - District: Kyrenia District
- Country (de facto): Northern Cyprus
  - District: Girne District

Population (2011)
  - Total: 170
- Time zone: UTC+2 (EET)
  - Summer (DST): UTC+3 (EEST)

Livera (Greek: Λιβερά; Turkish: Sadrazamköy) is a small village on Cape Kormakitis, Cyprus, 8 km northwest of Kormakitis. De facto, it is under the control of Northern Cyprus. The Beşparmak Trail starts at Cape Kormakitis and Sadrazamköy is the first village it traverses.

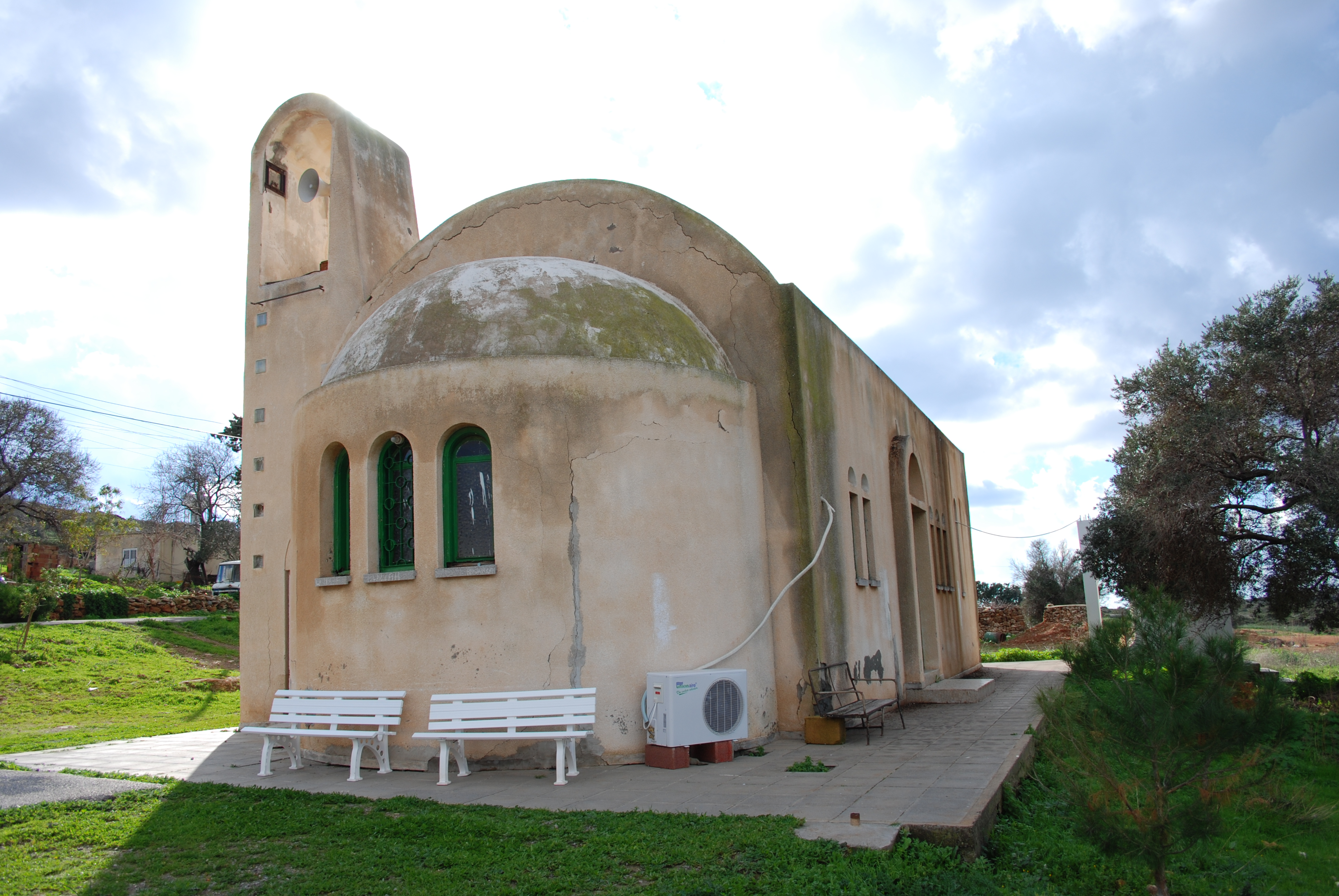
St. Constantine's church in Livera
