= European University of Lefke =

University in Northern Cyprus

Coordinates: 35.129798°N 32.830904°E

- Lefke Avrupa Üniversitesi
- Type: State-trust-run
- Established: 1990
- Rector: Prof. Dr. Mehmet Ali Yükselen
- Students: 9.200
- Location: Lefke, North Cyprus Recognised only by Turkey
- Website: eul.edu.tr

European University of Lefke (EUL) is an institution of higher learning located in the Northern Cyprus (de facto state) Nicosia District town of Lefka, overlooking Morphou Bay. Founded in 1989 by Cyprus Science Foundation, the university opened in 1990 as a member of the Balkan Universities Network, and offers 77 undergraduate and school programs and 38 postgraduate and doctoral degree programs which are approved by Turkey's Council of Higher Education (YÖK). The campus is located 45 minutes from the capital Nicosia, 60 minutes from Erchan Airport and the city of Kyrenia and 80 minutes from the city of Famagusta.

University rankings

Global – Overall
- QS World: 851-900 (2026)
