= Karavostasi =

Karavostasi: Καραβοστάσι (Greek); Gemikonağı (Turkish)
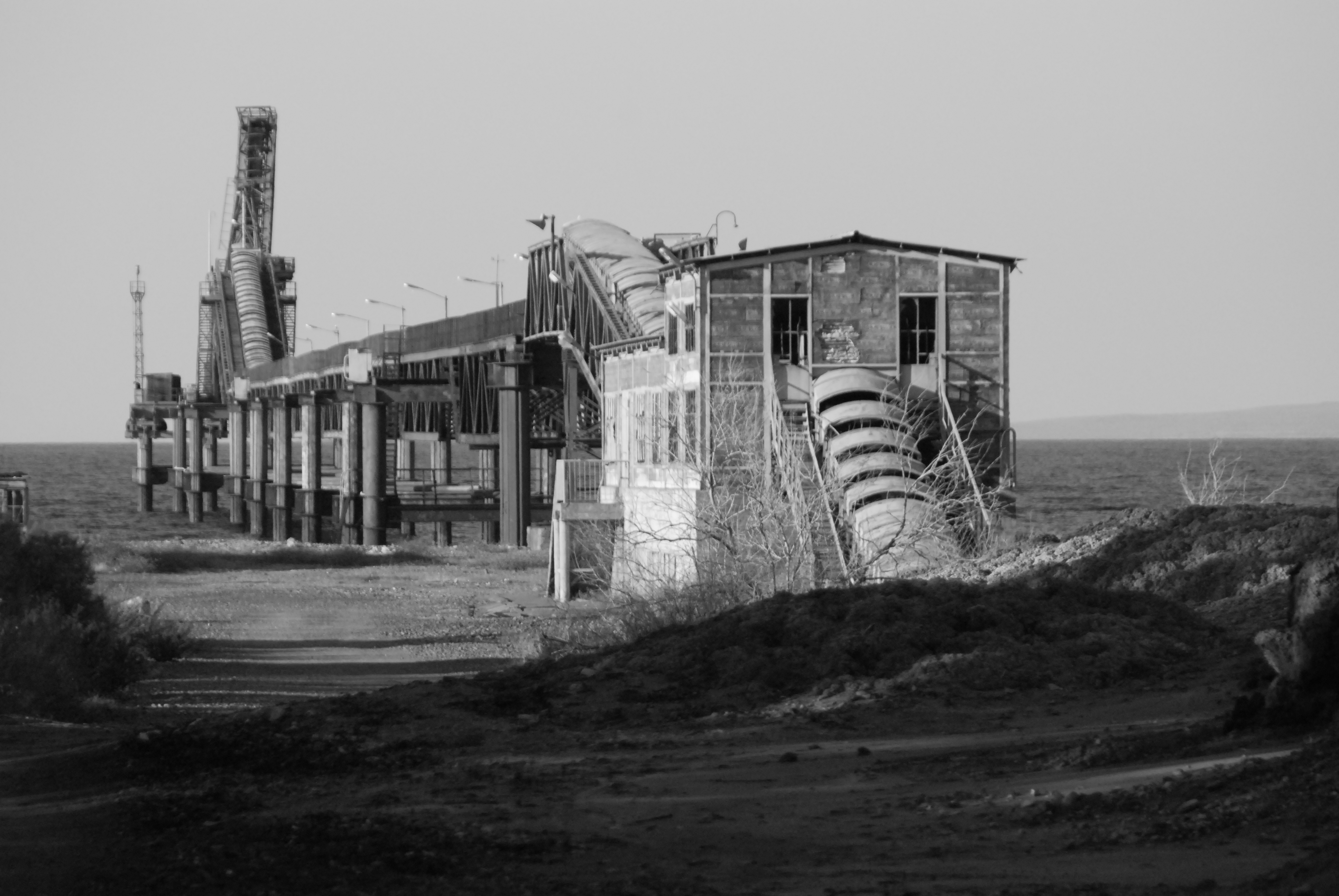
- The jetty at Karavostasi

- Location in Cyprus
- Coordinates: 35°8′11″N 32°50′2″E
- Country (de jure): Cyprus
  - District: Nicosia District
- Country (de facto): Northern Cyprus
  - District: Lefke District

Government
  - Mukhtar: Ahmet Ced

Population (2011)
  - Total: 2,075

Karavostasi (Greek: Καραβοστάσι; Turkish: Gemikonağı) is a town in Cyprus, 6 kilometres (3.7 mi) north of Lefka. It is under the de facto control of Northern Cyprus.

Karavostasi is home to the port of Gemikonağı, which was historically used for exporting copper but is inactive since 1992.

Before the conflict in Cyprus, Karavostasi had been a mixed village. Its name means "boat stop" in both Greek and Turkish.

== See also ==
- Port of Gemikonağı
