= Lefke mine =

Copper mining operation in Lefke, Cyprus

Lefke Mine was a copper mining operation located within the borders of Lefke, Cyprus. It began during the British colonial period in Cyprus and continued until 1975. The mining activities carried out in cooperation with the Cyprus Mines Corporation (CMC) significantly contributed to the island’s economy. It is colloquially known as "devil’s mud".

== Cyprus Mines Corporation MC ==
CMC, established as an American enterprise during the British colonial period in Cyprus, operated the island’s mines from 1912 to 1975.

== Mines opened on the island and their consequences ==
Before the establishment of mines, the local population was impoverished. With the opening of the mines, workers from various settlements across the island came to work in the Lefke region’s mine. The wages encouraged the people to work in the mines. During the British colonial period, more than 30 mines were opened across the island. In a short period, mining waste surrounded the facility. Workers and locals who lived in the region were significantly affected by the waste and continue to be affected today. Many workers and residents developed cancer-related diseases that led to death. The waste from Lefke Mine rendered the local sea unusable and caused a decline in agriculture in an area known for its fertile lands. After the mine was permanently closed in 1975, the surviving and healthy workers returned to their hometowns.

== Effects today ==
Mining in the Lefke region, which began for economic reasons, has resulted in long-term losses and setbacks. Mining waste has caused pollution of the water, sea, air, and soil in the area. The precautions taken after the mine’s closure were short-lived and ineffective. The environmental pollution caused by the mining activities continues today.
