= Nazım Beratlı =

Cypriot journalist

- Born: July 17, 1952 (age 74); Lefka, Cyprus
- Occupations: Medical doctor; journalist; historian
- Title: Dr
- Spouse: Selda Beratlı
- Children: 4

Nazım Beratlı (born 1952) is a Turkish Cypriot medical doctor, journalist, author, researcher and historian.

== Early life and education ==
Beratlı was born in Lefka, Cyprus, in 1952. He studied medicine at Istanbul University, specialising in gynecology and obstetrics.

== Career ==
Beratlı is a published author and columnist, having written for a number of Turkish Cypriot newspapers and journals. His first book, Kıbrıs'ta ulusal sorun (Cyprus: The National Problem), published in 1991, was on the topic of the internal disputes inside the Republican Turkish Party (the primary opposition party in Northern Cyprus at the time, of which Beratlı was a prominent member) that resulted in his eventual estrangement from the party. He later published the four-volume Kibrisli Türklerin Tarihi (History of the Turkish Cypriots). Currently, Beratlı is a columnist at daily Kibris Postasi and a lecturer at the Girne American University.

Beratlı is a member of the Association of Mediterranean Historians.
