= Telephone numbers in Northern Cyprus =

- Country: Northern Cyprus
- Continent: Europe
- Country code: +90
- International access: 00
- Long-distance: 0

In the Turkish Republic of Northern Cyprus (TRNC), the Turkish numbering plan is in use, so the international country code for Northern Cyprus is also +90. 392 is the area code of all landlines. Mobile operators Kuzey Kıbrıs Turkcell and KKTC Telsim use 533 and 542 area codes respectively.

For calls from the Republic of Cyprus to Northern Cyprus, the code 0139 followed by the 7-digit subscriber number is used, and are charged at local call rates. 0139 is still used for direct calls to Northern Cyprus, even after the numbering plan change of December 2001.

For calls from Northern Cyprus to the Republic of Cyprus area code 0123 is used, but the call is charged at international rates. It is also possible to use the international prefix 00357.

Direct telephone connections between Cyprus and Northern Cyprus are operated by the United Nations exchange. This allows direct telephone calls between the two communities and has been in place since 4 May 1998.

Since 2 March 2003 direct international calls from Northern Cyprus to Turkey have been possible. Now callers from Cyprus can call Northern Cyprus either through Turkey by dialing 0090 392 xxxxxxx (calls charged at international rates), or by using 0139 (calls charged at local rates).

== List of mobile codes ==
Note: These are the codes that wireless operators in the Turkish Republic of Northern Cyprus assign to new subscribers. Because of mobile number portability, a subscriber's telephone number may not accurately reflect their actual operator.

In use by	Prefixes
KKTC Telsim	54285 to 54288; 54881 to 54889
Kuzey Kıbrıs Turkcell	53383 to 53387
