= Cape Kormakitis =

Promontory on the north-western coast of the Mediterranean island of Cyprus

Coordinates: 35°24′19″N 32°55′13″E

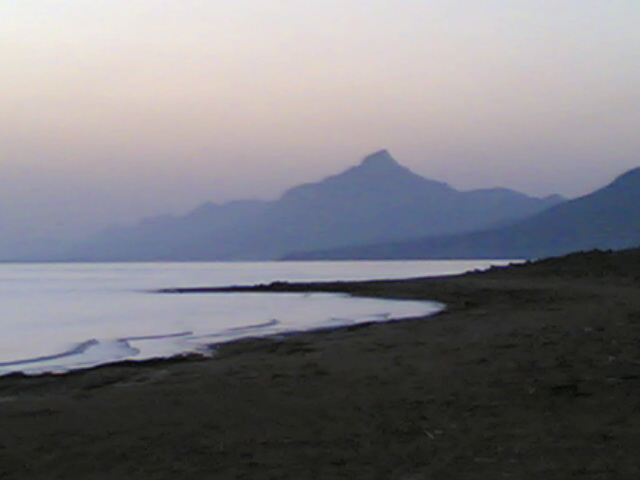
A bay near Cape Kormakitis

Cape Kormakitis (Greek: Ακρωτήριο Κορμακίτη, Akrotírio Kormakíti, Turkish: Koruçam Burnu), anciently known as Crommyon or Krommyon (Ancient Greek: Κρομμύων ἄκρα, romanized: Krommyon akra or Κρομμύου ἄκρα) and also Crommyacum or Krommyakon (Κρομμυακόν) is a promontory on the north-western coast of the Mediterranean island of Cyprus, located in the self-proclaimed republic of Northern Cyprus. Named after the nearby Maronite village of the same name, the cape marks the northernmost extent of Morphou Bay. The nearest coastal town to Cape Kormakitis is Kyrenia. Anciently, it was opposite to Anemurium in Cilicia on what is now the Turkish mainland.

The Beşparmak Trail, a 255 km long hiking trail, starts at Cape Kormakitis, and follows the Kyrenia Mountains all the way to Cape Apostolos Andreas, the north-easternmost point on Cyprus, at the tip of the Karpaz Peninsula.
