= Lefka =

Lefka: Λεύκα (Greek); Lefke (Turkish)
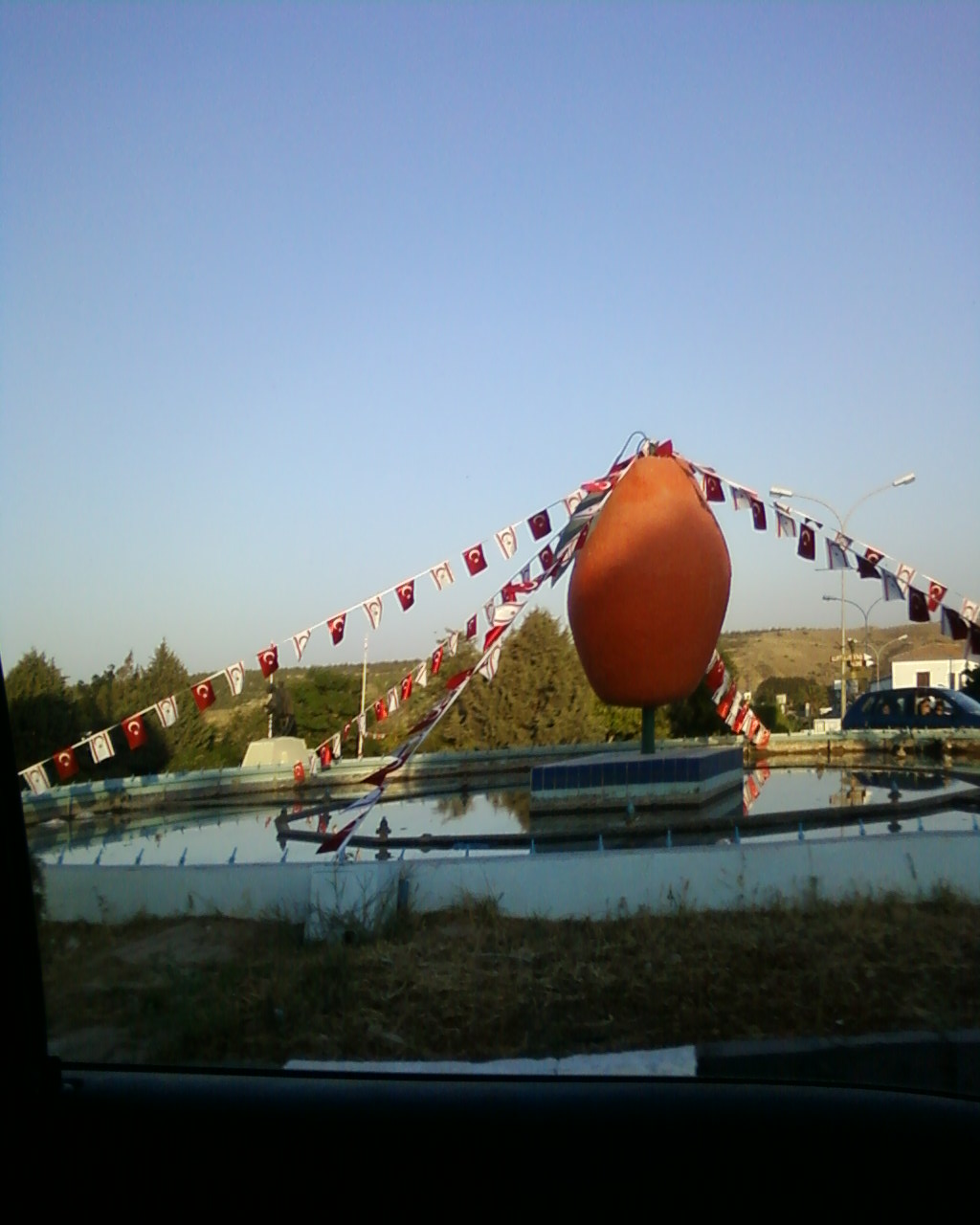
- Orange monument in Lefka town centre, representing its rich orange groves

- Location in Cyprus
- Coordinates: 35°6′48″N 32°51′4″E
- Country (de jure): Cyprus
  - District: Nicosia District
- Country (de facto): Northern Cyprus
  - District: Lefke District

Government
  - Mayor: Aziz Kaya (CTP)

Population (2011)
  - Total: 3,009
  - Municipality: 11,091
- Time zone: UTC+2 (EET)
  - Summer (DST): UTC+3 (EEST)
- Website: Lefka Turkish Municipality

Lefka (Greek: Λεύκα; Turkish: Lefke) is a town in Cyprus, overlooking Morphou Bay. It is under the de facto control of Northern Cyprus. In 2011, the town proper had 3,009 inhabitants. It is the capital of the Lefke District of Northern Cyprus, having been a sub-district centre in the Güzelyurt District until the establishment of the district in 2016.

Lefka is known for its citrus fruits and mines. It is the site of the European University of Lefke. During the Venetian period in Cyprus, Lefka was dominated by Catholics of Italian descent. Turks migrated to Lefka during Ottoman rule. Asil Nadir and Nil Burak were born in Lefka. The city houses the tomb of Nazim al-Haqqani, spiritual head of the Haqqani branch of the Naqshbandi Sufi order, died on 7 May 2014.

== History ==
The first settlement in the Lefka area dates from the Neolithic period. According to one hypothesis, the town was founded in the 3rd century BC by Lefkos, the son of the Ptolemy king of Egypt, who is also said to have founded Nicosia (known as Lefkosia), and named after him. Another hypothesis states that a sick Christian girl named "Lefka", meaning poplar in Greek, came to the town to be healed by the clean air from the mountains. According to the legend, she lived in Lefka for a long time and died in the town, and the town was named after her to honor her memory.

Lefka has historically been a copper mining town. The copper reserves around the town were first mined in the Middle Bronze Age. Their operation continued into the Phoenician and Roman rules. They were closed by the end of the Roman period, in around 150. Ancient tombs dating to Hellenistic and Roman eras (between 310 BC and 150 AD) have been found around the town. In the Roman period, the nearby Karavostasi served as a port town for trade with and transport to Egypt.

A church dedicated to Saint George is known to have existed in the town during the Byzantine rule. Under the Lusignans and Venetians, Lefka served as a district capital, home to Frankish and Latin captains, barons and officers. The Lusignan royal family sought refuge in the town when Cyprus was attacked by the Mamluks in 1425. The town was home to a clean and simple inn in the Middle Ages, serving as a lodging place for those who visited the churches in Soli, Vouni, Solia and Maratasa in the Troodos Mountains. The count of Jaffa had a farm in the nearby Peristeronari.

In the early 16th century, the town was recorded to be the centre of a bailaggio consisting of a group of villages. The land consisted of crown estates, and during the first three decades of the century, the peasant population multiplied, the amount of cultivated lands as well as the price for the lease of the estates increased, in line with demographic and economic trends elsewhere in Cyprus. Cultivation included sugar plantations on royal estates in the 14th and 15th centuries. Lefka and Morphou had been particularly chosen in the acquisition of royal estates for the profitable cultivation of sugar, being placed at the fertile western end of the Mesaoria plain.

After the 1571 Ottoman conquest of Cyprus, Turks from Anatolia were settled in the land and houses that belonged to the Latins in the town. Later, Ottoman officers and their descendants whose service in the island was over also settled in the town. Lefka thus became a mixed town with a Turkish Cypriot majority and Greek Cypriot minority; in 1831, its adult male population was 328, comprising 294 Turkish Cypriots and 34 Greek Cypriots. In 1891, its population was 907, with 741 Turkish and 166 Greek Cypriots. The population increased to 1143 in 1901, then dropped to 1008 in 1911. In 1921, the population was 1163.

After 1921, the population increased rapidly as the copper mines began to be operated again by the Cyprus Mines Corporation (CMC). The population was 1781 in 1931 and 3666 (2685 Turkish Cypriots and 981 Greek Cypriots) in 1946. Due to the Cypriot intercommunal violence, most of the Greek Cypriot population of the town fled in the late 1950s. The town became a Turkish Cypriot enclave following the Bloody Christmas of 1963–64, and it saw an influx of Turkish Cypriot refugees from nearby villages, which they were forced to leave. The population has increased from 3674 (3586 Turkish Cypriots, 88 Greek Cypriots) in 1960 to a purely Turkish Cypriot 4544 in 1973.

== Places of interest ==
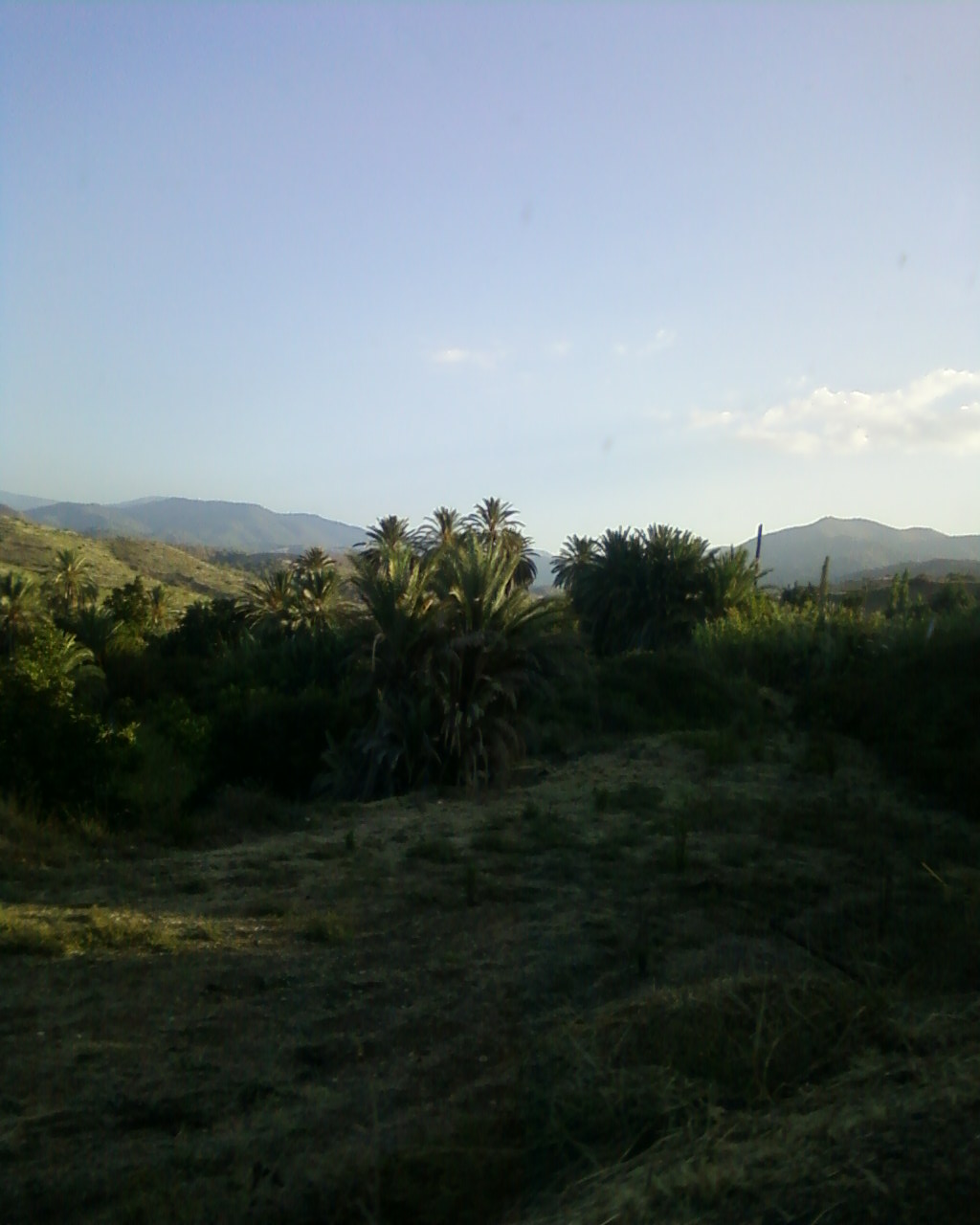
Landscape in Lefka: The town is home to many palm trees

The village is home to three mosques. These are the Piri Mehmet Pasha Mosque, Orta Mosque ("Middle Mosque") and the Aşağı Mosque ("Lower Mosque"). The Piri Mehmet Pasha Mosque is by far the oldest. Its site is said to be the site of the Byzantine church of Saint George. The current building was first built in the 7th century as a church, then converted to a mosque in the Arab raids on Cyprus till the 10th century. It was in a ruinous condition by the 1571 Ottoman conquest of Cyprus. Ebubekir Bey, an Ottoman officer and the grandson of the former Ottoman grand vizier Piri Mehmed Pasha, had the building repaired and established a foundation with his grandfather's name to maintain the mosque. A madrasah and primary school was also built next to the mosque between 1580 and 1584. The Orta Mosque was built in 1904 and the Aşağı Mosque was completed in 1901. In the place of the Aşağı Mosque, there used to be another mosque, probably built in the late 18th-early 19th century. The "Middle Mosque" is so named because of its central location in the town, and the "Lower Mosque" is so named because it lies in the lower quarter of the town.

Lefka contains numerous historical houses that are in the Cypriot-Ottoman architectural style. Most of these houses were built between 1900 and 1930, and while they are mainly in the Ottoman architectural style, they feature elements of Greek architecture, such as Ionian columns, as well. This indicates the fact that many of these houses were built by Greek Cypriot builders. The houses have characteristic bay windows and arches in the interior. They all have inner courtyards, reflecting the conservative, closed Islamic family life of the early 20th century. They lie along narrow, unspoiled streets; the most impressive mansions are located in the Nekipzade, Hacı Emin and Salih Suphi streets.

- Soli – ancient Greek city
- Vouni Palace – on a cliff top 9 kilometres (6 miles) west of Gemikonagi, and 250 metres (820 feet) above sea level.
- Tomb of Piri Osman Pasha
- Storehouse from the British Period

== International relations ==
In 2015, Lefka became a member of Cittaslow International.

=== Twin towns – sister cities ===
Lefka is twinned with:

- Bergama, İzmir, Turkey
- Malatya, Turkey
- Silifke, Mersin, Turkey
- Elmadağ, Ankara, Turkey

== See also ==
- Lefke mine – Copper mining operation in Lefke, Cyprus
- Lefkoşa – Capital of the Republic of Cyprus
