= Northern Cyprus =

De facto state in West Asia and the Mediterranean Sea

Turkish Republic of Northern Cyprus Kuzey Kıbrıs Türk Cumhuriyeti
- Flag Coat of arms
- Anthem: İstiklal Marşı "Independence March"
- Status: De facto state with limited recognition, internationally recognised as territory of Cyprus occupied by Turkey
- Capital and largest city: North Nicosia (de facto); Nicosia (de jure); 35°11′N 33°22′E
- Official languages: Turkish
- Common languages: Cypriot Turkish
- Demonyms: Turkish Cypriot; Cypriot Turk
- Government: Unitary semi-presidential republic
  - President: Tufan Erhürman
  - Prime Minister: Ünal Üstel
  - Assembly Speaker: Ziya Öztürkler
- Legislature: Assembly of the Republic

Independence from Cyprus
  - Turkish invasion of Cyprus: 20 July 1974
  - Autonomous Turkish Cypriot Administration: 1 October 1974
  - Turkish Federated State of Cyprus: 13 February 1975
  - Declaration of independence: 15 November 1983

Area
  - Total: 3,355 km^{2} (1,295 sq mi) (unranked)

Population
  - 2021 estimate: 382,836
  - Density: 114/km^{2} (295.3/sq mi) (unranked)
- GDP (nominal): 2018 estimate
  - Total: $4.234 billion
  - Per capita: $14,942
- Currency: Turkish lira (₺) (TRY)
- Time zone: UTC+2 (EET)
  - Summer (DST): UTC+3 (EEST)
- Calling code: +90 392
- Internet TLD: ct.tr/nc.tr or .tr

Northern Cyprus, (Note: /ˈsaɪprəs/ SY-prəss; Turkish: Kuzey Kıbrıs.) officially the Turkish Republic of Northern Cyprus (TRNC), (Note: Turkish: Kuzey Kıbrıs Türk Cumhuriyeti (KKTC)) is a de facto state comprising the northern third of the island of Cyprus. It is recognised only by Turkey, with the international community considering it territory of the Republic of Cyprus under Turkish military occupation. It extends from Cape Apostolos Andreas (the tip of the Karpass Peninsula) in the northeast to Morphou Bay in the northwest, with Cape Kormakitis at its westernmost point and the Kokkina exclave west of the mainland. A buffer zone controlled by the UN forms a barrier between both sides of the island and runs through Nicosia, the island's largest city and the capital of both sides.

After gaining independence from the United Kingdom in 1960, Cyprus was dominated by intercommunal violence between the island's Greek and Turkish populations. Greek Cypriots favoured enosis (union with Greece), while Turkish Cypriots favoured taksim (partition of the island). A coup d'état in 1974, performed as part of the Greek military junta's attempt to annex the island, prompted Turkey to invade Cyprus and capture the northern third of the island. This resulted in the eviction of much of the north's Greek Cypriot population and the flight of Turkish Cypriots from the south; the Turkish-occupied north unilaterally declared independence in 1983. UN Security Council Resolution 541 rejected the declaration as legally invalid and urged UN members not to recognise it. Attempts to resolve the Cyprus problem have been unsuccessful.

Due to its lack of recognition, Northern Cyprus depends on Turkey for economic, political and military support. This has led some experts to describe Northern Cyprus as a puppet state of Turkey; others contest the label, due to the independent nature of Northern Cyprus's elections and government. The Turkish Armed Forces, with the support of Northern Cyprus's government, maintains a large force in Northern Cyprus, which the Republic of Cyprus, the EU, and the international community regard as an occupation force. This military presence is illegal under international law, and has been denounced in several UN Security Council resolutions.

Northern Cyprus is a semi-presidential democratic republic with a cultural heritage incorporating various influences and an economy that is dominated by the services sector. The economy has seen growth through the 2000s and 2010s, with the GNP per capita more than tripling in the 2000s, but is held back by an international embargo due to the official closure of the ports in Northern Cyprus by the Republic of Cyprus. The official language is Turkish, with a distinct local dialect being spoken. The vast majority of Turkish Cypriots are Sunni Muslims, though everyday religious attitudes are largely moderate and secular. Northern Cyprus is an observer state of ECO and OIC under the name "Turkish Cypriot State", PACE under the name "Turkish Cypriot Community", and Organization of Turkic States with its own name.

== History ==
=== 1960–1974 ===
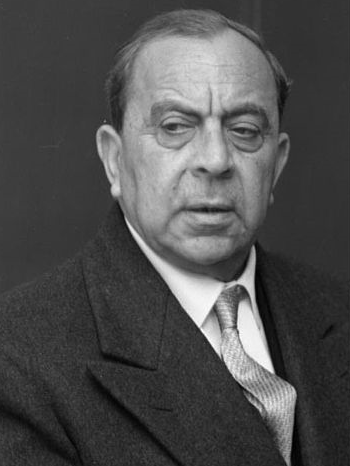
Fazıl Küçük, former Turkish Cypriot leader and former Vice-President of Cyprus

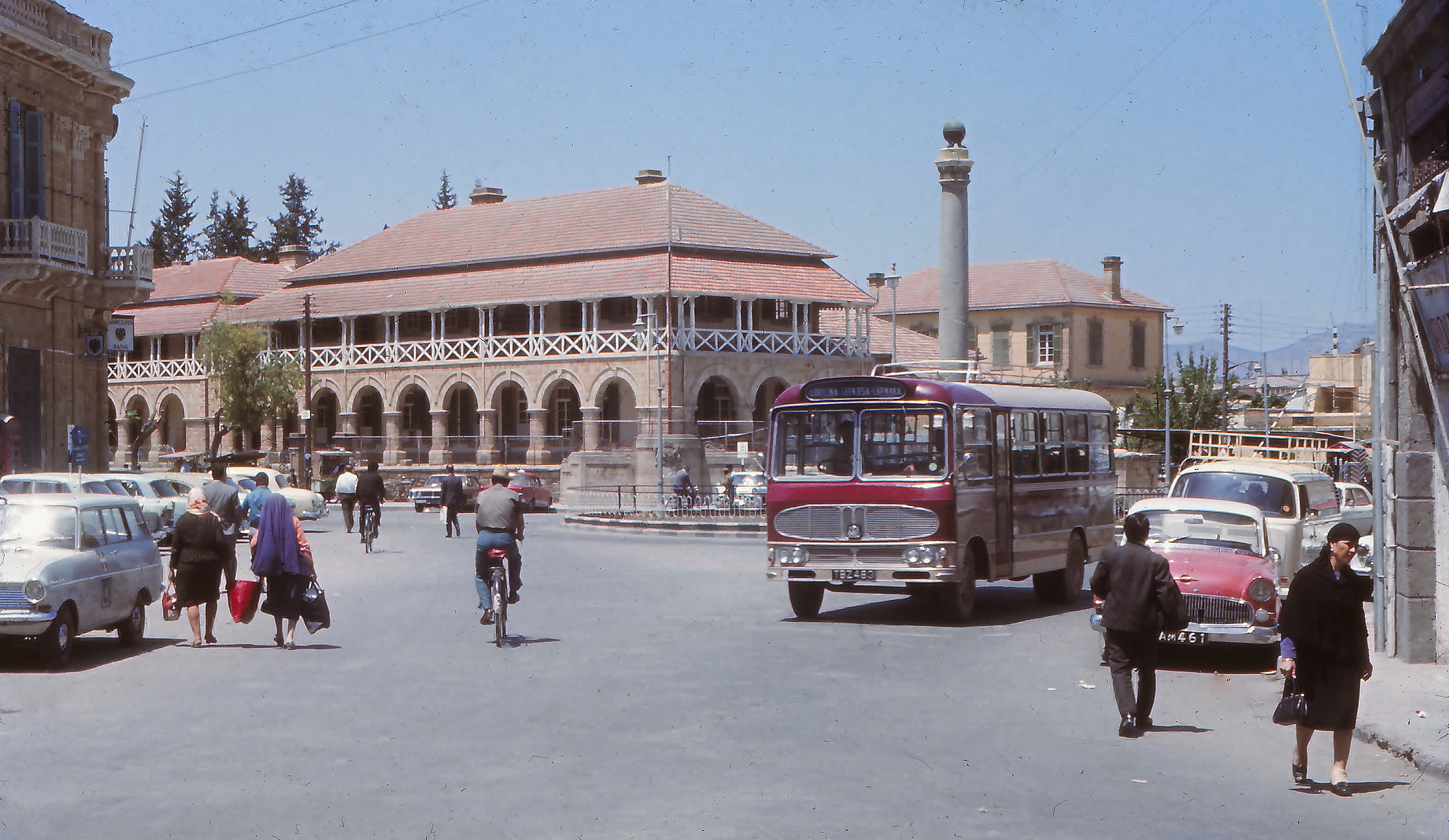
Sarayönü Square of North Nicosia in 1969, after the division of the city

A united Cyprus gained independence from British rule in August 1960, after both Greek and Turkish Cypriots agreed to abandon their respective plans for enosis (union with Greece) and taksim (Turkish for "partition"). The agreement involved Cyprus being governed under a constitution which apportioned cabinet posts, parliamentary seats and civil service jobs on an agreed ratio between the two communities. Within three years, tensions began to emerge between the Greek and Turkish Cypriots in administrative affairs. In particular, disputes over separate municipalities and taxation created a deadlock in government. In 1963 President Makarios proposed unilateral changes to the constitution, via 13 amendments. Turkey and the Turkish Cypriots rejected the proposed amendments, claiming that this was an attempt to settle constitutional disputes in favour of the Greek Cypriots and to demote Turkish status from co-founders of the state to one of minority status, removing their constitutional safeguards in the process. Turkish Cypriots filed a lawsuit against the 13 amendments in the Supreme Constitutional Court of Cyprus (SCCC). Makarios announced that he would not comply with the decision of the SCCC, whatever it was, and defended his amendments as being necessary "to resolve constitutional deadlocks" as opposed to the stance of the SCCC.

On 25 April 1963, the SCCC decided that Makarios's 13 amendments were illegal. The Cyprus Supreme Court's ruling found that Makarios had violated the constitution by failing to fully implement its measures and that Turkish Cypriots had not been allowed to return to their positions in government without first accepting the proposed constitutional amendments. On 21 May, the president of the SCCC resigned due to Makarios's stance. On 15 July, Makarios ignored the decision of the SCCC. After the resignation of the president of the SCCC, the SCCC ceased to exist. The Supreme Court of Cyprus (SCC) was formed by merging the SCCC and the High Court of Cyprus, and undertook the jurisdiction and powers of the SCCC and HCC. On 30 November, Makarios legalised the 13 proposals. In 1963, the Greek Cypriot wing of the government created the Akritas plan which outlined a policy that would remove Turkish Cypriots from the government and ultimately lead to union with Greece. The plan stated that if the Turkish Cypriots objected then they should be "violently subjugated before foreign powers could intervene".

On 21 December 1963, shots were fired at a Turkish Cypriot crowd that had gathered as a Greek police patrol stopped two Turkish Cypriots, claiming to ask for identification; two Turkish Cypriots were killed. Almost immediately, intercommunal violence broke out with a major Greek Cypriot paramilitary attack upon Turkish Cypriots in Nicosia and Larnaca. Though the TMT—a Turkish resistance group created in 1959 to promote a policy of taksim (division or partition of Cyprus), in opposition to the Greek Cypriot nationalist group EOKA and its advocacy of enosis (union of Cyprus with Greece)—committed a number of acts of retaliation, historian of the Cyprus conflict Keith Kyle noted that "there is no doubt that the main victims of the numerous incidents that took place during the next few months were Turks". Seven hundred Turkish hostages, including children, were taken from the northern suburbs of Nicosia. Nikos Sampson, a nationalist and future coup leader, led a group of Greek Cypriot irregulars into the mixed suburb of Omorphita/Küçük Kaymaklı and attacked the Turkish Cypriot population. By the end of 1964, 364 Turkish Cypriots and 174 Greek Cypriots had been killed.

Turkish Cypriot members of the government had by now withdrawn, creating an essentially Greek Cypriot administration in control of all institutions of the state. After the partnership government collapsed, the Greek Cypriot-led administration was recognised as the legitimate government of the Republic of Cyprus at the stage of the debates in New York in February 1964. In September 1964, the then United Nations Secretary General, U Thant reported that "UNFICYP carried out a detailed survey of all damage to properties throughout the island during the disturbances; it shows that in 109 villages, most of them Turkish-Cypriot or mixed villages, 527 houses have been destroyed while 2,000 others have suffered damage from looting". Widespread looting of Turkish Cypriot villages prompted 20,000 refugees to retreat into armed enclaves, where they remained for the next 11 years, relying on food and medical supplies from Turkey to survive. Turkish Cypriots formed paramilitary groups to defend the enclaves, leading to a gradual division of the island's communities into two hostile camps. The violence had also seen thousands of Turkish Cypriots attempt to escape the violence by emigrating to Britain, Australia and Turkey. On 28 December 1967, the Turkish Cypriot Provisional Administration was founded.

=== 1974–1983 ===
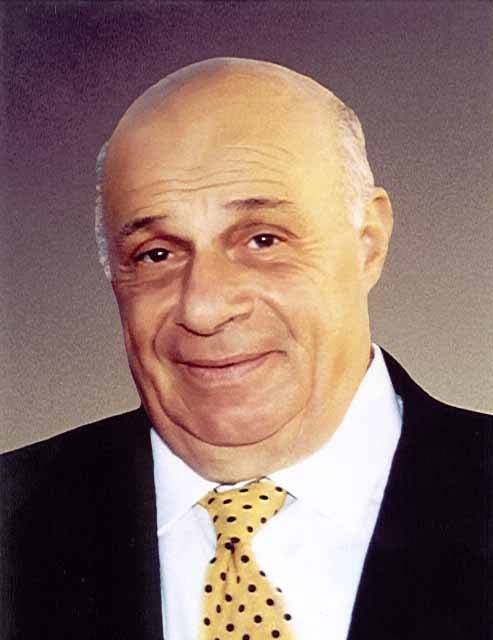
Rauf Denktaş, founder and former President of the Turkish Republic of Northern Cyprus

On 6 July 1974, Makarios accused the Greek government of turning the Cypriot National Guard into an army of occupation. On 15 July 1974, the Greek military junta and the Cypriot National Guard backed a Greek Cypriot military coup d'état in Cyprus. Pro-Enosis Nikos Sampson replaced President Makarios as the new president. The Greek Cypriot coupists proclaimed the establishment of the "Hellenic Republic of Cyprus". Turkey claimed that under the 1960 Treaty of Guarantee, the coup was sufficient reason for military action to protect the Turkish Cypriot populace, and thus Turkey invaded Cyprus on 20 July. Turkish forces proceeded to take over the northern four-elevenths of the island (about 36% of Cyprus's total area). The coup caused a civil war filled with ethnic violence, after which it collapsed and Makarios returned to power.

On 2 August 1975, in the negotiations in Vienna, a population exchange agreement was signed between community leaders Rauf Denktaş and Glafcos Clerides under the auspices of the United Nations. On the basis of the Agreement, 196,000 Greek Cypriots living in the north were exchanged for 42,000 Turkish Cypriots living in the south (the number of settlers was disputed). The Orthodox Greek Cypriots in Rizokarpaso, Agios Andronikos and Agia Triada chose to stay in their villages, as did also Catholic Maronites in Asomatos, Karpasia and Kormakitis. Approximately 1,500 Greek Cypriots and 500 Turkish Cypriots remain missing. The invasion led to the formation of the first sovereign administrative body of Northern Cyprus in August 1974, the Autonomous Turkish Cypriot Administration.

In 1975, the Turkish Federated State of Cyprus (Kıbrıs Türk Federe Devleti) was declared as a first step towards a future federated Cypriot state, but was rejected by the Republic of Cyprus and the United Nations.

The north unilaterally declared its independence on 15 November 1983 under the name of the Turkish Republic of Northern Cyprus. This was rejected by the UN via Security Council Resolution 541.

=== 1983–present ===
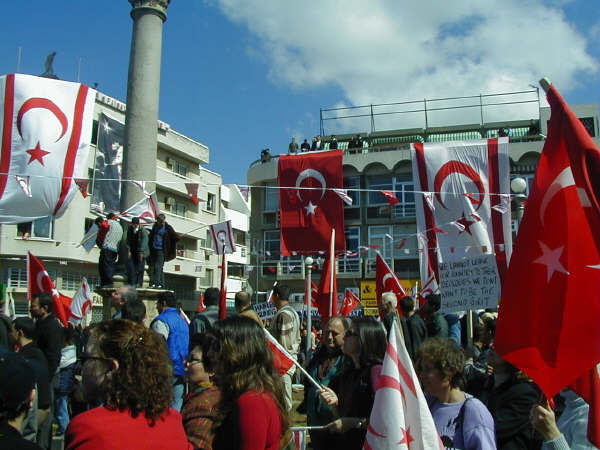
Atatürk Square, North Nicosia in 2006, with the Northern Cypriot and Turkish flags

In recent years, the politics of reunification has dominated the island's affairs. The European Union decided in 2000 to accept Cyprus as a member, even if it was divided. This was due to their view of Rauf Denktaş, the pro-independence Turkish Cypriot President, as the main stumbling block, but also due to Greece threatening to block eastern EU expansion. It was hoped that Cyprus's planned accession into the European Union would act as a catalyst towards a settlement. In the time leading up to Cyprus becoming a member, a new government was elected in Turkey and Rauf Denktaş lost political power in Cyprus. In 2004, a United Nations–brokered peace settlement was presented in a referendum to both sides. The proposed settlement was opposed by both the president of Cyprus, Tassos Papadopoulos, and Turkish Cypriot president Rauf Denktaş; in the referendum, while 65% of Turkish Cypriots accepted the proposal, 76% of Greek Cypriots rejected it. As a result, Cyprus entered the European Union divided, with the effects of membership suspended for Northern Cyprus.

Denktaş resigned in the wake of the vote, ushering in the pro-settlement Mehmet Ali Talat as his successor. However, the pro-settlement side and Mehmet Ali Talat lost momentum due to the ongoing embargo and isolation, despite promises from the European Union that these would be eased. As a result, the Turkish Cypriot electorate became frustrated. This led ultimately to the pro-independence side winning the general elections in 2009 and its candidate, former Prime Minister Derviş Eroğlu, winning the presidential elections in 2010. Although Eroğlu and his National Unity Party favours the independence of Northern Cyprus rather than reunification with the Republic of Cyprus, he is negotiating with the Greek Cypriot side towards a settlement for reunification.

In 2011, Turkish Cypriots protested against economic reforms made by the Northern Cyprus and Turkish governments; see 2011 Turkish Cypriot demonstrations.

In October 2020, Ersin Tatar, the candidate of the National Unity Party (UBP), was elected as the 5th president of the Turkish Republic of Northern Cyprus after winning the presidential elections against incumbent president Mustafa Akıncı.

== Geography ==
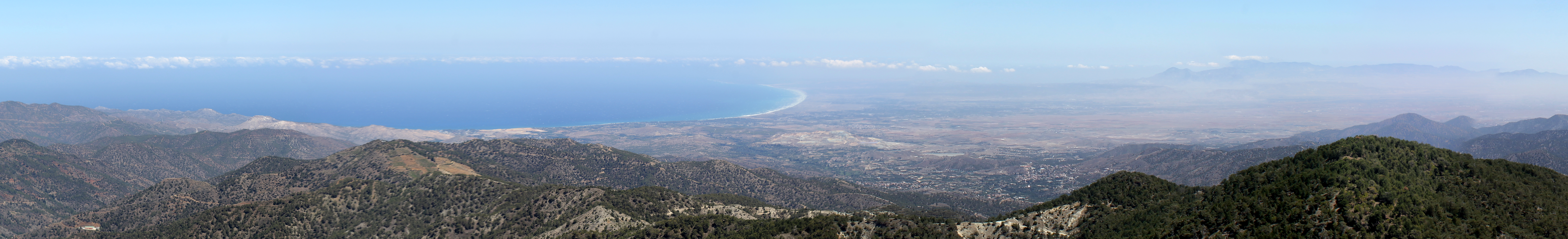
Panoramic view of the Güzelyurt District, and Morphou Bay as seen from the Troodos mountains.

Northern Cyprus has an area of 3,355 square kilometres (1,295 mi^{2}), which amounts to around a third of the island. 75 kilometres (40 nautical miles) to the north of Northern Cyprus lies Turkey with Syria lying 97 kilometres (52 1/2 nmi) to the east. It lies between latitudes 34° and 36° N, and longitudes 32° and 35° E.

The coastline of Northern Cyprus features two bays: the Morphou Bay and the Famagusta Bay, and there are four capes: Cape Apostolos Andreas, Cape Kormakitis, Cape Zeytin and Cape Kasa, with Cape Apostolos Andreas being the endpoint of the Karpaz Peninsula. The narrow Kyrenia mountain range lies along the northern coastline, and the highest point in Northern Cyprus, Mount Selvili, lies in this mountain range with an altitude of 1,024 metres (3,360 ft). The Mesaoria plain, extending from the Güzelyurt district to the eastern coastline is another defining landscape. The Mesaoria plains consist of plain fields and small hills, and is crossed by several seasonal streams. The eastern part of the plain is used for dry agriculture, such as the cultivation of wheat and barley, and are therefore predominantly green in the winter and spring, while it turns yellow and brown in the summer.

56.7% of the land in Northern Cyprus is agriculturally viable.

=== Climate ===
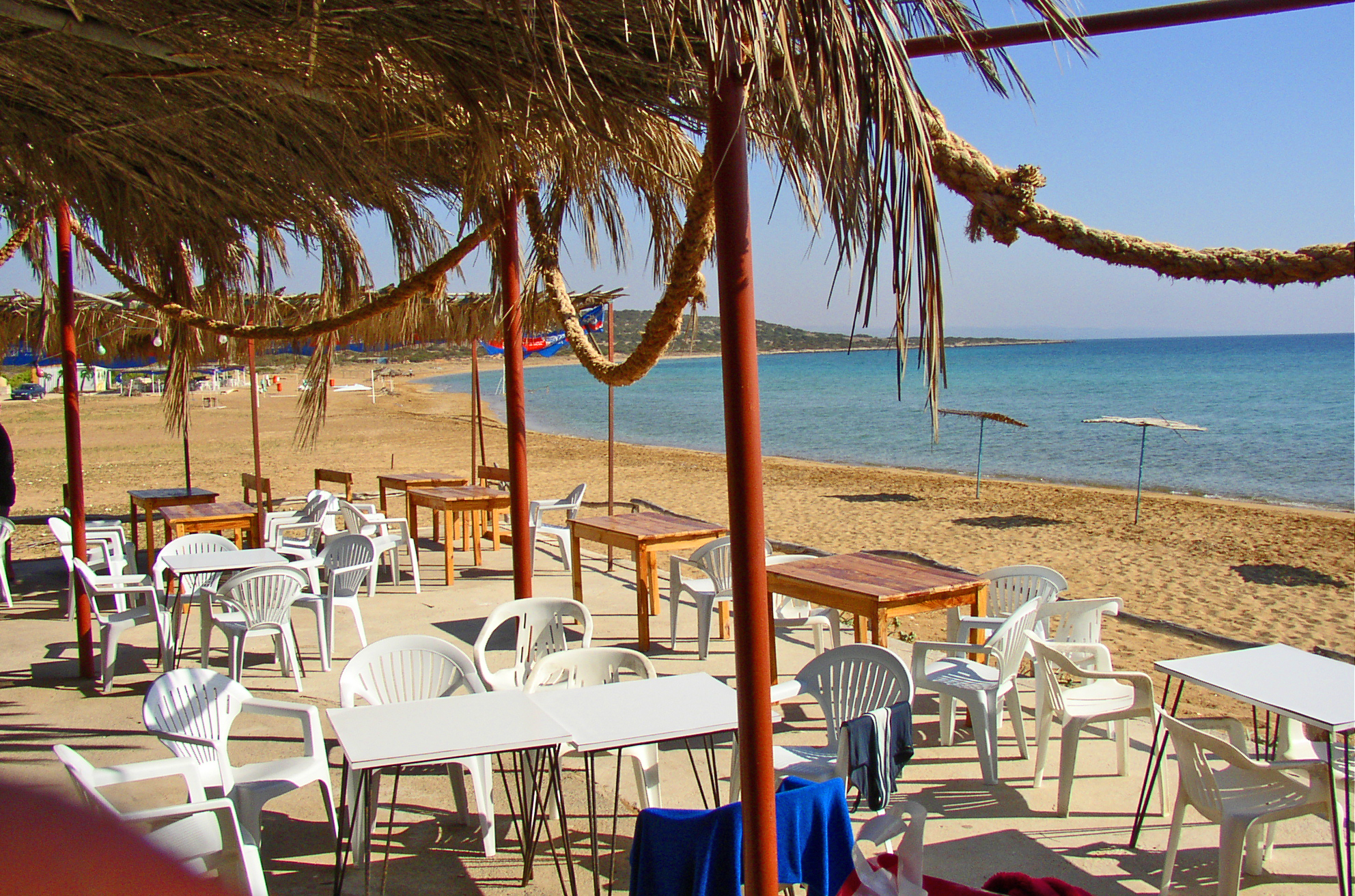
Beach near Mehmetcik, İskele District

The winter in Northern Cyprus is cool and rainy, particularly between December and February; those three months see 60% of the region's annual rainfall. These rains produce winter torrents that fill most of the rivers, which typically dry up as the year progresses. Snow has been known to fall on the Kyrenia Range, but seldom elsewhere in spite of low night temperatures. The short spring is characterised by unstable weather, occasional heavy storms and the "meltem", or westerly wind. Summer is hot and dry enough to turn low-lying lands on the island brown. Parts of the island experience the "Poyraz", a north-westerly wind, or the sirocco, a wind from Africa, which is dry and dusty. Summer is followed by a short, turbulent autumn.

Climate conditions on the island vary by geographical factors. The Mesaoria Plain, cut off from the summer breezes and from much of the humidity of the sea, may reach temperature peaks of 40 to 45 °C (104 to 113 °F). Humidity rises at the Karpaz Peninsula. Humidity and water temperature, 16 to 28 °C (61 to 82 °F), combine to stabilise coastal weather, which does not experience inland extremes. The Southern Range blocks air currents that bring rain and atmospheric humidity from the south-west, diminishing both on its eastern side.

=== Biodiversity ===
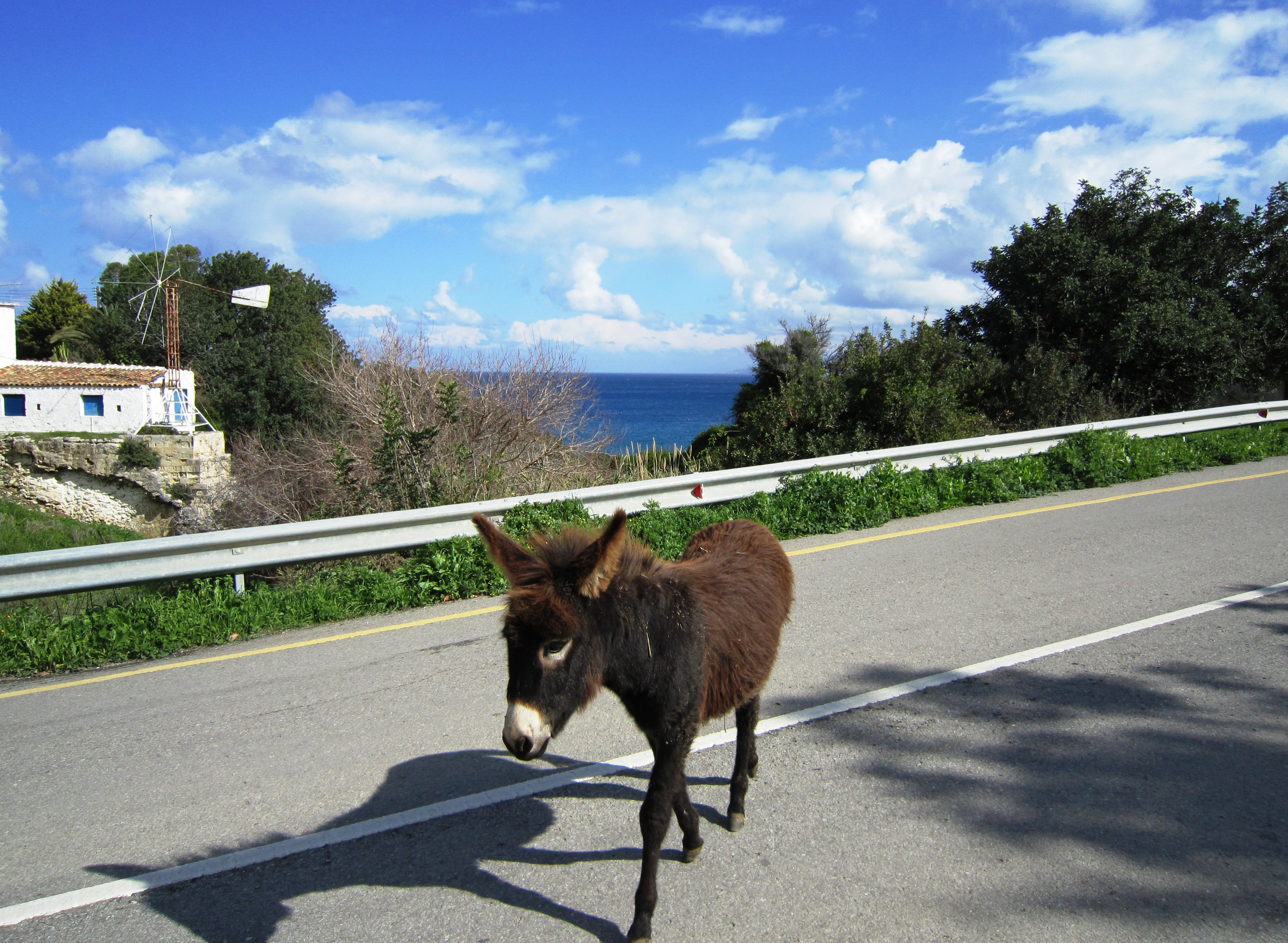
Wild Cyprus donkeys inhabit the mainly remote northeastern region of the İskele District.

A relatively unspoiled part of the Mediterranean Basin biodiversity hotspot, Northern Cyprus has considerable ecological diversity, containing a variety of terrestrial habitats. Its flora includes around 1900 plant species, of which 19 are endemic to Northern Cyprus. Even in the urban areas, there is a lot of diversity: a study conducted on the banks of the Pedieos river around Nicosia found more than 750 different plant species. Among these species are 30 of the orchid species that are endemic to Cyprus. An endangered species that is the subject of folk tales and myths is the sea daffodil, found on the sandy beaches and endangered due to the disruption of their habitats.

The medoş tulip (Tulipa cypria) is a notable species that is endemic to Northern Cyprus; it is only found in the villages of Tepebaşı/Diorios and Avtepe/Ayios Simeon, and is celebrated with an annual festival.

In the national park in the Karpaz Peninsula around Cape Apostolos Andreas, there is a population of around 1,000 wild Cyprus donkeys. These donkeys, under the protection of the Turkish Cypriot government, are free to wander in herds over an area of 300 square kilometres (120 square miles) The donkeys have earned a strong image for the peninsula, which is also home to a rich fauna and relatively big forests. The beaches of Northern Cyprus also include sites where hundreds of loggerhead turtles and green turtles lay eggs, which hatch at the end of the summer, followed by observers.

== Government and politics ==
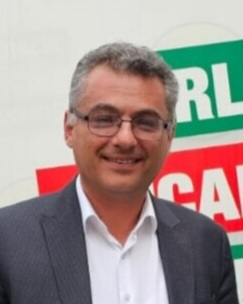
Tufan Erhürman, President of Northern Cyprus

The politics of Northern Cyprus takes place in a framework of a semi-presidential representative democratic republic, whereby the president is head of state and the prime minister head of government, and of a multi-party system. Executive power is exercised by the government. Legislative power is vested in both the government and the Assembly of the Republic. The Judiciary is independent of the executive and the legislature.

The president is elected for a five-year term and is currently Tufan Erhürman. The current prime minister is Ünal Üstel. The legislature is the Assembly of the Republic, which has 50 members elected by proportional representation from six electoral districts. In the elections of January 2018, the right-wing National Unity Party won the most seats in the Assembly, and the current government is a coalition of the National Unity Party and the centrist People's Party.

Due to Northern Cyprus's isolation and heavy reliance on Turkish support, Turkey has a high level of influence over the country's politics. This has led to some experts characterising it as an effective puppet state of Turkey. Other experts, however, have pointed out to the independent nature of elections and appointments in Northern Cyprus and disputes between the Turkish Cypriot and Turkish governments, concluding that "puppet state" is not an accurate description for Northern Cyprus.

=== Administrative divisions ===
Northern Cyprus is divided into six districts: Lefkoşa, Gazimağusa, Girne, Güzelyurt, İskele and Lefke. Lefke District was established by separation from the Güzelyurt District in 2016. In addition, there are further twelve sub-districts divided between the five larger districts and twenty-eight municipalities.

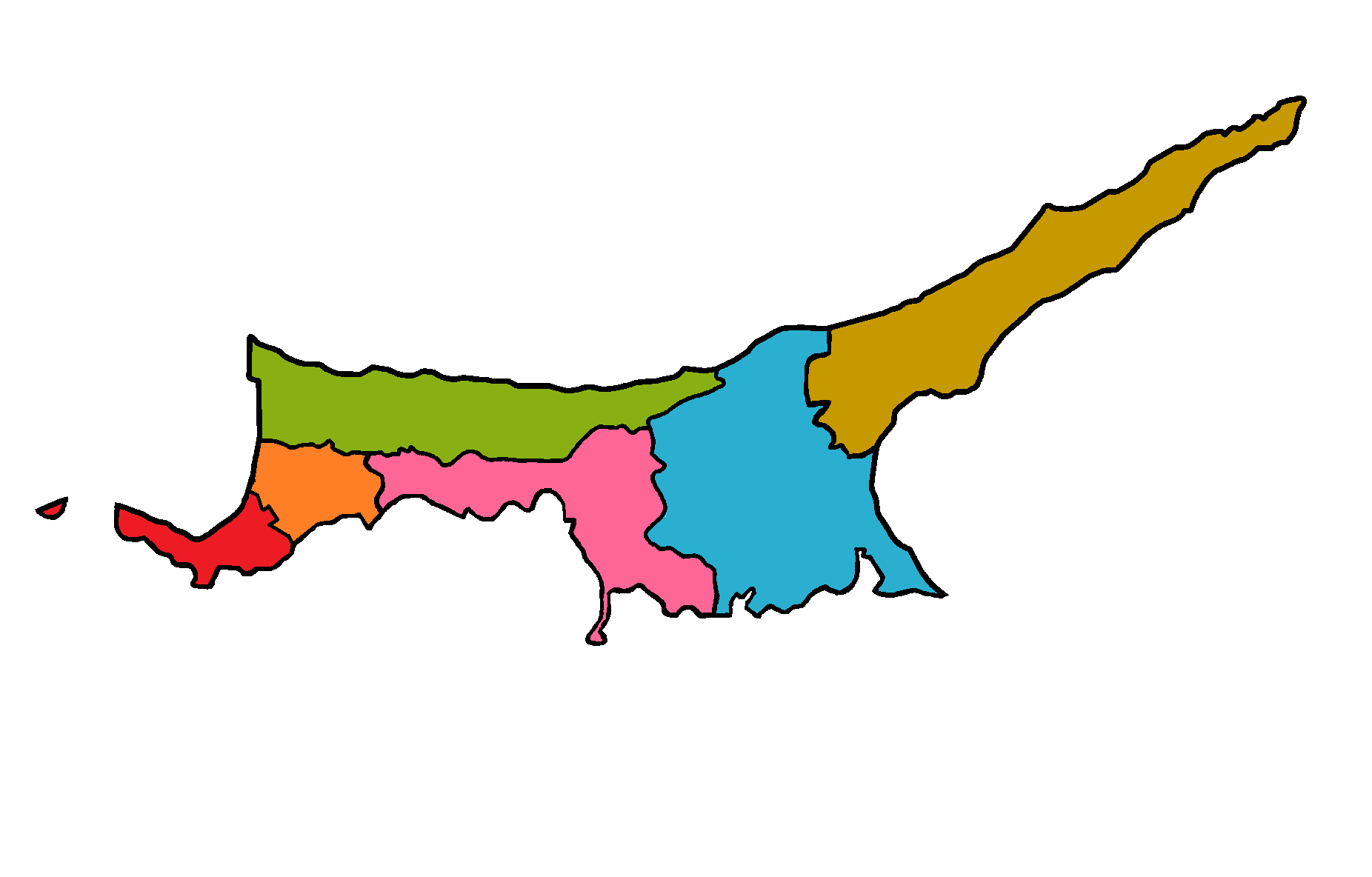

=== International status and foreign relations ===
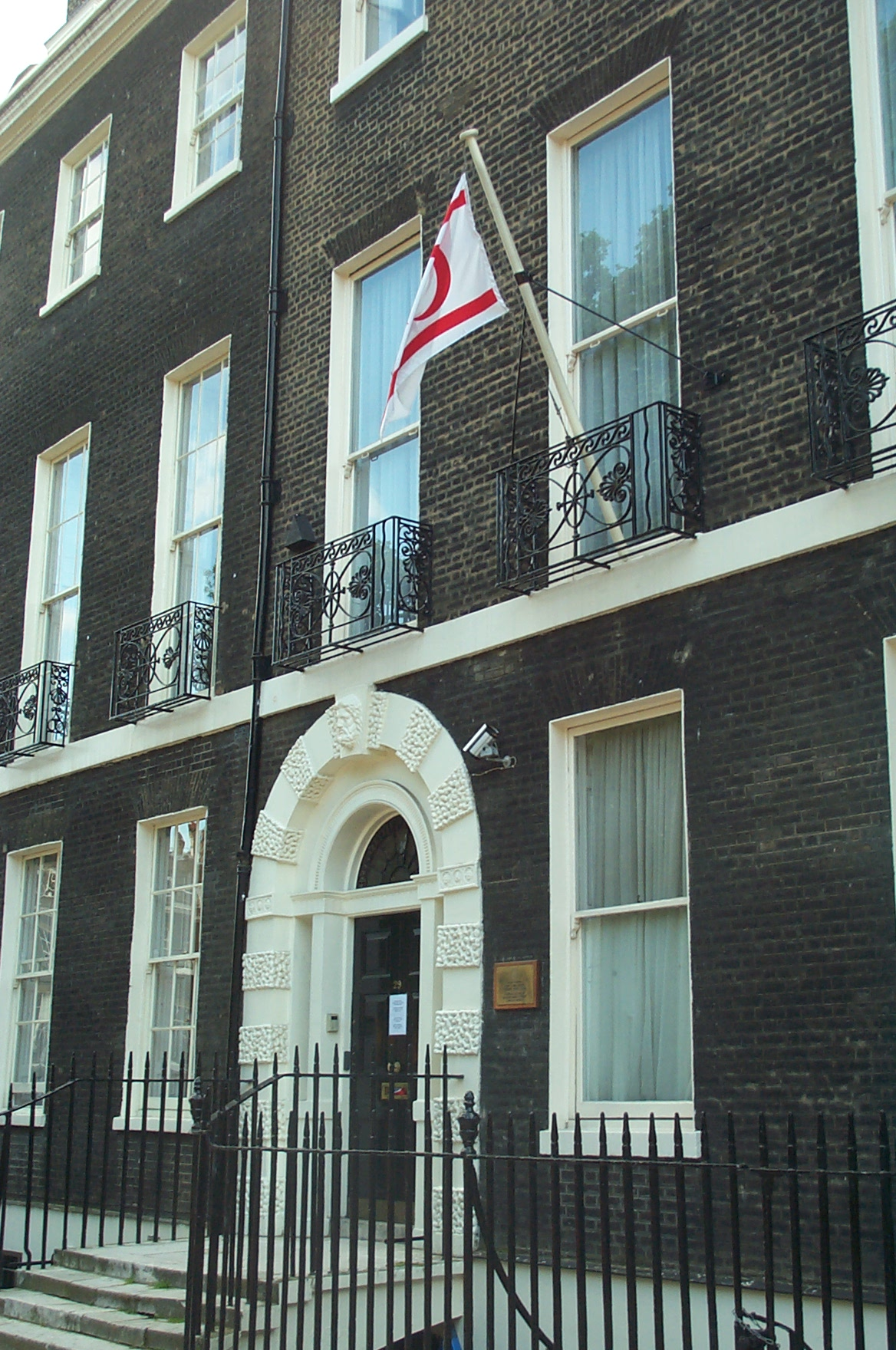
London office of the Turkish Republic of Northern Cyprus, Bedford Square

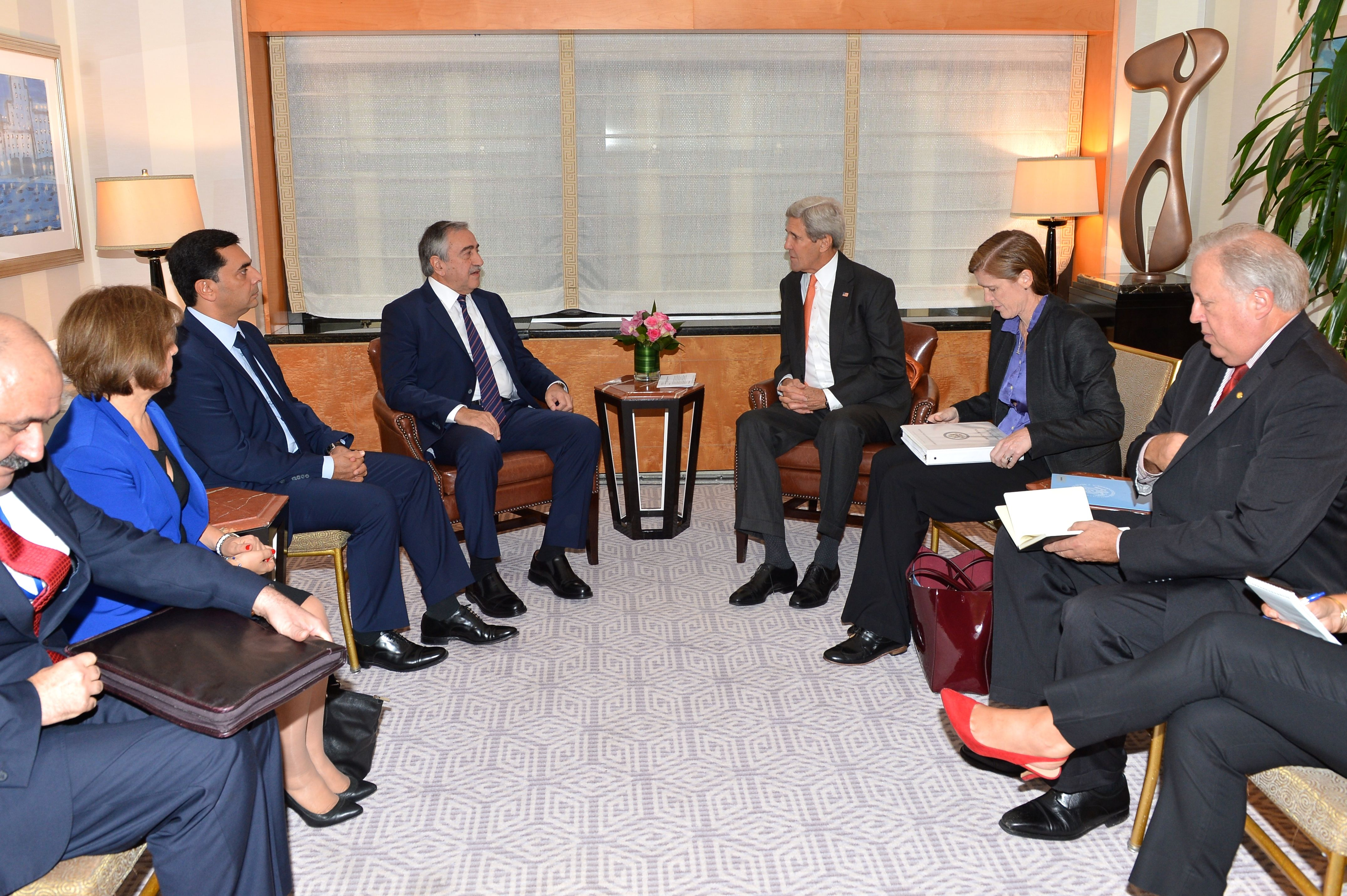
Mustafa Akıncı with U.S. Secretary of State John Kerry, 2 October 2015

No country other than the Republic of Turkey has officially recognised Northern Cyprus as a sovereign state. The United Nations considers it a territory of the Republic of Cyprus under Turkish occupation. Pakistan and Bangladesh reportedly planned to recognize Northern Cyprus as a sovereign state shortly after its declaration of independence, but were persuaded to withhold recognition under the threat that they would risk losing US foreign aid. The United Nations considers the declaration of independence by Northern Cyprus as legally invalid, as enunciated in several of its resolutions.

In the wake of the April 2004 referendum on the United Nations Annan Plan, and in view of the support of the Turkish Cypriot community for the plan, the European Union made pledges towards ending the isolation of Northern Cyprus. These included measures for trade and €259 million in aid. A pledge by the EU to lift the embargo on Northern Cyprus in the wake of the Annan Plan referendums has been blocked by the Greek Cypriot government in the European Council.

In 2004, the Organisation of Islamic Co-operation upgraded the delegation of the Turkish Cypriot Muslim community from "observer community" (1979) to that of a constituent state with the designation "Turkish Cypriot State", making Northern Cyprus an observer member of the organisation. A number of high-profile formal meetings have also taken place between Turkish Cypriot presidents and various foreign leaders and politicians.

In 2004, the Parliamentary Assembly of the Council of Europe gave observer status to the representatives of Turkish Cypriot community. Since then, Northern Cyprus's representatives have actively participated in all PACE activities without voting rights.

The European Union considers the area not under effective control of the Republic of Cyprus as EU territory under Turkish military occupation and thus indefinitely exempt from EU legislation until a settlement has been found. The status of Northern Cyprus has become a recurrent issue especially during talks in the 2010s for Turkey's membership of the EU where the division of the island is seen as a major stumbling block in Turkey's road to membership and general EU-Turkey relations.

The Nakhchivan Autonomous Republic of Azerbaijan has issued a resolution recognising the independence of Northern Cyprus. As a result of the Nagorno-Karabakh issue, however, Azerbaijan itself has not recognised North Cyprus.

Turkish Cypriots have been applying for decades for passports issued by Cyprus. When the entry points with the Republic of Cyprus were closed, the applications were made either through middlemen or through consulates and embassies of Cyprus in other countries. A yearly increase in the number of applications for such passports of 10–15% was observed in years prior to 2001, when the rate greatly increased and 817 were issued in the first eight months of 2001 as compared to 448 for the whole of 2000. After the opening of the borders with the Republic of Cyprus, Turkish Cypriots started line-ups applying for Cypriot passports by visiting the Republic of Cyprus and showing proof of their Cypriot ancestry.

There are seven border crossings between Northern Cyprus and the Republic of Cyprus. Since May 2004, some tourists have taken to flying to the Republic of Cyprus directly then crossing the green line to holiday in Northern Cyprus.

On 21 September 2011, Turkey and Northern Cyprus signed an EEZ border agreement in New York.

In October 2012, Northern Cyprus became an observer member of the Economic Cooperation Organization under the name "Turkish Cypriot State". In November 2022, the Turkish Republic of Northern Cyprus was admitted to the Organization of Turkic States as observer member.

=== Military ===
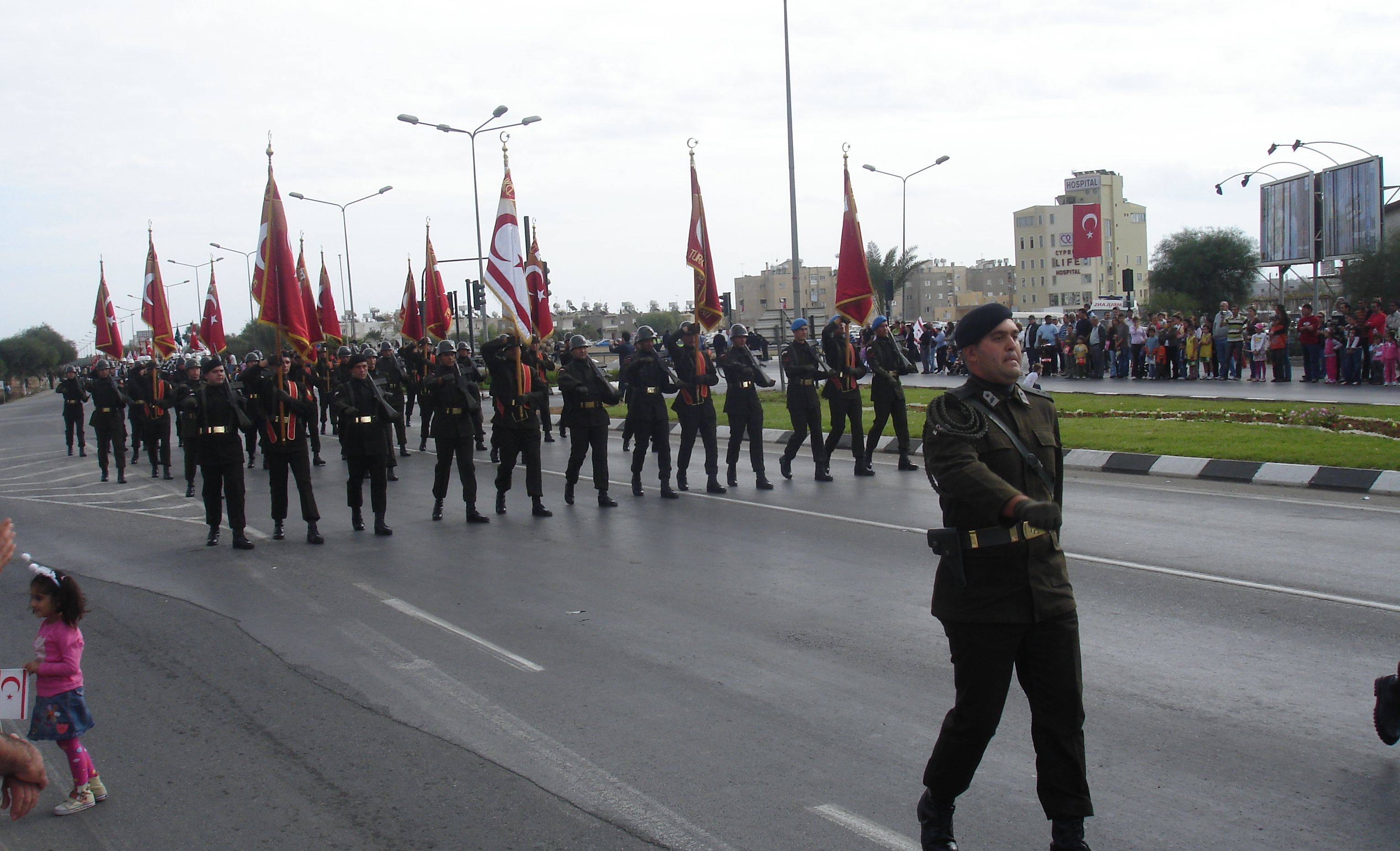
Turkish Cypriot soldiers of the Security Forces Command perform during a Republic Day parade.

The Security Forces Command consists of an 8,000 strong force primarily made up of conscripted Turkish Cypriot males between the ages of 18 and 40. There is also an additional reserve force which consists of about 10,000 first-line and 16,000 second-line troops conscripted up to the age of 50. The Security Forces Command is lightly armed and heavily dependent on its mainland Turkish allies, from which it draws much of its officer corps. It is led by a Brigadier General drawn from the Turkish Army. It acts essentially as a gendarmerie charged with protection of the border of Northern Cyprus from Greek Cypriot incursions and maintaining internal security within Northern Cyprus.

In addition, the mainland Turkish Armed Forces maintains the Cyprus Turkish Peace Force which consists of around 30,000–40,000 troops drawn from the 9th Turkish Army Corps and comprising two divisions, the 28th and 39th. It is equipped with a substantial number of US-made M48 Patton main battle tanks and artillery weapons. The Turkish Air Force, Turkish Navy and Turkish Coast Guard also have a presence in Northern Cyprus. Although formally part of Turkish 4th Army, headquartered in İzmir, the sensitivities of the Cyprus situation means that the commander of the Cyprus Turkish Peace Force also reports directly to the Turkish General Staff in Ankara. The Cyprus Turkish Peace Force is deployed principally along the Green Line and in locations where hostile amphibious landings might take place.

The presence of the mainland Turkish military in Cyprus is highly controversial, having been denounced as an occupation force by the Republic of Cyprus and the international community. Several United Nations Security Council resolutions have called on the Turkish forces to withdraw.

=== Human rights ===
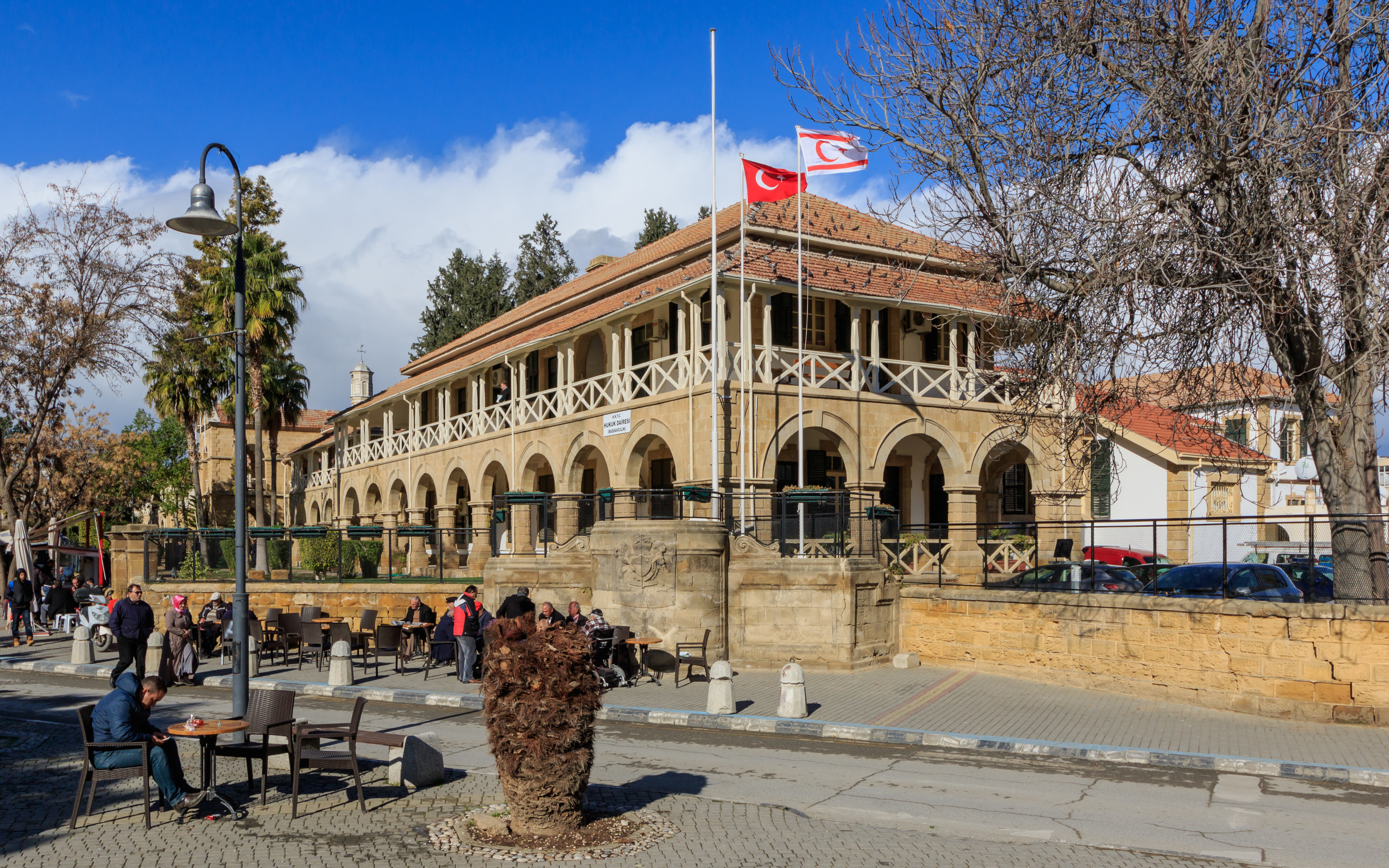
The law courts building in North Nicosia

In January 2011, The Report of the Office of the United Nations High Commissioner for Human Rights on the question of Human Rights in Cyprus noted that the ongoing division of Cyprus continues to affect human rights throughout the island "including freedom of movement, human rights pertaining to the question of missing persons, discrimination, the right to life, freedom of religion, and economic, social and cultural rights."

Freedom House has classified the perceived level of democratic and political freedom in Northern Cyprus as "free" since 2000 in its Freedom in the World report. The 2016 ranking was "free" with the scores (1: most free, 7: least free) political rights: 2/7, civil liberties: 2/7 and aggregate score: 79/100. Reporters Without Borders' World Press Freedom Index ranked Northern Cyprus 76th among 180 countries in 2015.

The Greek Cypriot and Maronite communities, numbering 343 and 118 respectively as of 2014, are denied the right to vote in presidential, parliamentary and municipal elections or run for office. Maronites do elect the leader of their village, whilst Greek Cypriots have two appointed leaders, one by the Turkish Cypriot government and the other by the Republic of Cyprus.

World Happiness Report 2016 of United Nations' Sustainable Development Solutions Network (SDSN) ranked Northern Cyprus 62nd among 157 countries. Gallup Healthways Well-Being Index of 2014 ranked Northern Cyprus 49th among 145 countries.

Northern Cyprus received 153 asylum applications during 2011–2014 according to United Nations High Commissioner for Refugees (UNHCR).

== Economy ==
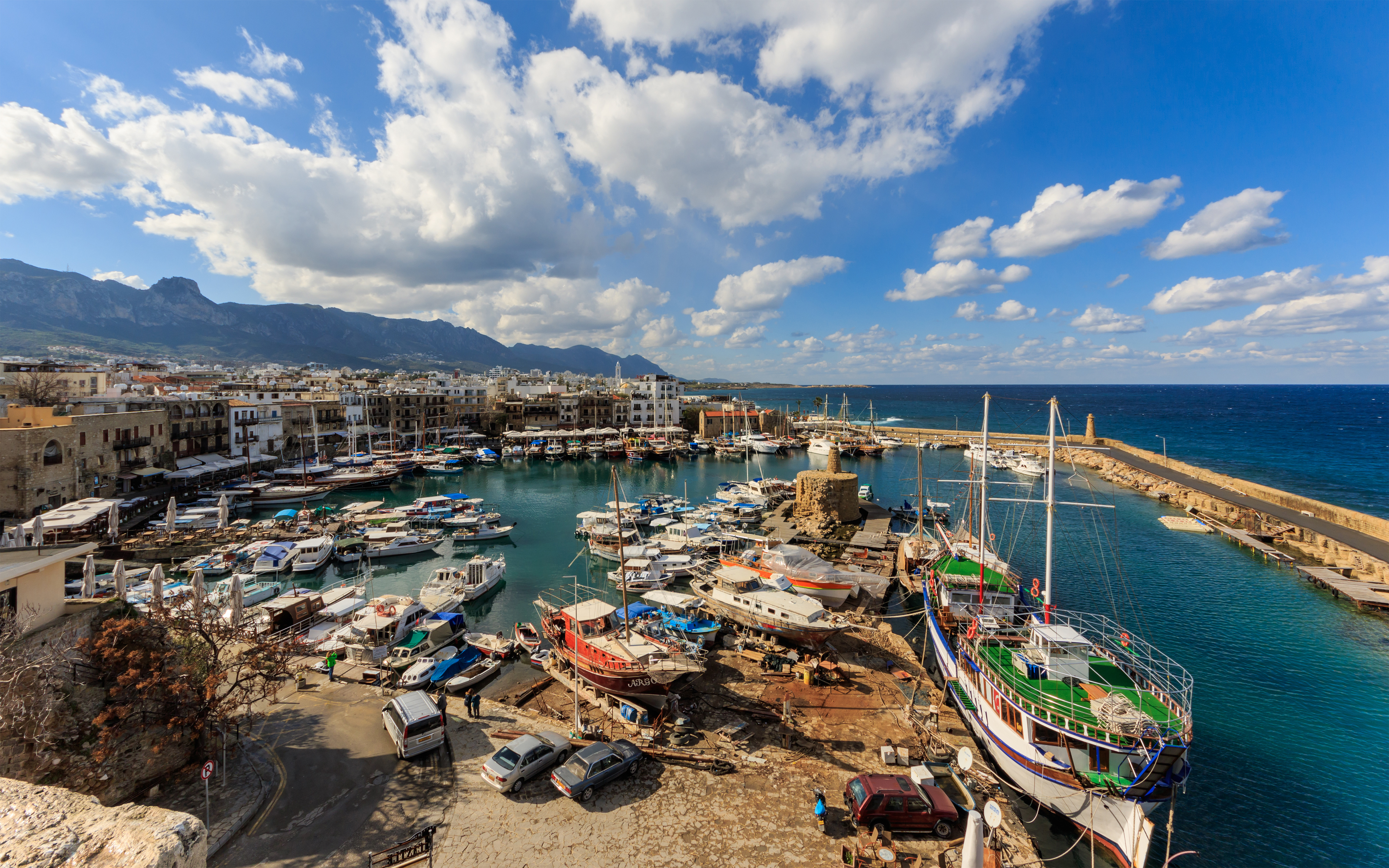
Kyrenia (Girne) is one of the main tourist resorts in Northern Cyprus. Tourism is one of the dominant sectors of the Northern Cyprus' economy.

The economy of Northern Cyprus is dominated by the services sector (69% of GDP in 2007) which includes the public sector, trade, tourism and education. The revenues gained by the education sector in 2011 was $400 million. Industry (light manufacturing) contributes 22% of GDP and agriculture 9%. The economy of Northern Cyprus is based on a free market approach and it became the top country in Europe in entrepreneurial intent to start a new business in 2014.

Economic development is adversely affected by the continuing Cyprus problem. Northern Cyprus is under an international embargo as the Republic of Cyprus, as the internationally recognised authority, has declared airports and ports in the area not under its effective control closed. All UN member states other than Turkey respect the closure of those ports and airports. As a result, Northern Cyprus is heavily dependent on Turkish economic support, and is still dependent on monetary transfers from the Turkish government.

Northern Cyprus uses the Turkish lira as legal tender rather than the euro, which links its economy to that of Turkey. Since the Republic of Cyprus joined the Eurozone and the movement of peoples between the north and south has become more free, the euro is also in wide circulation. Exports and imports have to go via Turkey; while the European Union promised an opening up of the ports after the Annan plan; this was blocked by the Republic of Cyprus and exporting through the south, while technically possible, remains impractical.

Despite the constraints imposed by the lack of international recognition, the nominal GDP growth rates of the economy in 2001–2005 were 5.4%, 6.9%, 11.4%, 15.4% and 10.6%, respectively. The real GDP growth rate in 2007 was estimated at 2%. This growth has been buoyed by the relative stability of the Turkish Lira and a boom in the education and construction sectors. Between 2002 and 2007, gross national product per capita more than tripled, from US$4,409 in 2002 to US$16,158 (in current U.S. dollars). The growth continued through the 2010s, with real growth rates of 3.7%, 3.9%, 1.8% and 1.1% respectively in 2010–2013. The unemployment rate declined through the 2010s and was at 8.3% in 2014.

In 2011, North Cyprus sold electricity to the Republic of Cyprus following an explosion in the southern part of the island which affected a large power station. The Northern Cyprus Water Supply Project, completed in 2015, is aimed at delivering water for drinking and irrigation from southern Turkey via a pipeline under the Mediterranean Sea.

International telephone calls are routed via a Turkish dialling code (+90 392) as Northern Cyprus has neither its own country code nor official ITU prefix. Similarly with the internet Northern Cyprus has no top level domain of its own and is under the Turkish second-level domain .nc.tr. Items of mail must be addressed 'via Mersin 10, TURKEY' as the Universal Postal Union does not recognise Northern Cyprus as a separate entity. Amateur radio operators sometimes use callsigns beginning with "1B", but these have no standing for awards or other operating credit.

=== Tourism ===
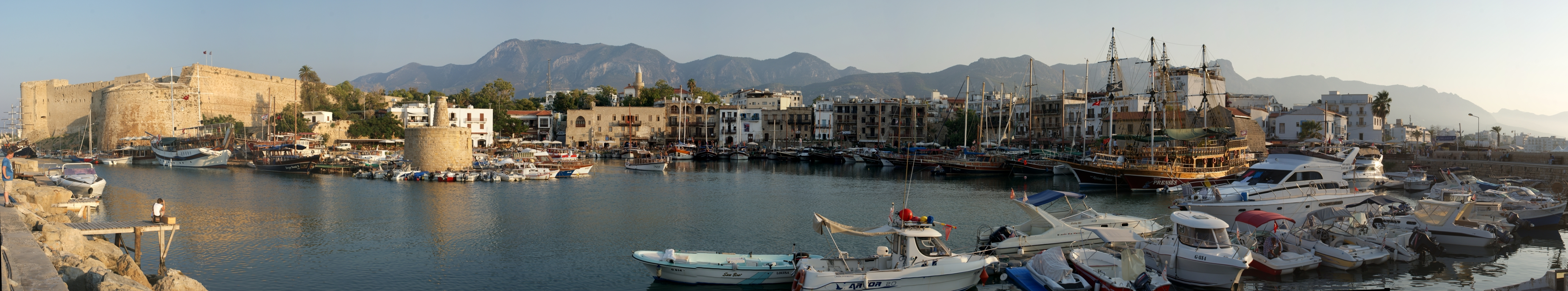
Panoramic view of the Kyrenia Harbour, with the Venetian-era Kyrenia Castle on the far left, and the Kyrenia Mountains in the background

Tourism is considered one of the driving sectors of the Turkish Cypriot economy. The country received over 1.1 million tourists in 2012, when hotels and restaurants generated an income of $328 million and constituted 8.5% of the GDP. Accommodation and catering created more than 10,000 jobs in the same year. The tourism sector has seen great development in the 2000s and 2010s, with the number of tourists more than doubling, increased investment and hotel construction; official estimates of income derived from tourism were around 700 million US dollars in 2013 and the total bed capacity was estimated to be around 20,000.

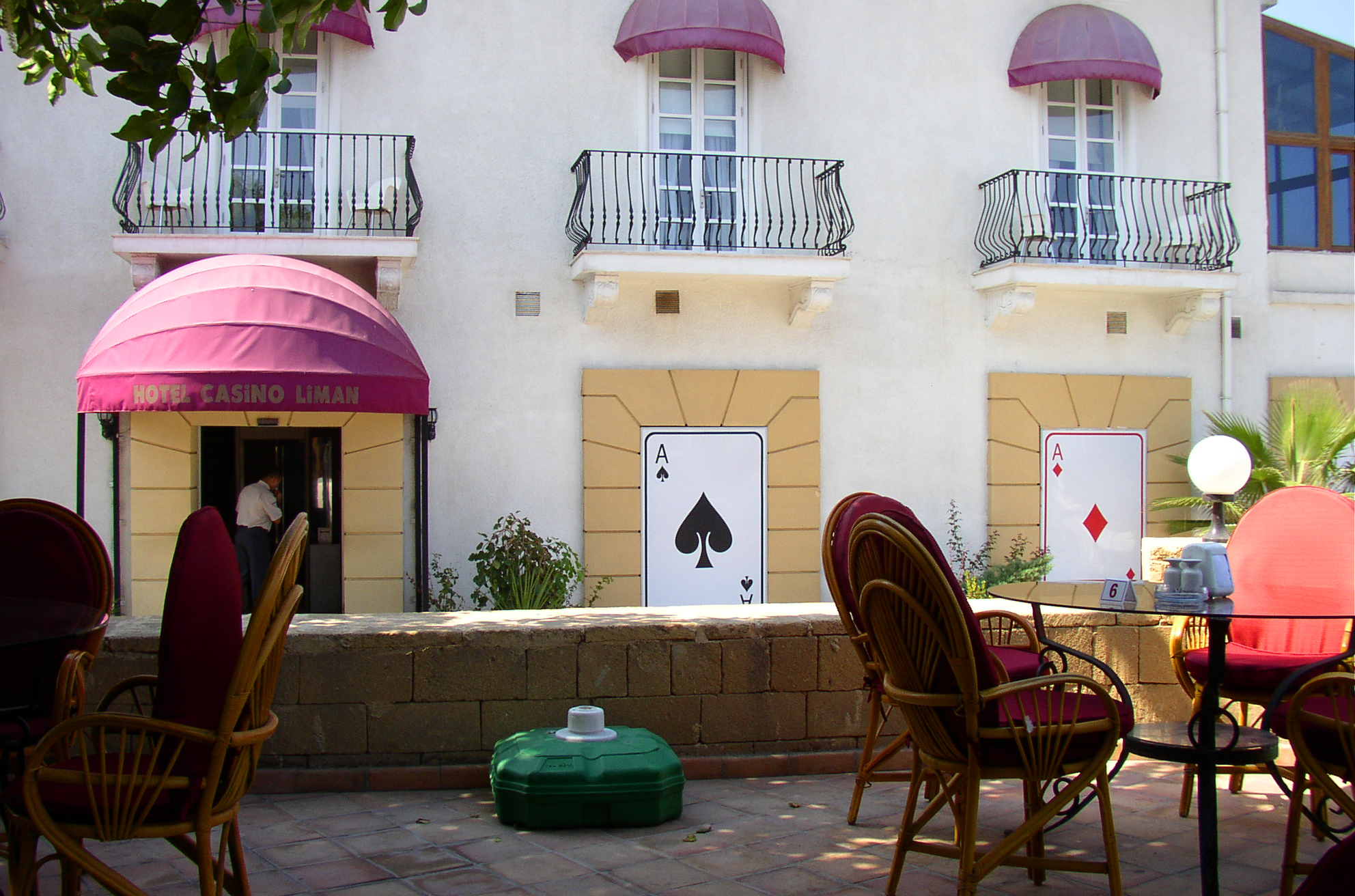
Casino tourism is one of the major sectors of the North Cyprus economy.

Kyrenia is considered the capital of tourism in Northern Cyprus, with its numerous hotels, entertainment facilities, vibrant nightlife and shopping areas. In 2012, 62.7% of the visitors in Northern Cyprus stayed in the Girne District during their visit. Out of the 145 hotels in Northern Cyprus, 99 were in the Girne District in 2013.

Northern Cyprus has traditionally been an attraction for beach holidays, partly thanks to its reputation as an unspoiled area. Its mild climate, rich history and nature are seen as sources of attraction. A significant sector of eco-tourism has been developed in Northern Cyprus, as tourists visit it for bird watching, cycling, walking and observing flowers in the wild. It is praised for its relative safety, and especially for the Karpass Peninsula, its well-preservation. The peninsula is home to several sorts of tourism: it hosts the Bafra Tourism Area as a center for beach-goers, where four luxurious and large hotels were built until 2014, several facilities and regular festivals that highlight its rural qualities and exhibit local traditions, a remote natural park, the Kantara Castle attracting sightseers, and a marina that was built to host international yachts and boats, along with large facilities.

Casino tourism has also grown to become a significant contribution to the economy in Northern Cyprus. They were first opened in the 1990s, and have since become very popular with visitors from Turkey and the rest of the island, where casinos are banned. This has led to huge investments in the casino sector. However, the sector has been criticised due to claims of its lack of benefits for the small and middle-scale business and shop owners. The "nightclubs" that have been established for prostitution attract sex tourism to Northern Cyprus and the industry has been described as a "civilized one", despite the sex workers being described as "vulnerable to abuse".

=== Infrastructure ===
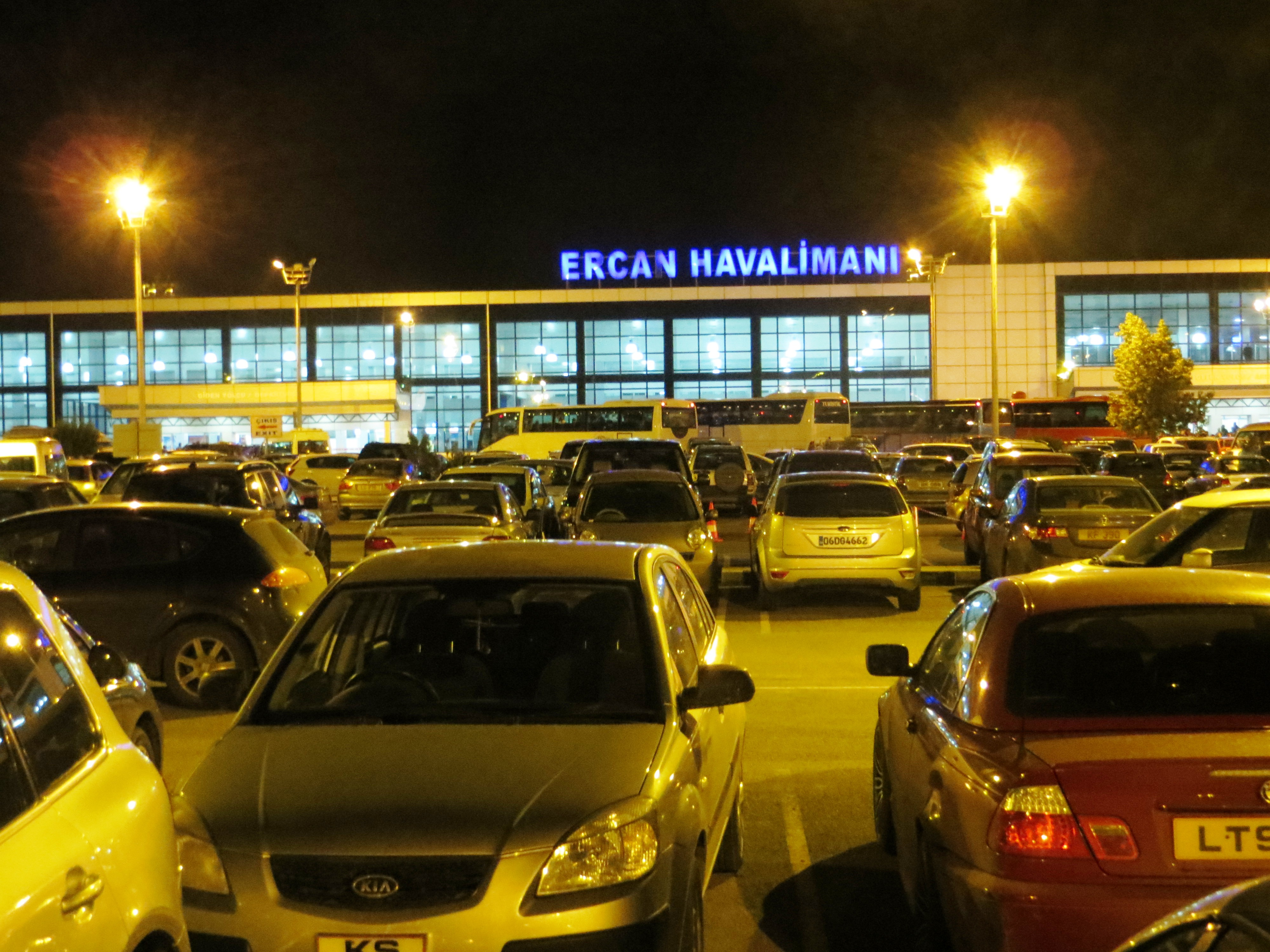
The Ercan International Airport serves as the main port of entry into Northern Cyprus.

The share of the transport and communications industry in the GDP of Northern Cyprus is constantly varying; it decreased from 12.1% in 2008 to 8.5% in 2011, but rose again to 9.3% in 2012.

Air transport is a major route of entry into Northern Cyprus. The country is home to two airports, the Ercan International Airport and the Geçitkale Airport, of which only Ercan is currently functioning. The Ercan airport saw an important renovation in the 2010s that greatly increased its passenger traffic, it was used by 1.76 million passengers in the first seven months of 2014 alone. Non-stop flights are only available from multiple points in Turkey through a number of Turkish carriers. Direct scheduled and charter flights take place from other countries, but with mandatory stopovers in Turkey. 600 charter flights were scheduled for 2013. Scheduled destinations include cities such as London and Manchester, while charter flight destinations include cities such as Berlin and Ljubljana.

Direct flights to Northern Cyprus and the trade traffic through the Northern Cypriot ports are restricted as part of the embargo on Northern Cypriot ports. The airports of Geçitkale and Ercan are only recognised as legal ports of entry by Turkey and Azerbaijan. Direct charter flights between Poland and North Cyprus started on 20 June 2011. The seaports in Famagusta and Kyrenia have been declared closed to all shipping by the Republic of Cyprus since 1974. By agreement between Northern Cyprus and Syria, there was a ship tour between Famagusta and Latakia, Syria before the outbreak of the Syrian Civil War. Since the opening of the Green Line Turkish Cypriot residents are allowed to trade through ports recognised by the Republic of Cyprus.

With the lack of a railway system, the country's highways are used for transport between major cities. In the 21st century, these highways were upgraded into dual carriageways, with some roads in the Karpass area still being upgraded as of 2015. Northern Cyprus has around 7,000 kilometres (4,300 miles) of roads, with two thirds of these roads paved. Recent constructions included the construction of a Northern Coast Highway, which was hailed as a major incentive for economic development.

The electricity grid is connected to the Republic of Cyprus, and an interconnector with Turkey would decrease reliance on fossil fuels.

== Demographics ==
Ethnic groups of Northern Cyprus (2006 census)
1. Turks (99.2%)
2. Greeks (0.20%)
3. English (0.20%)
4. Maronites (0.10%)
5. Other (0.30%)

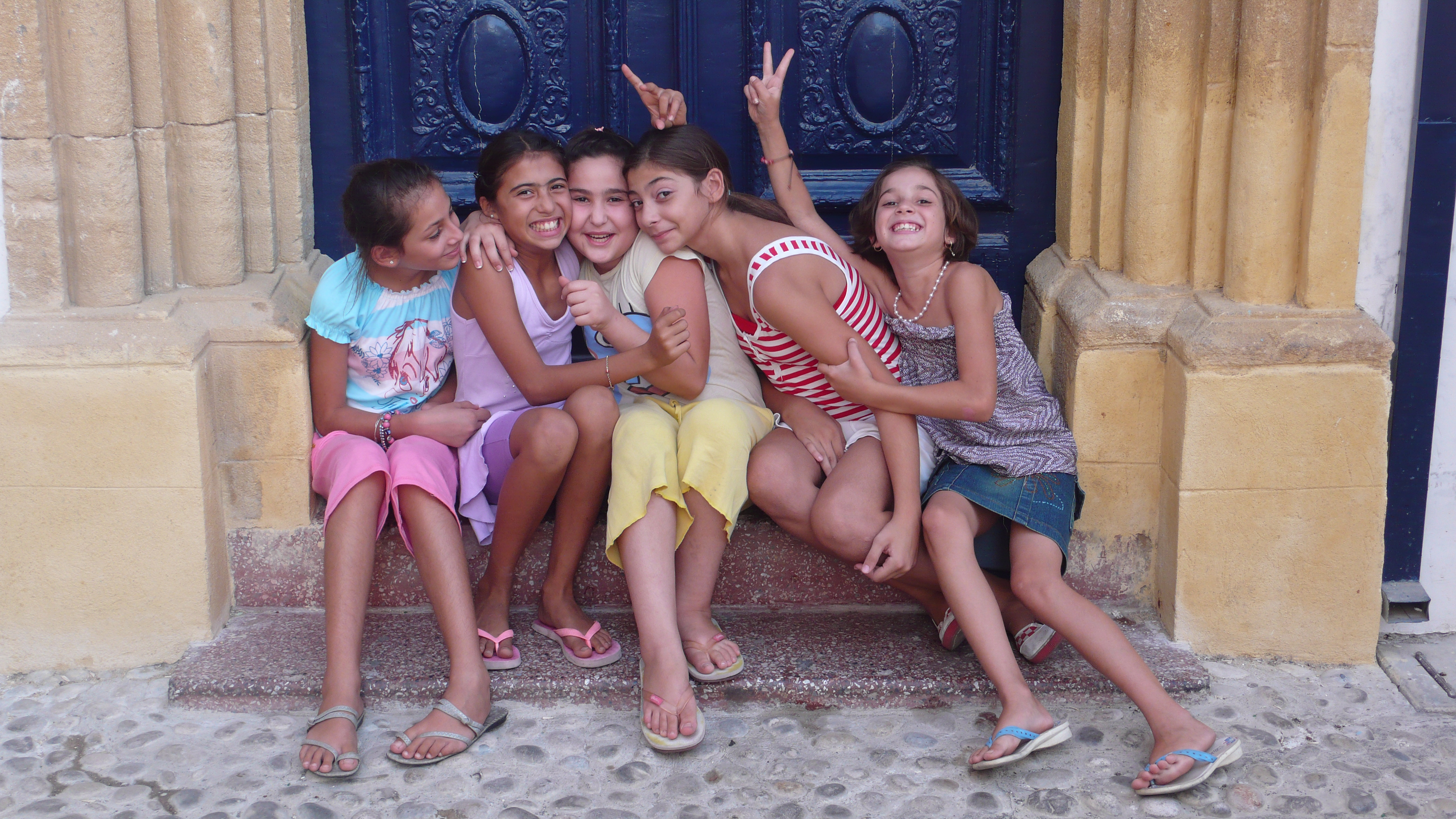
Turkish Cypriot children in the walled part of North Nicosia

Northern Cyprus's first official census was performed in 1996. The population recorded was 200,587. The second census, carried out in 2006, revealed the population of Northern Cyprus to be 265,100, of which majority is composed of indigenous Turkish Cypriots (including refugees from Southern Cyprus) and settlers from Turkey. Of the 178,000 Turkish Cypriot citizens, 82% are native Cypriots (145,000). Of the 45,000 people born to non-Cypriot parentage, nearly 40% (17,000) were born in Cyprus. The figure for non-citizens, including students, guest workers and temporary residents stood at 78,000 people.

The third official census of Northern Cyprus was carried out in 2011, made under the auspices of UN observers. It returned a total population of 294,906. These results were disputed by some political parties, labour unions and local newspapers. The government was accused of deliberately under-counting the population, after apparently giving an estimate of 700,000 before the census, in order to demand financial help from Turkey. One source claims that the population in the north has reached 500,000, split between 50% Turkish Cypriots and 50% Turkish settlers or Cypriot-born children of such settlers. Researcher Mete Hatay has written that such reports are "wildly speculative" and are picked up by opposition parties for political benefit, which resulted in reports in the south. Such reports have never been scientifically or statistically scrutinised, despite opportunities of opposition parties to do so using the electoral rolls in their possession, thereby continuing a "war of numbers".

The Government of Northern Cyprus estimates that the 1983 population of Northern Cyprus was 155,521. Estimates by the government of the Republic of Cyprus from 2001 place the population at 200,000, of which 80–89,000 are Turkish Cypriots and 109,000–117,000 are designated as Turkish settlers by the Republic of Cyprus. An island-wide census in 1960 indicated the number of Turkish Cypriots as 102,000 and Greek Cypriots as 450,000. As of 2005, the settlers constituted no more than 25% of the electorate in Northern Cyprus. The degree of the integration of mainland Turks to the Turkish Cypriot community varies; some identify as Turkish Cypriots and have culturally integrated, while some embrace a Turkish identity.

Northern Cyprus is almost entirely Turkish-speaking. English, however, is widely spoken as a second language.

There are 644 Greek Cypriots living in Rizokarpaso (Dipkarpaz) and 364 Maronites in Kormakitis. 162,000 Greek Cypriots were forcibly evicted from their homes in the North by the invading force of the Turkish army. Rizokarpaso is the home of the biggest Greek-speaking population in the north. The Greek-Cypriot inhabitants are still supplied by the UN, and Greek-Cypriot products are consequently available in some shops.

Largest cities or towns in Northern Cyprus TRNC 2011 Population and Housing Census
Rank	Name	District	Pop.
1	North Nicosia	Lefkoşa	61,378
2	Famagusta	Gazimağusa	40,920
3	Kyrenia	Girne	33,207
4	Morphou	Güzelyurt	18,946
5	Gönyeli	Lefkoşa	17,277
6	Kythrea	Lefkoşa	11,895
7	Lefka	Lefke	11,091
8	Dikomo	Girne	9,120
9	Trikomo	İskele	7,906
10	Lapithos	Girne	7,839

=== Religion ===
Northern Cyprus Religions
1. Islam (99.0%)
2. other (1.00%)

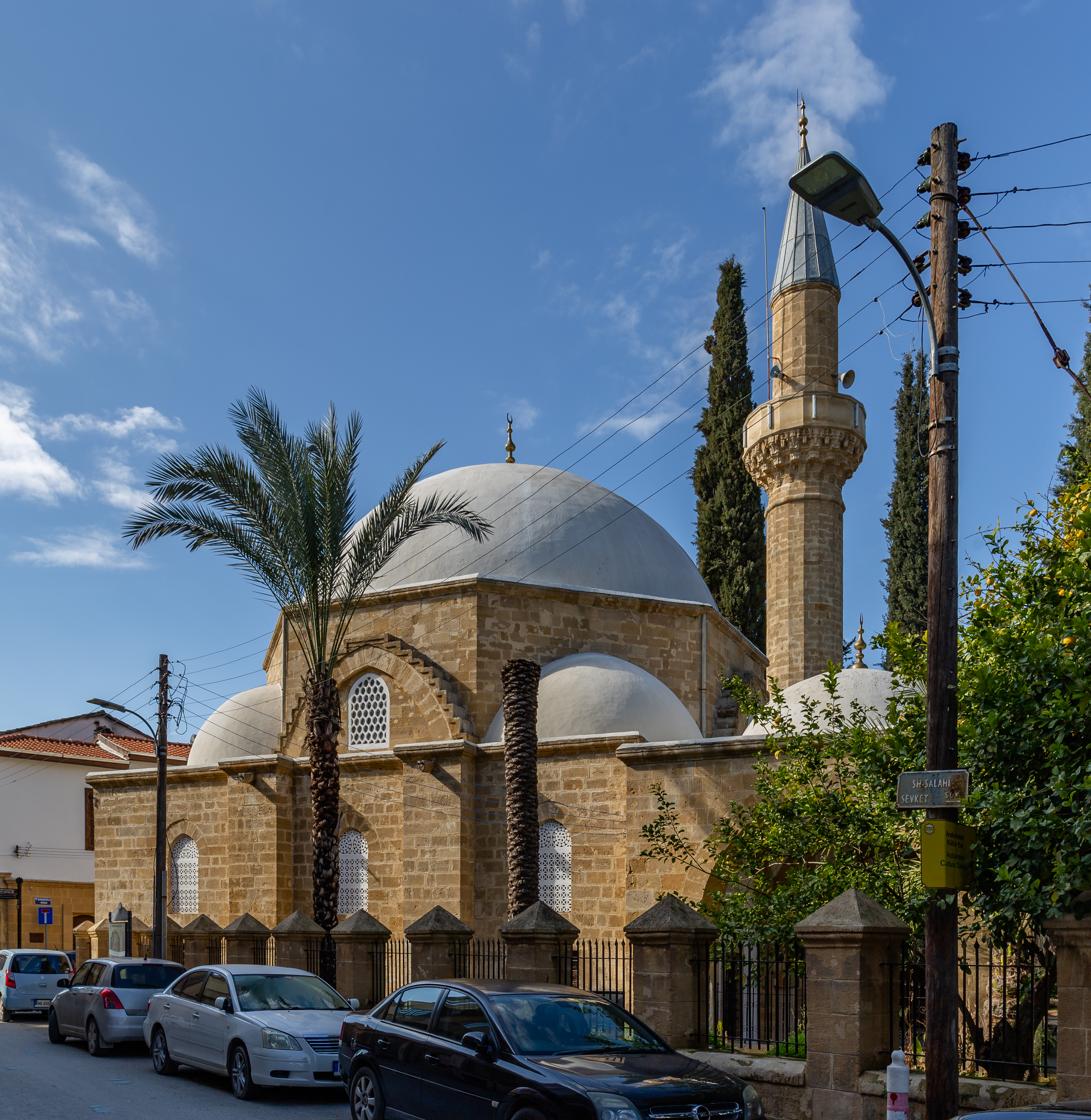
Arab Ahmet Mosque in North Nicosia

The majority of Turkish Cypriots (99%) are Sunni Muslims. Northern Cyprus is a secular state. Alcohol is frequently consumed within the community and most Turkish Cypriot women do not cover their heads; however headscarves are still worn on occasion by public figures as a symbol of the inhabitants' Turkish culture, or simply as a conservative form of dress. However, some religious traditions still play a role within the community. Turkish Cypriot males are generally circumcised in accordance with religious beliefs.

=== Education ===
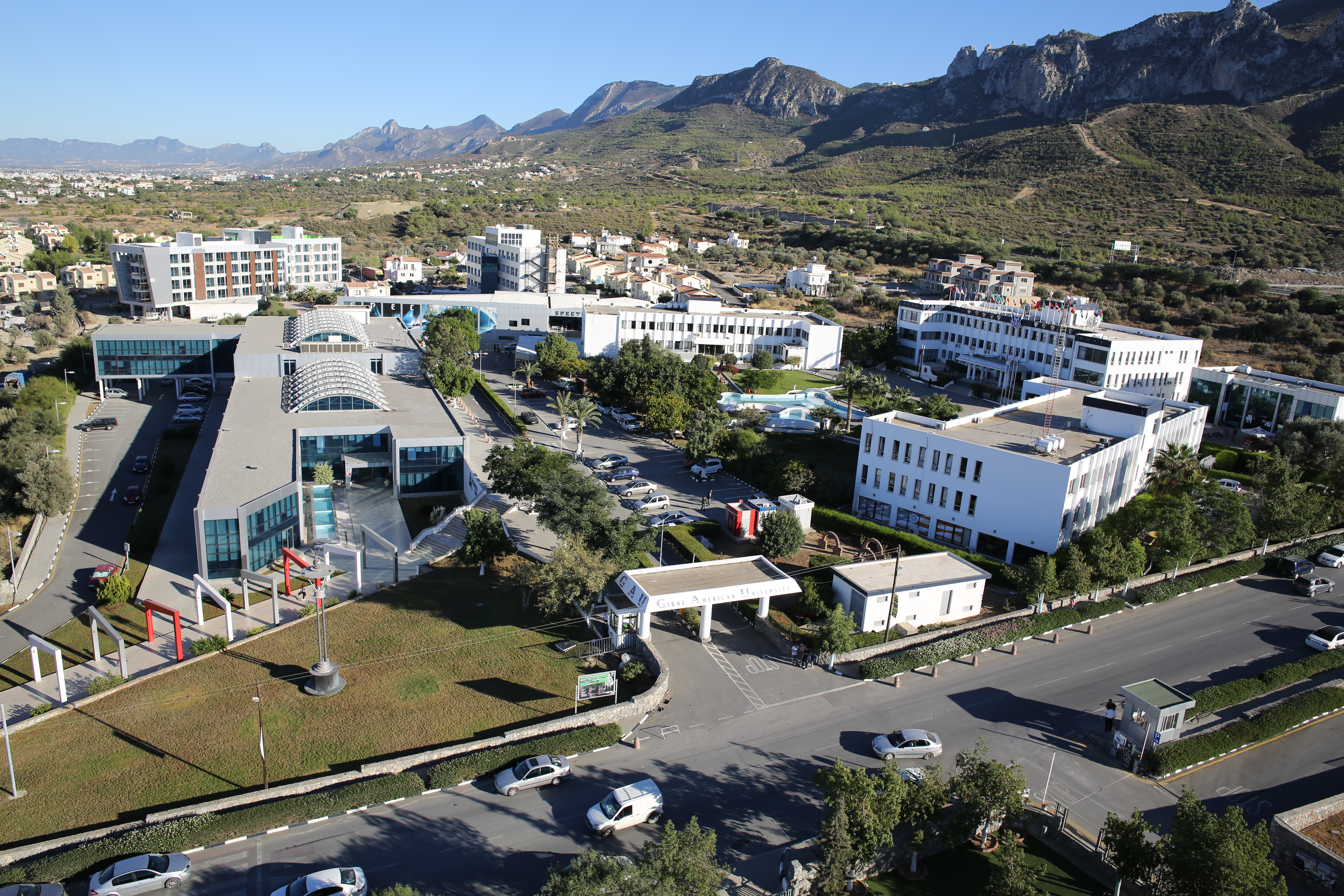
Girne American University in Kyrenia, Northern Cyprus

The education system in Northern Cyprus consists of pre-school education, primary education, secondary education and higher education. Five years of primary education is mandatory.

Higher Education Planning Evaluation Accreditation and Coordination Council (YÖDAK) of Northern Cyprus is a member of International Network for Quality Assurance Agencies in Higher Education (INQAAHE).

In 2013 there were 63,765 university students from 114 countries in nine universities in Northern Cyprus. In 2014, the number of students increased to 70,004, (15,210 Turkish Cypriots; 36,148 from Turkey; 18,646 international students): Near East University (NEU), Girne American University, Middle East Technical University-TRNC, European University of Lefke, Cyprus International University, Eastern Mediterranean University (EMU), Istanbul Technical University-TRNC, University of Mediterranean Karpasia, and University of Kyrenia, all established since 1974. EMU is an internationally recognised institution of higher learning with more than 1000 faculty members from 35 countries. There are 15,000 students in EMU representing 68 nationalities. The 8 universities have been approved by the Higher Education Council of Turkey. Eastern Mediterranean University and Near East University are full individual members of the European University Association. EMU is a full member of the Community of Mediterranean Universities, Federation Universities of Islamic World, International Association of Universities and International Council of Graphic Design Associations, and was ranked as the best university in the island and among the top 500 in Europe by Webometrics. Girne American University, in the northern coastal city of Kyrenia, opened a campus in Canterbury, United Kingdom in 2009, and was accredited by the British Accreditation Council in 2010.

Northern Cyprus regularly participates in international Robocup competition, and took 14th place out of 20 in 2013. The country has supercomputers with which it participates in CERN experiments that led to the discovery of the Higgs boson. Northern Cyprus is among participant countries of Solar Challenge of solar powered vehicles in South Africa in 2014.

== Culture ==
=== Music and dance ===
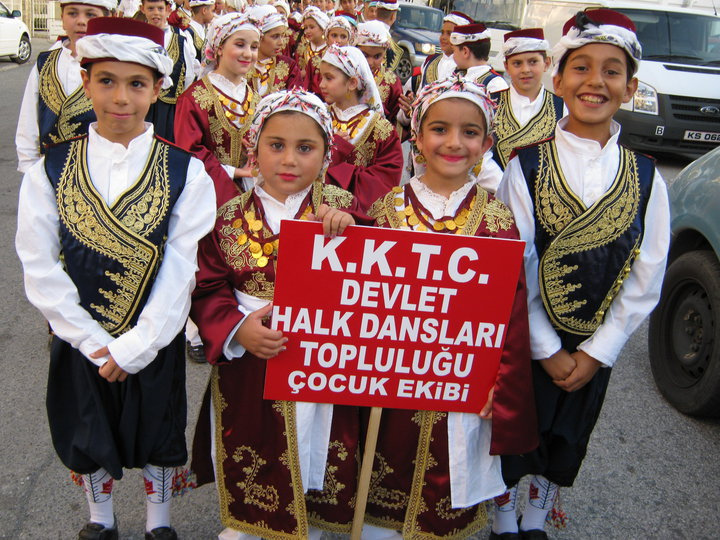
Turkish Cypriot children, dressed in traditional clothing, preparing for a folk-dance show

Turkish Cypriot folk music consists of a rich variety of local tunes, influenced by the mainland Turkish music to a limited extent. Historically, it was shaped around the tradition of weddings, the primary social gatherings at the time. Violin, goblet drum, known locally as "darbuka", zurna and other drums were heavily used in these gatherings, and a large number of traditional songs developed based on this legacy. Turkish Cypriot culture also incorporates a great diversity of folk dances with various influences, including different versions of karsilamas, çiftetelli and zeybek.

The Northern Cyprus State Symphony Orchestra has been active since 1975. The Bellapais Abbey in Kyrenia hosts international festivals of classical music, and is considered in important platform of classical music. North Nicosia has its own Nicosia Municipal Orchestra that performs at open spaces, such as parks and squares, and is also home to the annual Walled City Jazz Festival. Rüya Taner is a Turkish Cypriot pianist who has achieved international acclaim.

Turkish Cypriot cities and towns regularly organise festivals that include performances of local and international singers and bands. Some Turkish Cypriot singers, such as Ziynet Sali and Işın Karaca, have achieved fame in Turkey. The Turkish Cypriot band Sıla 4 produced music that is considered essential for the Turkish Cypriot identity, and also acquired fame in Turkey. Rock and pop music are popular with the public in Northern Cyprus, important singers and bands include SOS and Fikri Karayel.

=== Literature ===
Poetry is the most widely published form of literature in Northern Cyprus. Turkish Cypriot poetry is based on both the effects of Turkish literature and the culture of the island of Cyprus, along with some reflection of the British colonial history.

The first era of Turkish Cypriot poetry after the introduction of the Latin alphabet, characterised by poets such as Nazif Süleyman Ebeoğlu, Urkiye Mine Balman, Engin Gönül, Necla Salih Suphi and Pembe Marmara, had strong nationalistic elements due to the political attitudes of Turkish Cypriots at the time and stylistically reflected the poetry of the Turkish mainland. Meanwhile, other poets, such as Özker Yaşın, Osman Türkay, who was nominated for the Nobel Prize in Literature twice, and Nevzat Yalçın sought to write in more original styles, with the influence of nascent poetic styles in Turkey and those in Britain. This group of poets were very prolific and increased the popularity of poetry in the Turkish Cypriot community, and are seen as key figures in Turkish Cypriot literature.

The nationalism gave way to a notion of Cypriotness in the 1970s, with the influence of Yaşın, Türkay and Yalçın. During this period, the so-called "1974 generation of poets" arose, led by poets including Mehmet Yaşın, Hakkı Yücel, Nice Denizoğlu, Neşe Yaşın, Ayşen Dağlı and Canan Sümer. The poetry of this generation was characterised by the appreciation of the Turkish Cypriot identity as distinct from Turkish identity and the identification of Cyprus as the Turkish Cypriot homeland instead of Turkey, in contrast to the previous nationalist poetry. This approach is often called the "Cypriot poetry of rejection" as it resists the influence of Turkey, highlighting the cultural rift between Turkey and Cyprus due to the recent experience of war and therefore the independence of the Turkish Cypriot poetry and identity. This was followed by an increased adoption of the Mediterranean identity in the 1980s, accompanied by the effects of the liberalisation of the Turkish Cypriot society, as reflected in the feminist elements, of which a particular example is Neriman Cahit.

=== Theatre ===
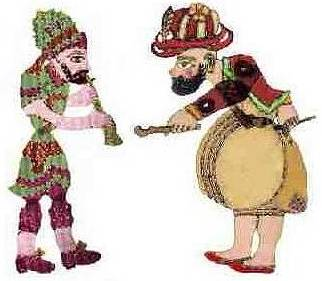
Karagöz and Hacivat

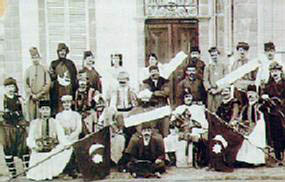
An early Turkish Cypriot theatre group, 1880s

Theatre in Northern Cyprus is mostly carried out by the Turkish Cypriot State Theatre, municipal theatres and a number of private theatrical companies. Cyprus Theatre Festival, organised by the Nicosia Turkish Municipality is a large organisation with institutions from Turkey participating as well. There are no major halls built specifically for theatre in Northern Cyprus, so plays often take place in conference halls.

The origins of Turkish Cypriot theatre lie in Karagöz and Hacivat, a shadow play that was popularised in the island as a form of entertainment during the Ottoman era. This form of theatre has lost its popularity nowadays, but remains to be televised during religious festivals. After the 1840s, as the Ottoman Empire started modernising, theatre with greater European elements met with the Turkish Cypriot public. However, the inception of Turkish Cypriot theatre in the modern sense is considered the staging of the play "Vatan Yahut Silistre" ("Homeland vs. Silistra") by Turkish playwright Namık Kemal in 1908. This was followed by a proliferation of theatrical activity in the Turkish Cypriot community as local plays were written and staged and theatrical companies from Turkey took the stage in Cyprus by the 1920s, all the major towns in Cyprus had Turkish Cypriot plays that were performed regularly.

In the 1960s, Turkish Cypriot theatre started to be institutionalised. A leading theatre group named "İlk Sahne" (First Stage), founded in 1963, was renamed the Turkish Cypriot State Theatre in 1966, and has since performed more than 85 plays. Theatre is currently a very popular form of art in Northern Cyprus, with long queues forming for tickets of the plays in the Cyprus Theatre Festival, and the number of theatre-goers constantly increasing.

=== Cinema ===
Anahtar (Key), released in 2011, was the first full-length film entirely produced in Northern Cyprus. Some other co-productions have also taken place. A co-production of Northern Cyprus, Turkey, Britain and the Netherlands, Kod Adı Venüs (Code Name Venus) was shown in the Cannes Film Festival in 2012. The film director and screenwriter Derviş Zaim achieved fame with his 2003 film Mud (Çamur) which won the UNESCO award at the Venice Film Festival.

The documentary film Kayıp Otobüs (The Missing Bus), directed by Turkish Cypriot journalist Fevzi Tașpınar, was aired on the TRT TV as well as participating in the Boston Film Festival in 2011. The film tells the story of eleven Turkish Cypriot workers who left their homes in a bus in 1964 that never came back. Their remains were found in a well in Cyprus in October 2006.

=== Cuisine ===
Northern Cyprus is also well known for several dishes; among them are kebabs made of skewered lamb (şiş kebab) or ground with herbs and spices and made into a kofte or şeftali kebab. Other dishes are based on meat wrapped in flat bread such as lahmacun. Vegetarian cuisine includes stuffed vegetable based dishes "yalancı dolma" or many other dishes made with a bean or pulse such as börülce which consists of Swiss chard cooked with black-eyed peas. There are also plant based foods such as molohiya or root based stews such as kolokas.

=== Sports ===
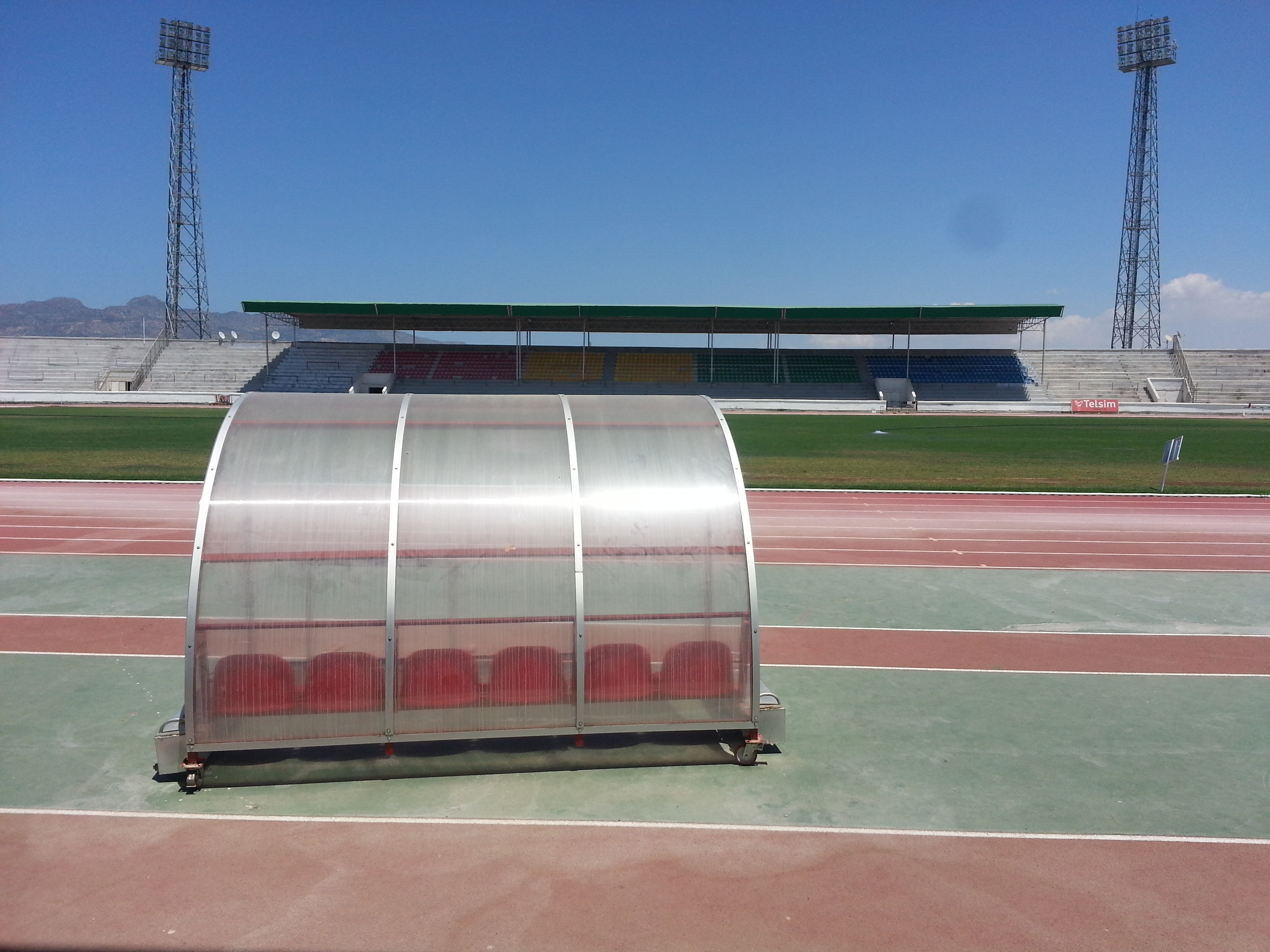
Nicosia Atatürk Stadium is the largest stadium in Northern Cyprus.

There are five stadiums in Northern Cyprus, with each holding a capacity ranging anywhere from 7,000 to 30,000. The most popular sport in Northern Cyprus is football. There are over 29 sport federations in Northern Cyprus with a total registered membership of 13,950. 6,054 been registered practitioners for taekwondo-karate-aikido-kurash, with shooting having 1,150 (registered) and hunting having 1,017 (registered) members. Several of sport clubs participate in leagues in Turkey. These include the Fast Break Sport Club in Turkey's Men's Basketball Regional League; the Beşparmak Sport Club in Turkey's Handball Premier League; and the Lefke European University Turkey Table-tennis Super League. Water sports such as windsurfing, jetskiing, waterskiing and sailing are also available at beaches throughout the coastline of Northern Cyprus. Sailing is especially found at Escape Beach Club, near Kyrenia.

Northern Cyprus is a member of the World Pool-Billiard Association.

== See also ==
- Outline of Northern Cyprus
- List of Turkish Cypriots
