= Morphou Bay =

Coordinates: 35°11′N 32°50′E

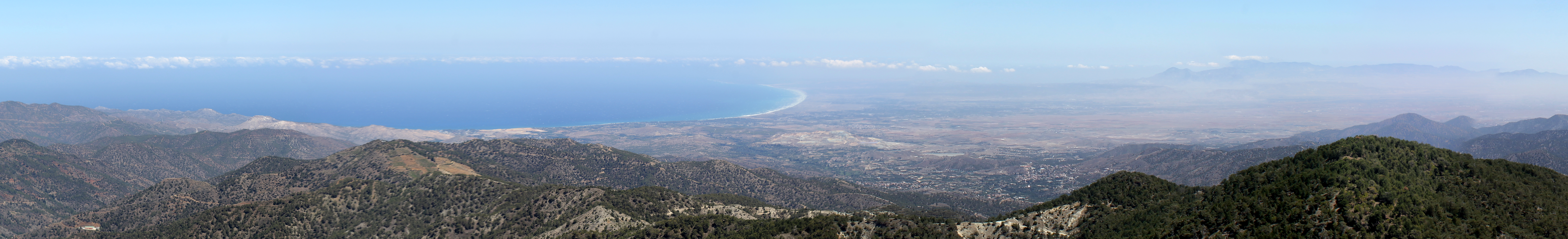
Panoramic view of Morphou Bay (Güzelyurt Bay)

Morphou Bay (Greek: Κόλπος Μόρφου, Kolpos Morfou; Turkish: Güzelyurt Körfezi), is a part of the Mediterranean Sea, located on the north-western side of the island of Cyprus. It is named after the nearby inland town of Morphou (Greek: Μόρφου; Turkish: Güzelyurt).

The Morphou Bay region is home to a couple of historical sites, the ancient Greek city of Soli and the ruins known as Vouni Palace.

The bay forms the westernmost seaboard of the break-away Turkish Republic of Northern Cyprus, which claims the bay as its own territorial waters. The Turkish Republic of Northern Cyprus has received diplomatic recognition only from Turkey, on which it is dependent economically, politically and militarily. The rest of the international community, including the United Nations and European Union, recognises the sovereignty of the Republic of Cyprus over the entire island, including Morphou Bay. It was here that Turkey began landing supplies and volunteers to assist the Turkish Cypriots when the intercommunal violence between the Greek and Turkish Cypriot communities started in December 1963.

== See also ==
- Kokkina
