= Famagusta Namık Kemal High School =

Coordinates: 35°7′4″N 33°56′28″E

- Gazimağusa Namık Kemal Lisesi
- Famagusta; Northern Cyprus

Information
- Type: Public secondary school
- Established: 1944
- Colours: Green and Yellow

Famagusta Namık Kemal High School is a secondary school located in Famagusta, Northern Cyprus. It was founded in 1944. Many famous Cypriots have graduated from Famagusta Namık Kemal High School.

== History ==
As the first Turkish Cypriot secondary education institution in Famagusta, the school was initially founded as the Famagusta Middle School (Turkish: Mağusa Ortaokulu) in 1944. It was initially a single room appended to the Gazi Primary School building. On opening, the school had 60 students. Once it reached 72 students in 1945, it moved to its own separate building; in 1949, it moved to the Kutup Osman Tekke building. The British colonial government of the time provided the monetary resources required to expand middle schools with a further three year groups, thus establishing high schools in the process. With the instigation of Niyazi Manyera, the Famagusta Middle School was expanded in 1953 and renamed after Namık Kemal, the Turkish nationalist poet who had been imprisoned in Famagusta. By 1959, the school had 2,000 students.

In December 1961, the students of the school undertook strike action and refused to attend school in protest of the Turkish Cypriot Communal Assembly and its educational policies. After the incident made national news, the parents wrote a letter to Rauf Denktaş, the head of the Assembly, apologising, and stating they would ensure their children returned to school.

Owing to its historical status, the high school has one of the largest libraries in Famagusta, but keeps this library closed to the public.

== Notable alumni ==
- Derviş Eroğlu, third president of Northern Cyprus
- Derviş Zaim, award-winning film director
- Oktay Kayalp, former mayor of Famagusta
- Oz Karahan, current president of the Union of Cypriots
- Beran Bertuğ, former governor of Famagusta
- Turgay Avcı, former deputy prime minister of Northern Cyprus
- İsmet Kotak, former Cabinet minister of Northern Cyprus
