= Jasmine Movement =

Jasmine Movement Κίνημα Γιασεμί Yasemin Hareketi
- Founded: 2019
- Headquarters: Nicosia, Cyprus
- Newspaper: Avrupa
- Ideology: Socialism; Left-wing nationalism Anti-imperialism; Cypriotism; Unitarism
- Political position: Left-wing
- European affiliation: None
- House of Representatives: 0 / 56
- European Parliament: 0 / 6
- Municipal Councils: 0 / 478

Website
- jasmine.cypriots.org

The Jasmine Movement (Greek: Κίνημα Γιασεμί; Turkish: Yasemin Hareketi) is a political movement in Cyprus.

Jasmine Movement was established by Afrika newspaper's chief editor Şener Levent. It mainly consists of Turkish Cypriots struggling against Turkey and Turkish occupation of the north of the Island. The movement supports a unitary solution concerning the reunification of Cyprus, but does not oppose a federal solution if the proposed plan will be a transitional stage to the unitary Cypriot state and not a springboard for separate states.

In 2019, the Jasmine Movement participated in the European Parliament elections held in the areas controlled by the Republic of Cyprus. The movement received 1.70% of the countrywide vote, and 23.57% of the Turkish Cypriot vote. Also, it was the first in the political history of Cyprus to be participating in the European Parliament elections with a full list of only Turkish Cypriot candidates and received 72.11% of its votes from Greek Cypriot voters. Union of Cypriots supported the Jasmine Movement in the elections, as the organisation's president Oz Karahan was one of the six candidates in the movement's list.

== 2019 European Parliament election candidates for the party ==
Şener Levent - Journalist, peace activist and the chief editor for Afrika newspaper

Ibrahim Aziz - Journalist, researcher, political analyst and peace activist

Oz Karahan - Political activist, peace activist and the current chairman of Union of Cypriots

Leyla Hüseyin Kıralp - Journalist, author and peace activist

Zeki Beştepeli - Economist and peace activist

Faize Özdemirciler - Journalist, author and peace activist

== See also ==
- Union of Cypriots
- Afrika (newspaper)
- Oz Karahan
