= Beran =

Beran may refer to:

- Beran, type of grape better known as Malbec
- Beran, Iran, village in West Azerbaijan Province
- Beran (surname), Czech surname
- Beran Bertuğ, Turkish politician
- Beran Selo, selo in Montenegro
