= Oz Karahan =

Cypriot political activist (born 1990)

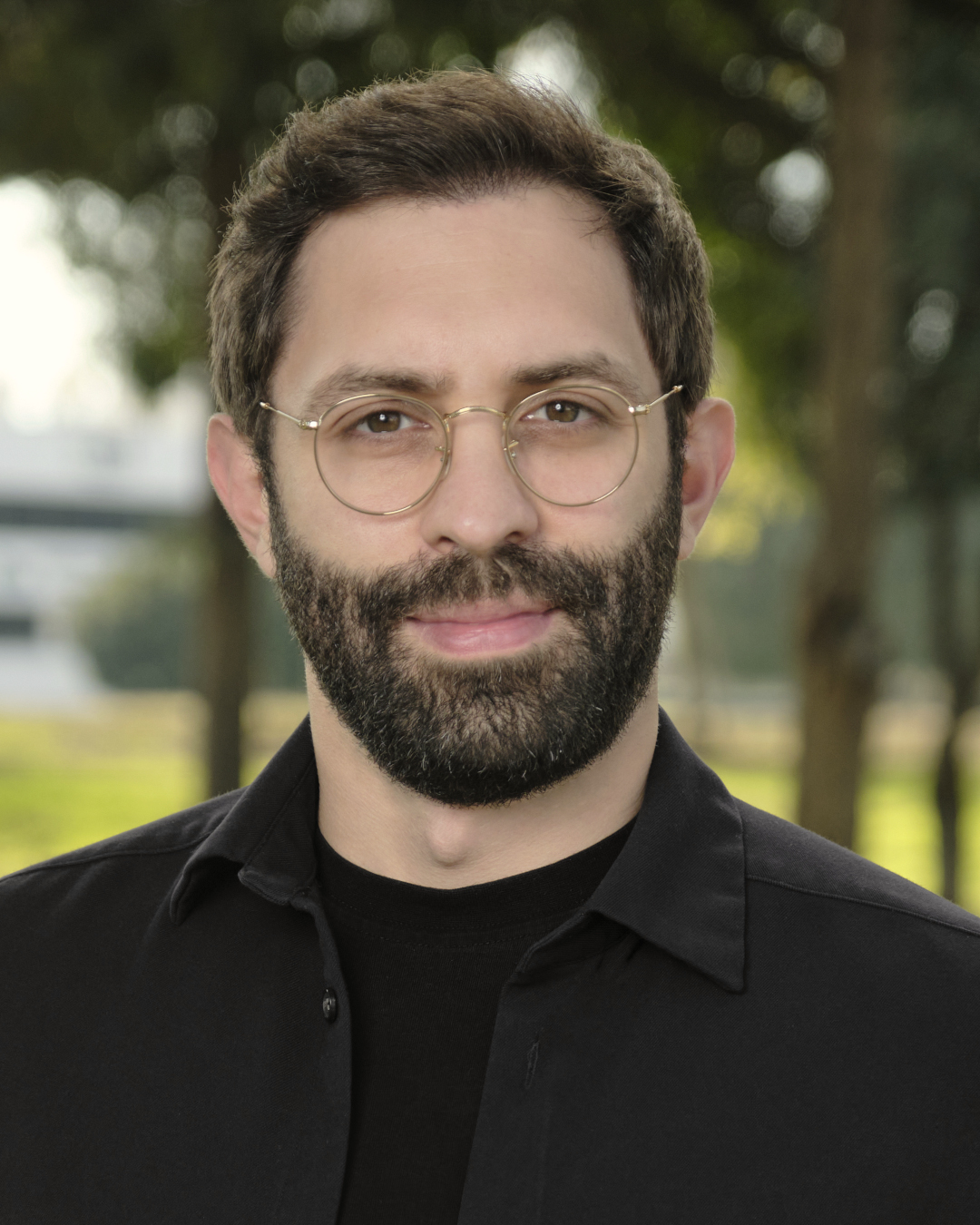
- Karahan in 2024
- Born: 1990 (age 35–36); Istanbul, Turkey
- Education: Anglo-American University
- Organization: Union of Cypriots
- Other political affiliations: Green Party of Cyprus

Oz Karahan is a Cypriot political activist, columnist and current president of the Union of Cypriots.

== Life and political career ==
Born in Istanbul, in 1990 to a Turkish Cypriot mother and a father of Meskhetian descent, Oz Karahan moved to Famagusta when he was 15 years old. After his studies, he eventually moved to Larnaca, where the Cypriot part of his family originates from. During his childhood in Istanbul, he took part in the activities of the Turanist movements.

He graduated from Famagusta Namık Kemal High School. From a very young age, he joined and led a youth organization called Linobambaki, which was an active organisation during the 2011 Turkish Cypriot protests against Turkey. After completing his university studies in Anglo-American University, he became politically active in the United States, Sweden and Germany. During this time, was a member of the Communist Party USA in United States, as well as a member of the Communist Party in Sweden.

He was one of the founders of the World Union of Turkish-speaking Cypriots (WUTC), which fought against the Turkish occupation and the social and cultural oppression that Turkish Cypriots face in the occupied areas of Cyprus because of Turkey.

Oz Karahan participated in the European Parliament elections as an MEP candidate from the Jasmine Movement independents list in 2019, and from the Green Party of Cyprus list in 2024. In 2026, he ran for the House of Representatives on the Green Party of Cyprus list, becoming the second Turkish Cypriot after the poet Neşe Yaşın to run for parliament since the 1963–64 crisis.

He writes in his column “Gavur Imam” for the Avrupa newspaper.

At the seventh international assembly of the International League of Peoples' Struggle, he was elected as a member of the International Coordination Committee and as the vice chair for Europe of the organization.
