= Famagusta =

City and municipality in Northern Cyprus

Famagusta: Αμμόχωστος (Greek); Gazimağusa (Turkish)
- City and municipality
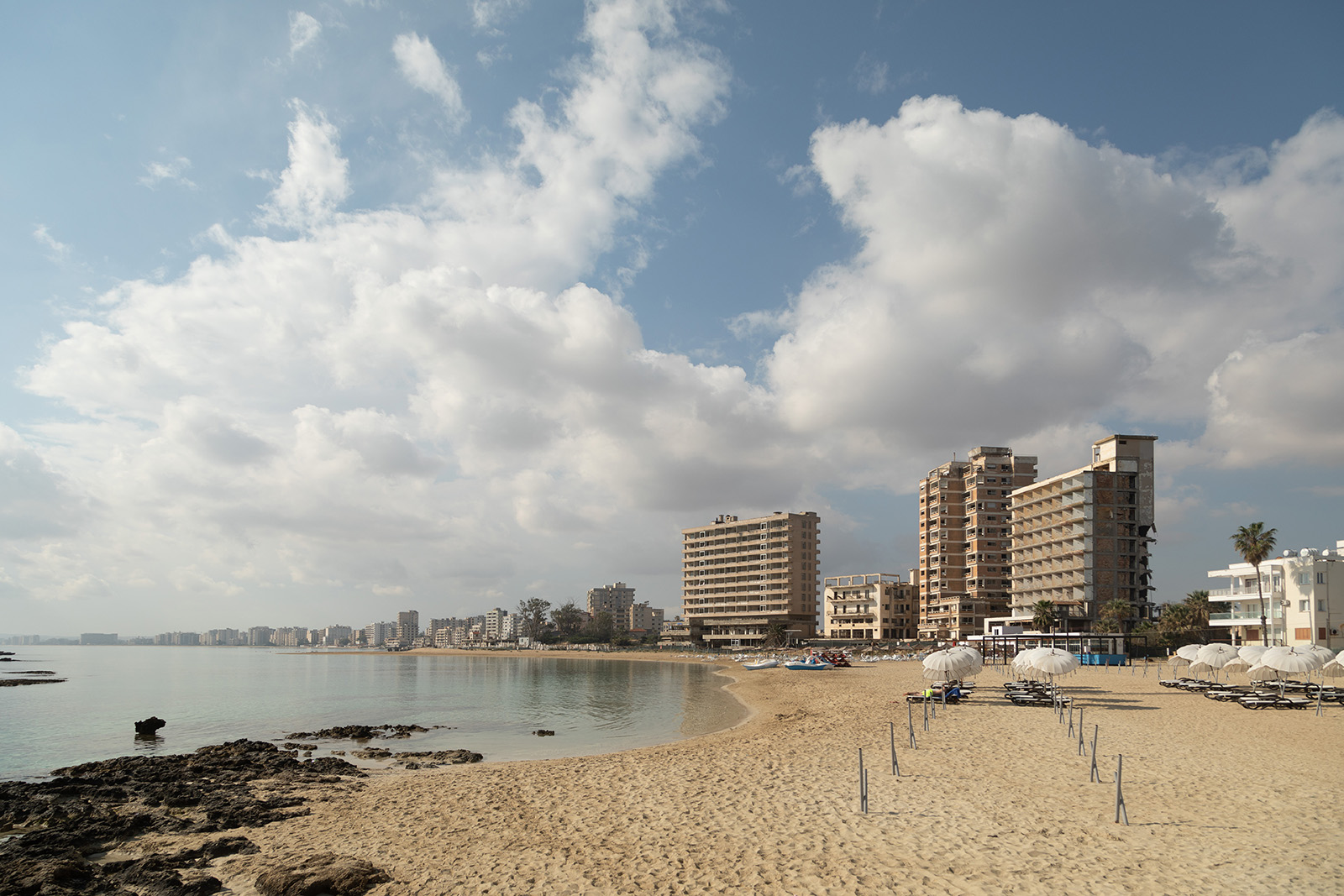
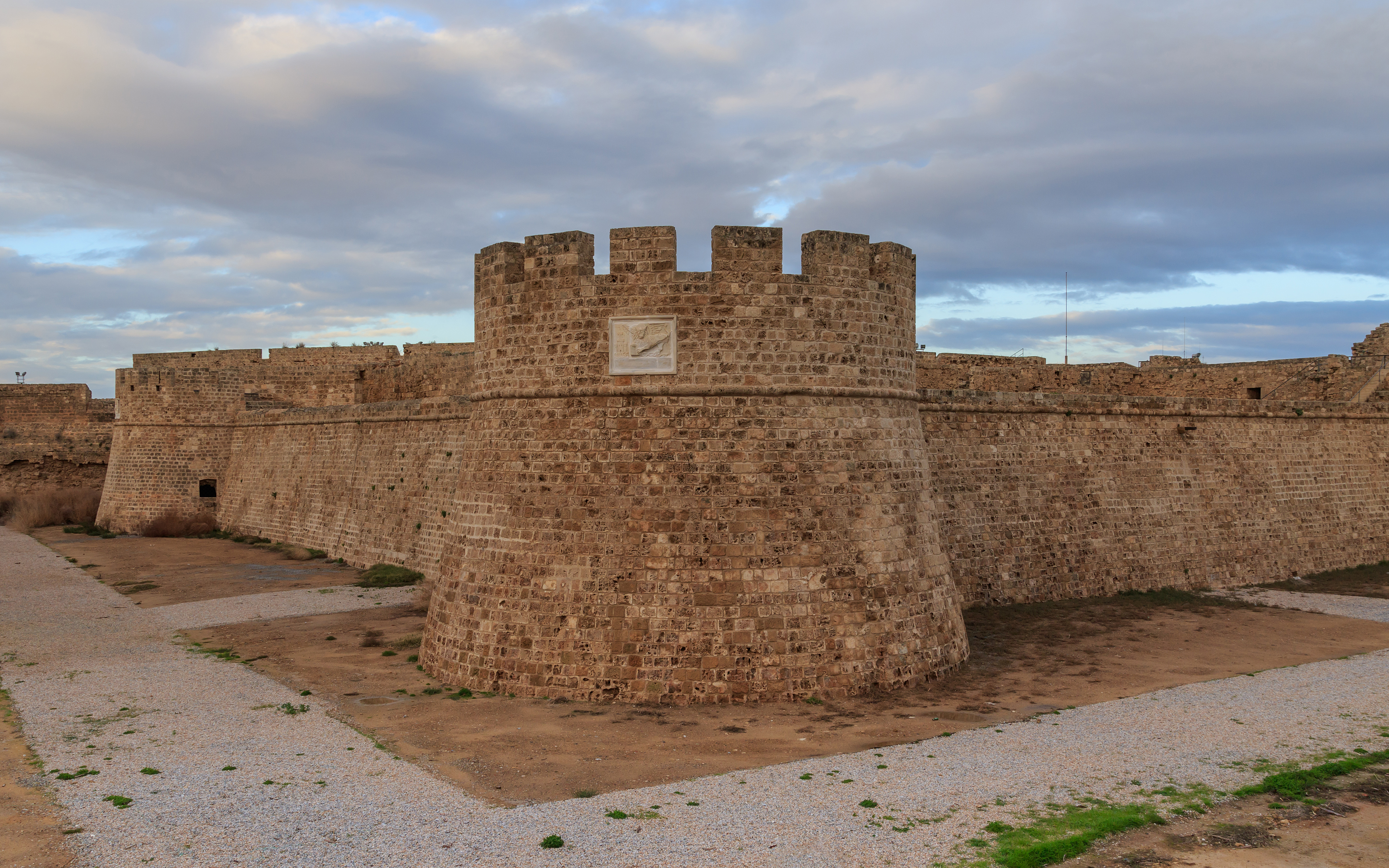
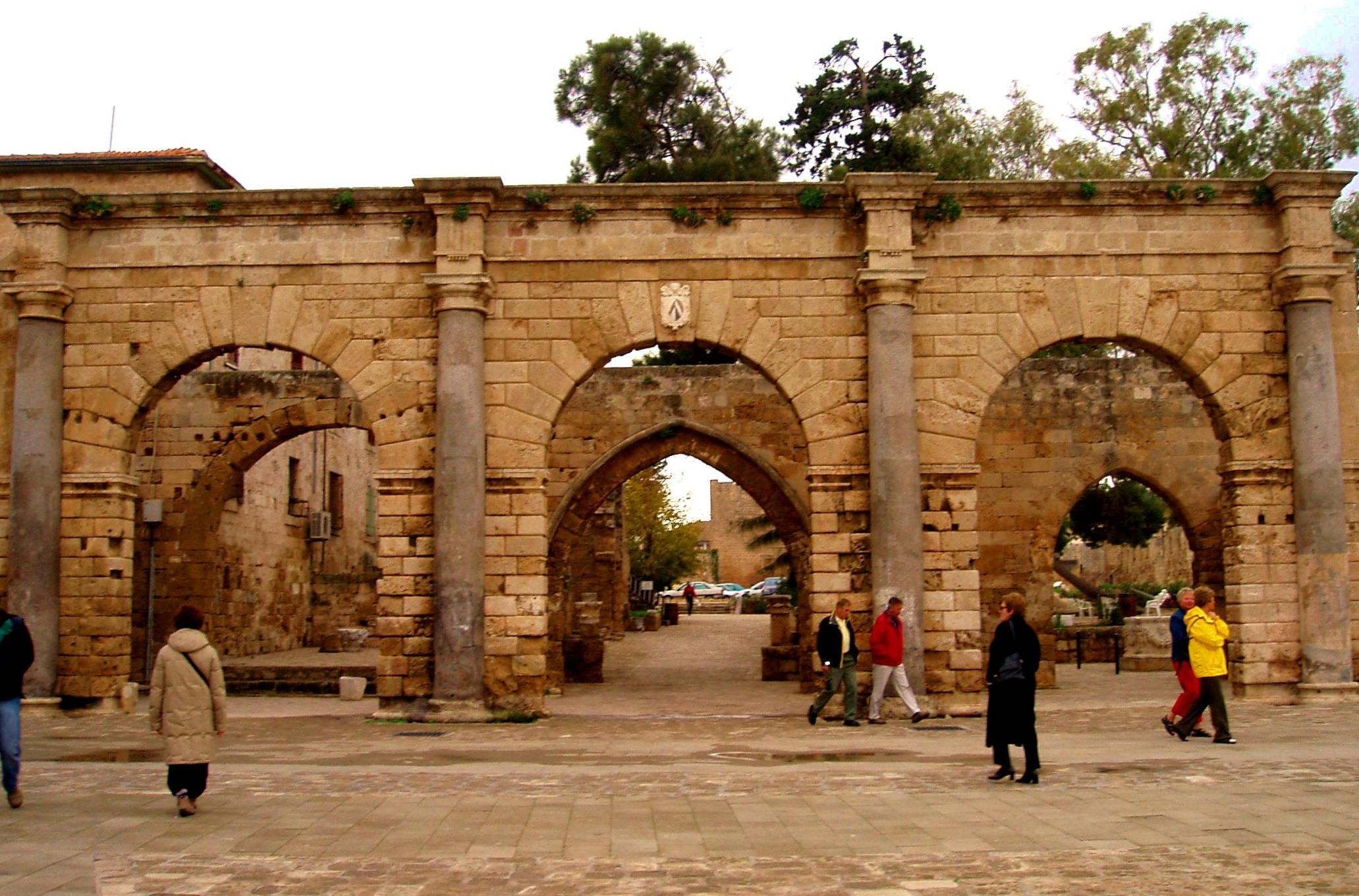
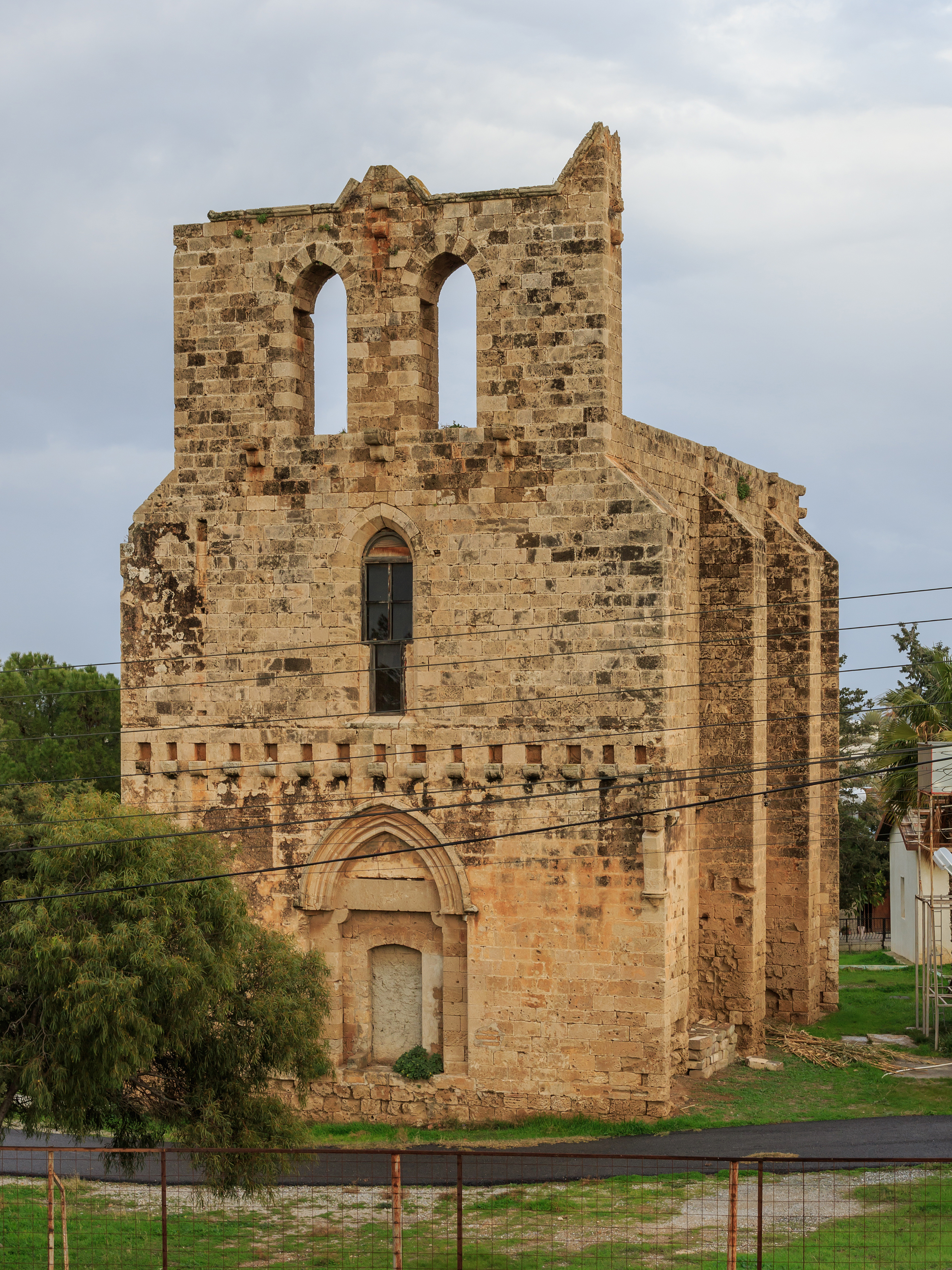
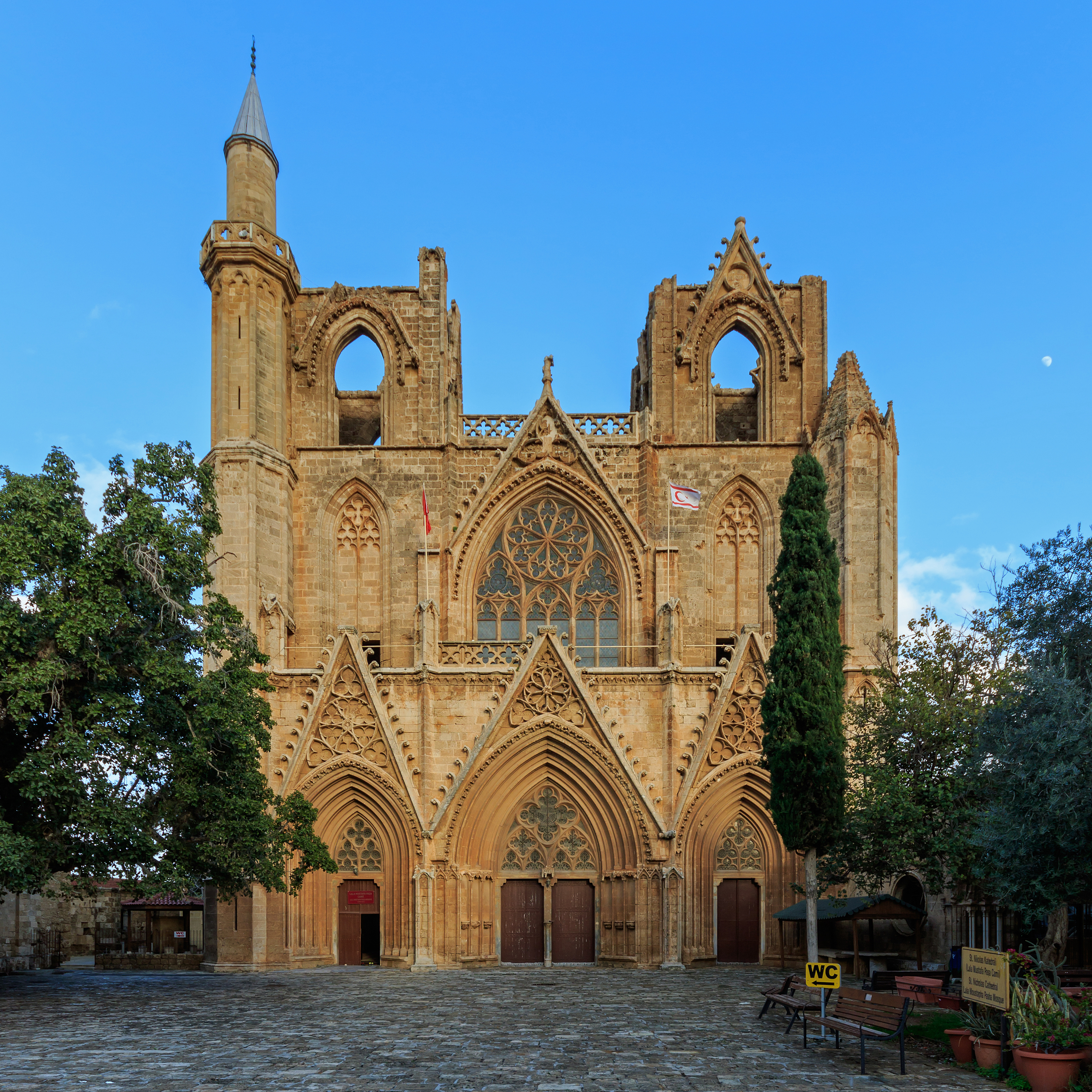
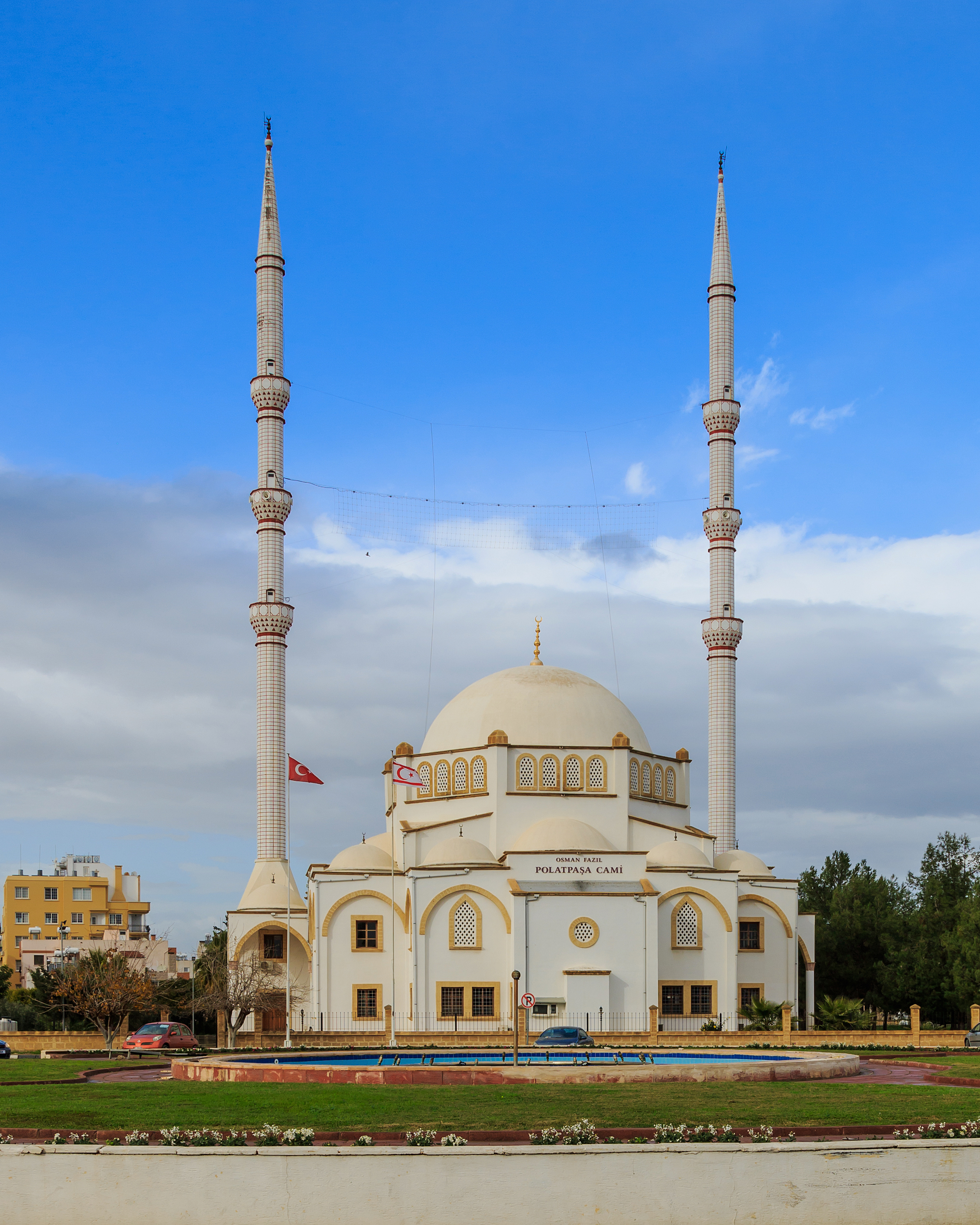
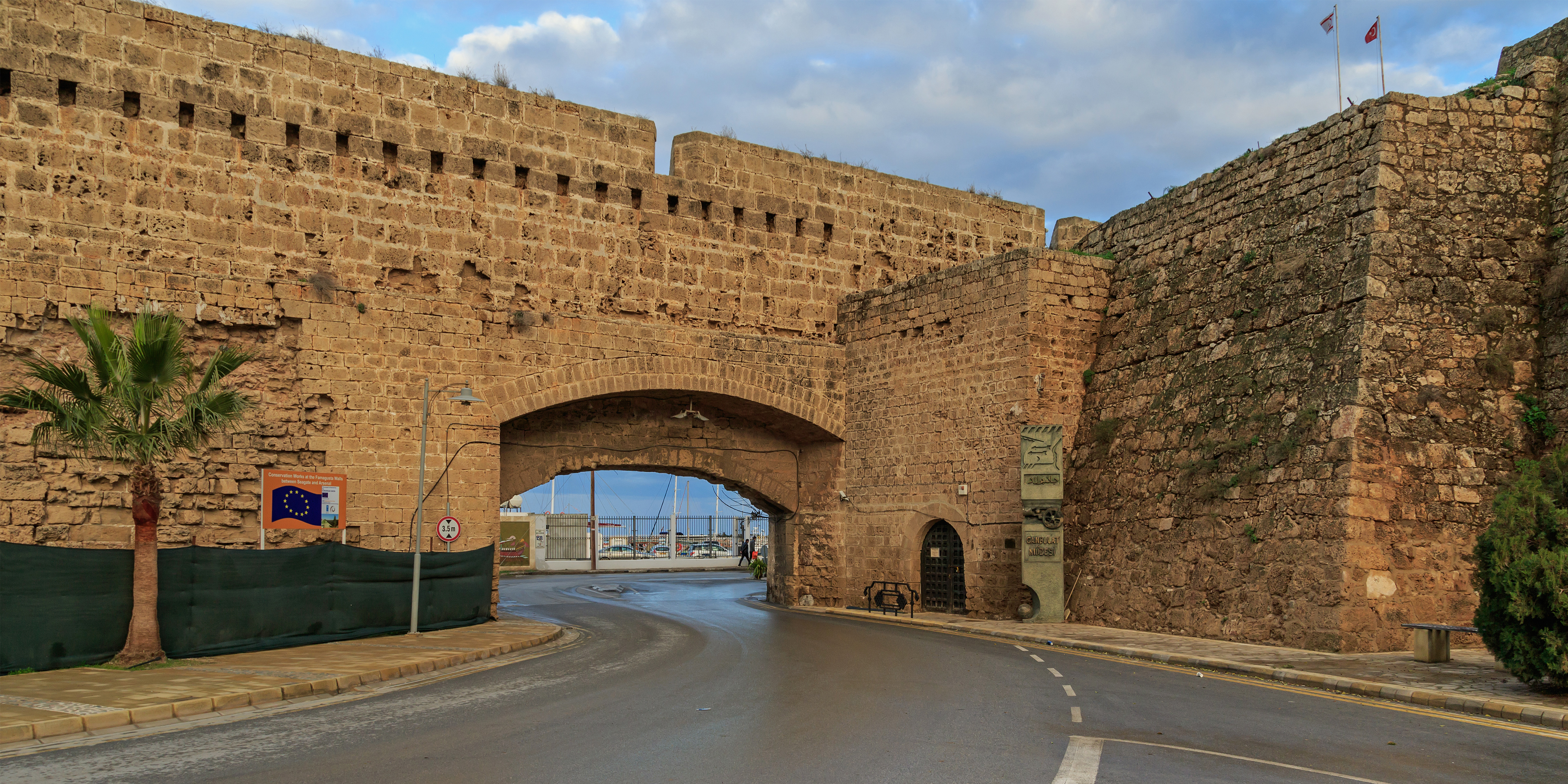
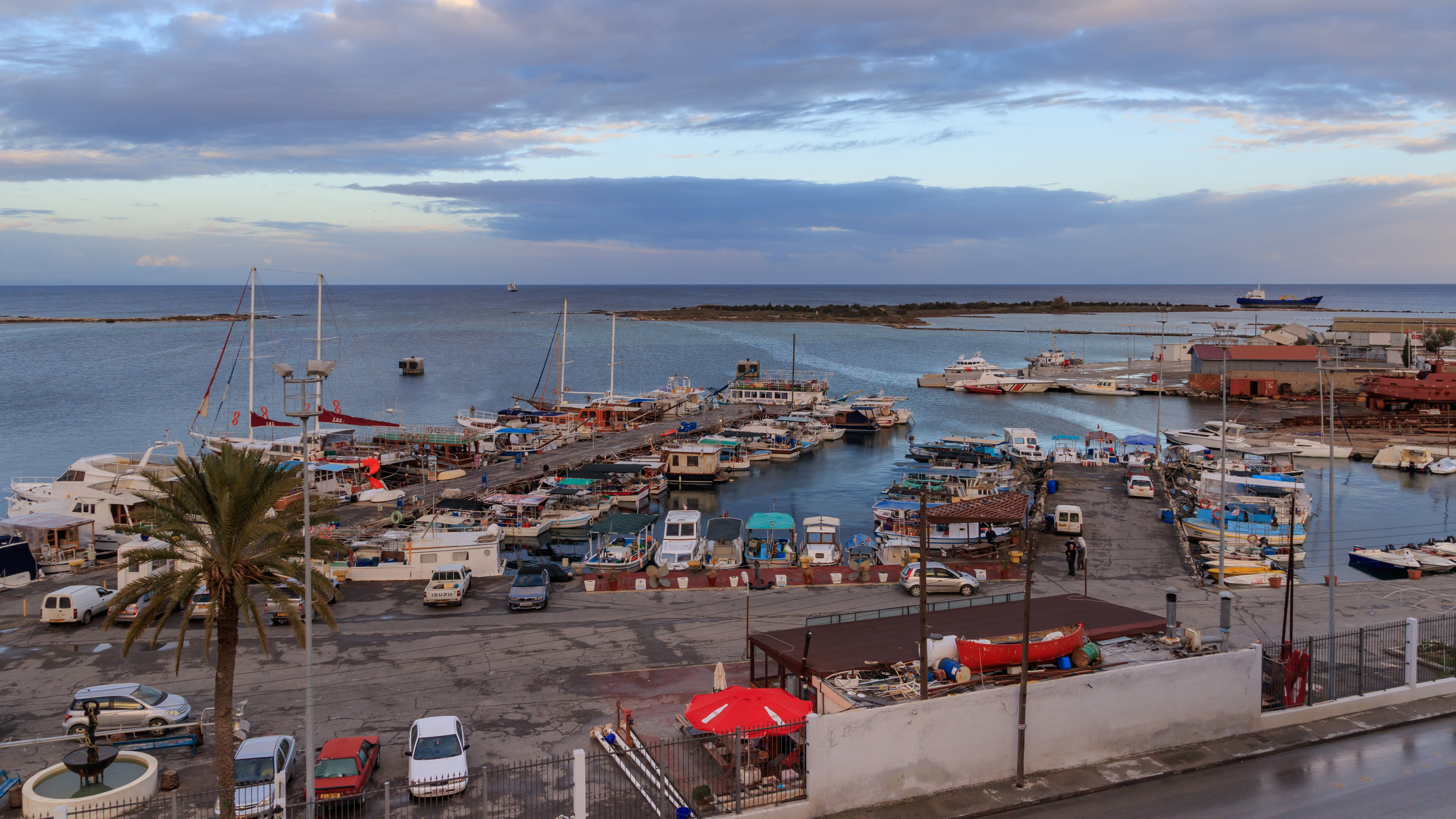
- Varosha Othello Castle Lusignan Palace St Anne Church Lala Mustafa Pasha Mosque Osman Fazil Mosque Famagusta Walls Famagusta Port
- Interactive map of Famagusta
- Location within Cyprus Location within the Eastern Mediterranean Location within Asia
- Coordinates: 35°07′30″N 33°56′30″E
- Country (de jure): Cyprus
- District: Famagusta District
- Country (de facto): Northern Cyprus
- District: Gazimağusa District

Government
  - Mayor: Simos Ioannou (Republic of Cyprus, in exile); Süleyman Uluçay (Turkish Republic of Northern Cyprus)

Area
  - Municipality: 37.7 km^{2} (14.6 sq mi)
  - District: 997 km^{2} (385 sq mi)

Population (2019)
  - Municipality: 55,648
  - Density: 1,480/km^{2} (3,820/sq mi)
  - District: 91,307
- Time zone: UTC+2 (EET)
  - Summer (DST): UTC+3 (EEST)
- Website: Famagusta Turkish Municipality (in Famagusta); Famagusta Municipality (in exile)

Famagusta (Greek: Αμμόχωστος; Turkish: Gazimağusa), (Note: UK: /ˌfæməˈɡʊstə, ˌfɑːm-/ FA(H)M-ə-GUUST-ə, US: /ˌfɑːməˈɡuːstə/ FAH-mə-GOO-stə) also known by several other names, is a city located in the Famagusta District on the eastern coast of the island of Cyprus. The district is mostly controlled by Northern Cyprus but some remains in the Republic of Cyprus. It is located east of the capital, Nicosia, and possesses the island's deepest harbour. During the Middle Ages (especially under the maritime republics of Genoa and Venice), Famagusta was the island's most important port city and a gateway to trade with the ports of the Levant, from where Silk Road merchants carried their goods to Western Europe.

== Names ==
The city was known as Arsinoe or Arsinoë (Ancient Greek: Ἀρσινόη, Arsinóē) in antiquity, after Ptolemy II of Egypt's sister and wife Arsinoe II.

By the 3rd century, the city appears as Ammochostos (Ancient Greek: Ἀμμόχωστος or Αμμόχωστος, Ammókhōstos, "Hidden in Sand") in the Stadiasmus Maris Magni. This name is still used in modern Greek with the pronunciation [aˈmoxostos], while it developed into Latin Fama Augusta, French Famagouste, Italian Famagosta, and English Famagusta during the medieval period. Its informal modern Turkish name Mağusa (Turkish pronunciation: [maˈusa]) came from the same source. On 25 December 1975, the formal name in Northern Cyprus was changed by an act of parliament to Gazimağusa ([ɡaːzimaˈusa]) with the addition of the title gazi, meaning "veteran", following the pattern of Antep receiving the title in 1921. (Note: The cities of Maraş and Urfa were similarly renamed in 1973 and 1984 respectively.)

In the early medieval period, the city was also known as New Justiniana (Ancient Greek: Νέα Ἰουστινιανία, Néa Ioustinianía) in appreciation for the patronage of the Byzantine emperor Justinian, whose wife Theodora was born there.

== History ==
The city was founded around 274 BC by Ptolemy II Philadelphus, after Salamis was seriously damaged by an earthquake, and named "Arsinoe" after his sister. Arsinoe was described as a "fishing town" by Strabo in his Geographica in the first century BC. In essence, Famagusta was the successor of the most famous and most important ancient city of Cyprus, Salamis. According to Greek mythology, Salamis was founded after the end of the Trojan War by Teucros, the son of Telamon and brother of Aedes, from the Greek island of Salamis.

=== Under Byzantine rule ===
The city experienced great prosperity, during the time of the Byzantine emperor Justinian. To honor the city, from which his wife Theodora came, Justinian enriched it with many buildings, while the inhabitants named it New Justiniania to express their gratitude. In AD 647, when the neighboring cities were destroyed by Arab raiding, the inhabitants of these cities moved to Famagusta, as a result of which the city's population increased significantly and the city experienced another boom.

=== Following the Arab conquest of Jerusalem ===
Later, when Jerusalem was occupied by the Arabs, the Christian population fled to Famagusta, as a result of which the city became an important Christian centre, and one of the most important commercial centres in the eastern Mediterranean.

=== Lusignan, Genoese and Venetian Famagusta ===
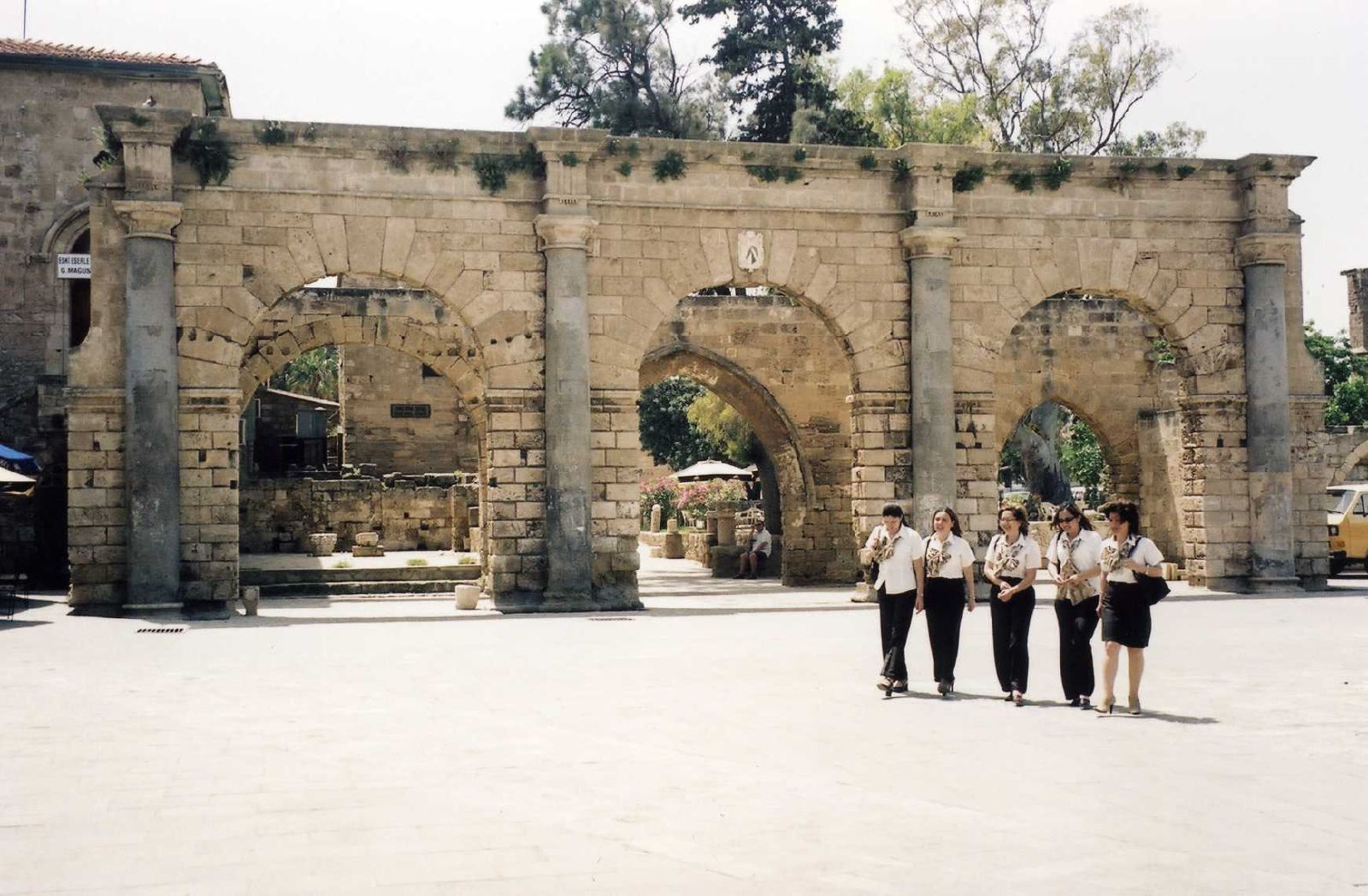
Palazzo del Provveditore (the Royal Palace) entrance, Famagusta.

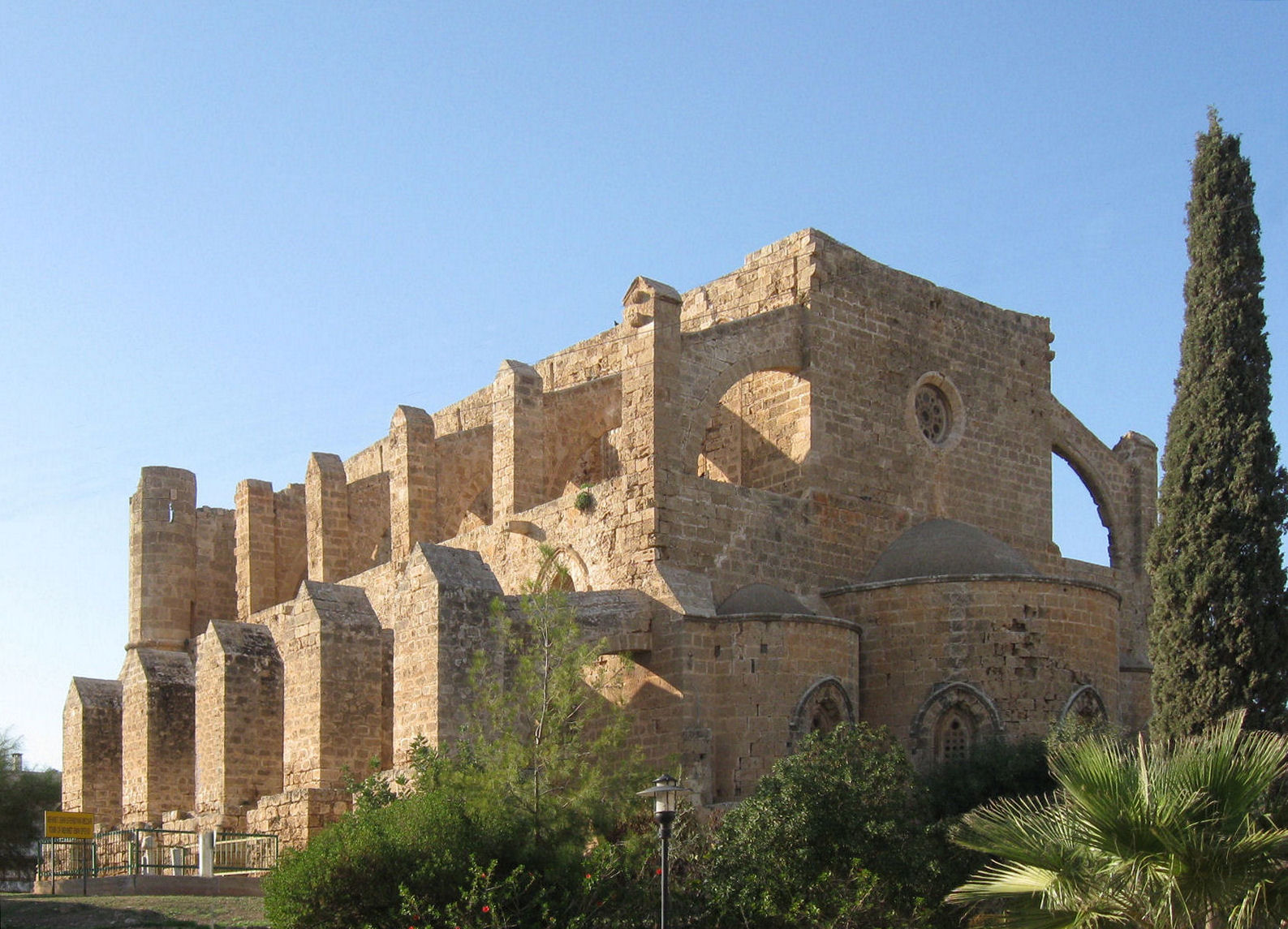
Church of Sts. Peter and Paul (1359) was converted into a mosque in 1571 and renamed as the Sinan Pasha Mosque.

The turning point for Famagusta was 1192 with the onset of Lusignan rule. It was during this period that Famagusta developed as a fully-fledged town. It increased in importance to the Eastern Mediterranean due to its natural harbour and the walls that protected its inner town. Its population began to increase. This development accelerated in the 13th century as the town became a centre of commerce for both the East and West. An influx of Christian refugees fleeing the downfall of Acre (1291) in Palestine transformed it from a tiny village into one of the richest cities in Christendom.

In 1372 the port was seized by Genoa and in 1489 by Venice. This commercial activity turned Famagusta into a place where merchants and ship owners lived in luxury. By the mid-14th century, Famagusta was said to have the richest citizens in the world. The belief that people's wealth could be measured by the churches they built inspired these merchants to have churches built in varying styles. These churches, which still exist, were the reason Famagusta came to be known as "the district of churches". The development of the town focused on the social lives of the wealthy people and was centred upon the Lusignan palace, the cathedral, the square and the harbour.

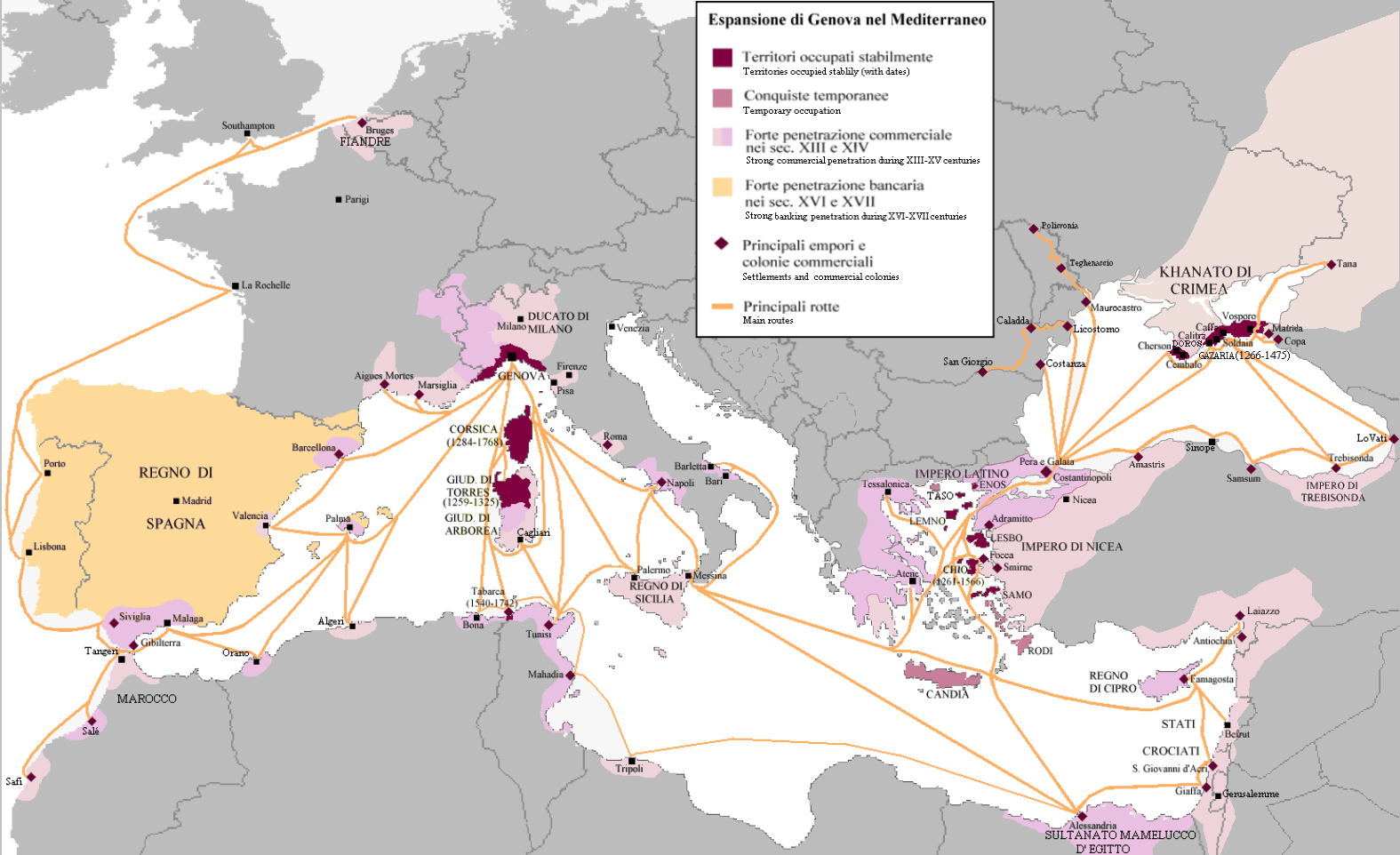
Territories, colonies and trade routes of the Republic of Genoa

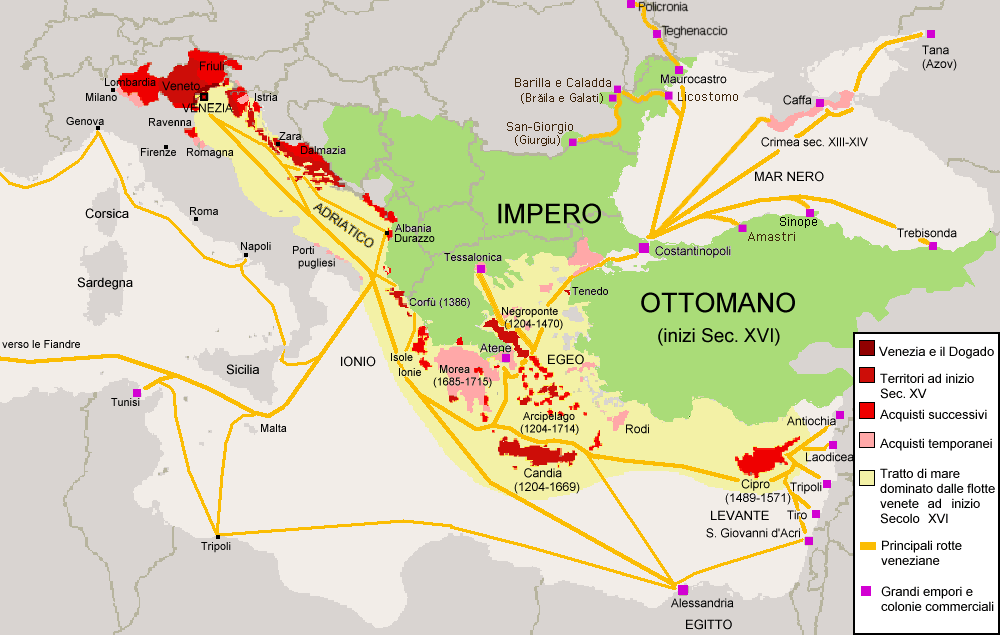
Territories, colonies and trade routes of the Republic of Venice

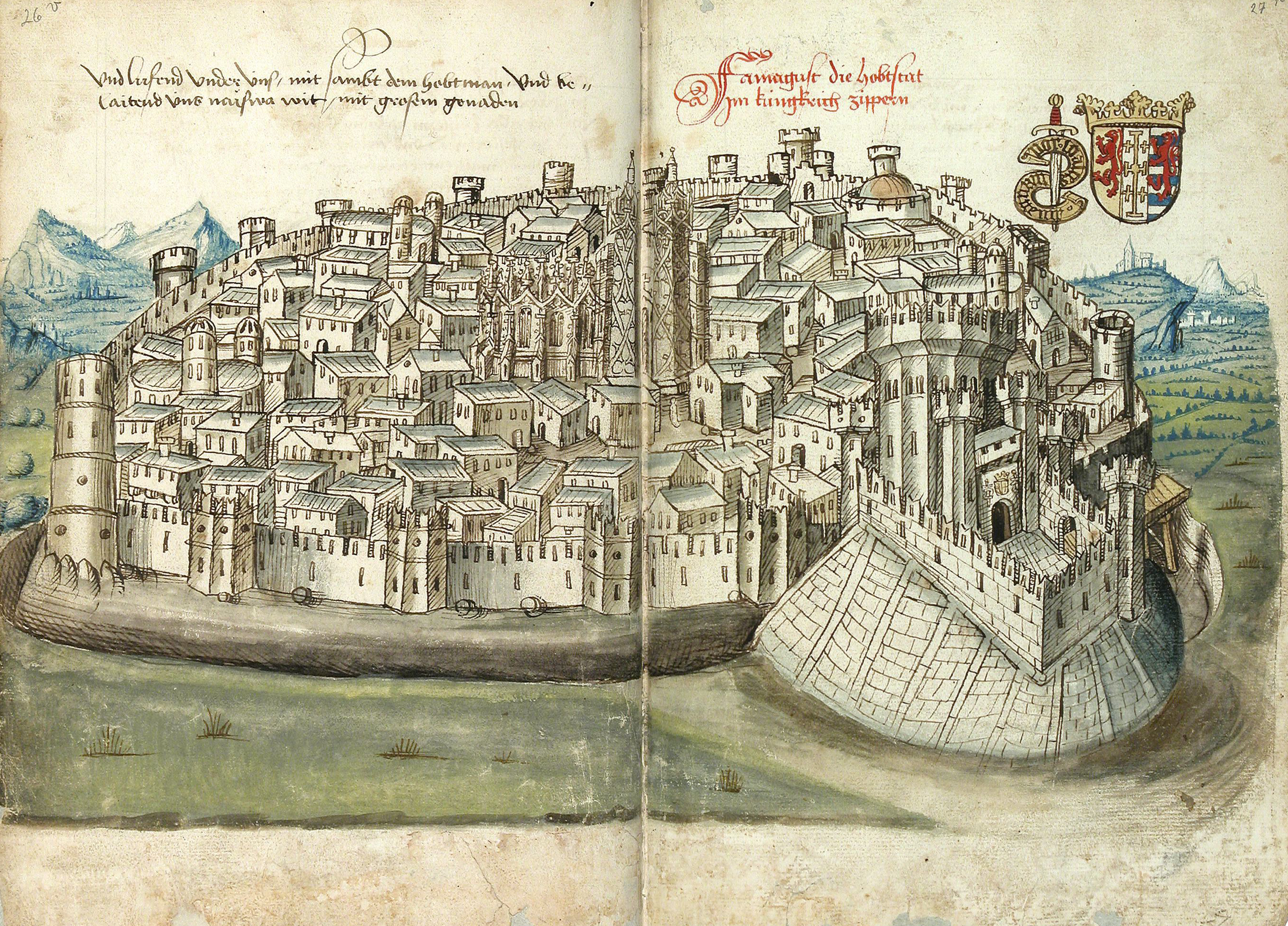
View of Famagusta in the 1480s, from Beschreibung der Reise von Konstanz nach Jerusalem

=== Ottoman Famagusta ===
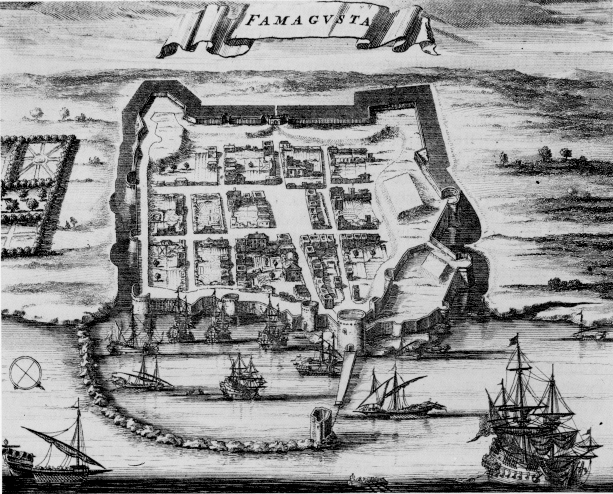
The port of Famagusta, engraving from the book of Olfert Dapper "Description exact des iles des l'Archipel", Amsterdam, 1703.

In 1570–1571, Famagusta was the last stronghold in Venetian Cyprus to hold out against the Turks under Mustafa Pasha. It resisted a siege of thirteen months and a terrible bombardment, until the garrison surrendered. The Ottoman forces had lost 50,000 men, including Mustafa Pasha's son. Although the surrender terms had stipulated that the Venetian forces be allowed to return home, the Venetian commander, Marco Antonio Bragadin, was flayed alive, his lieutenant Tiepolo was hanged, and many other Christians were killed.

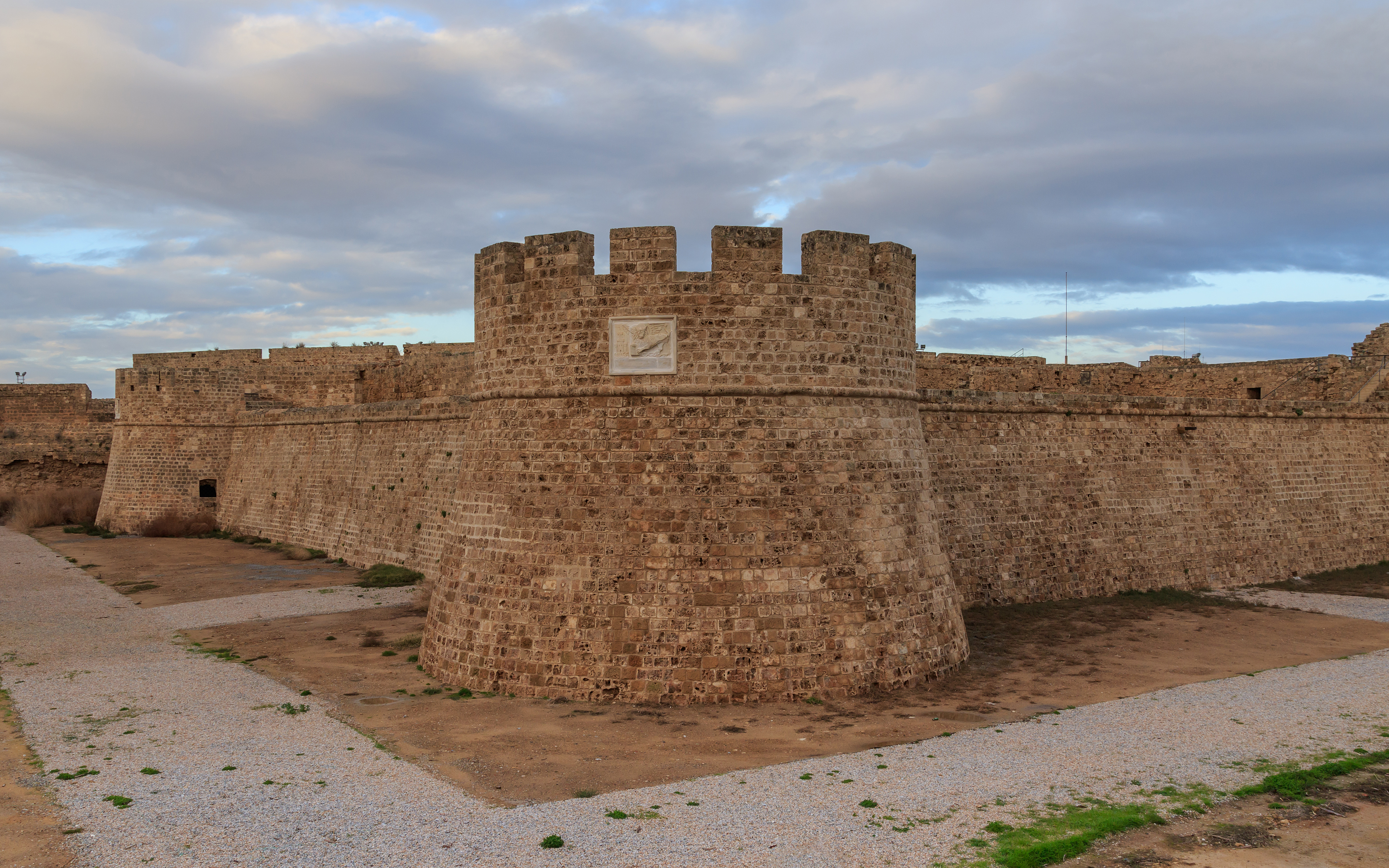
Famagusta citadel walls

With the advent of the Ottoman rule, Latins lost their privileged status in Famagusta and were expelled from the city. At first Greek Cypriot natives were allowed to own and buy property in the city, but were banished from the walled city in 1573–1574 and had to settle outside in the area that later developed into Varosha. Turkish families from Anatolia were resettled in the walled city but could not fill the buildings that previously hosted a population of 10,000. This caused a drastic decrease in population. Merchants from Famagusta, who mostly consisted of Latins that had been expelled, resettled in Larnaca and as Larnaca flourished, Famagusta lost its importance as a trade centre. Over time, Varosha developed into a prosperous agricultural town thanks to its location away from the marshes, while the walled city remained dilapidated.

In the walled city, some buildings were repurposed to serve the interests of the Muslim population: the Cathedral of St. Nicholas was converted to a mosque (now known as Lala Mustafa Pasha Mosque), a bazaar was developed, public baths, fountains and a theological school were built to accommodate the inhabitants' needs. Dead end streets, an Ottoman urban characteristic, were imported to the city and a communal spirit developed in which a small number of two-storey houses inhabited by the small upper class co-existed with the widespread one-storey houses.

=== British rule ===
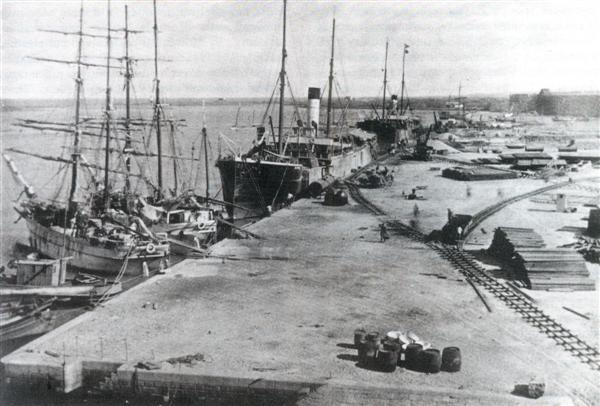
Harbor of the city of Famagusta, 1905

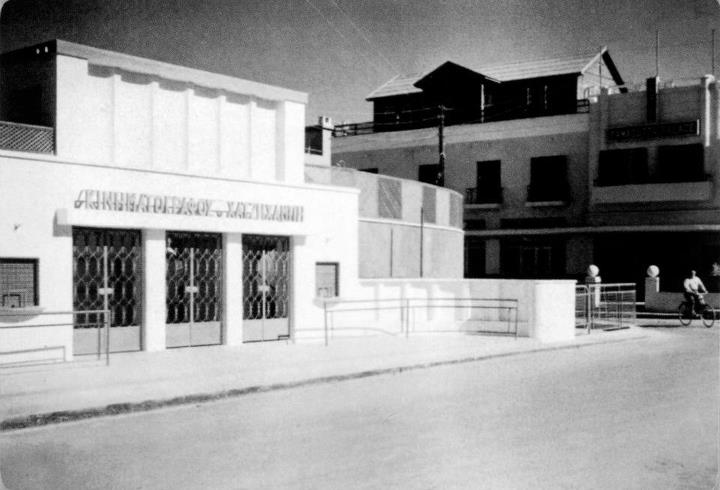
Cinema Hadjichambi where Nea Salamis Famagusta was established in 1948.

With the British takeover, Famagusta regained its significance as a port and an economic centre and its development was specifically targeted in British plans. As soon as the British took over the island, a Famagusta Development Act was passed that aimed at the reconstruction and redevelopment of the city's streets and dilapidated buildings as well as better hygiene. The port was developed and expanded between 1903 and 1906 and Cyprus Government Railway, with its terminus in Famagusta, started construction in 1904. Whilst Larnaca continued to be used as the main port of the island for some time, after Famagusta's use as a military base in World War I trade shifted significantly to Famagusta. The city outside the walls grew at an accelerated rate, with development being centred around Varosha. Varosha became the administrative centre as the British moved their headquarters and residences there and tourism grew significantly in the last years of the British rule. Pottery and production of citrus and potatoes also significantly grew in the city outside the walls, whilst agriculture within the walled city declined to non-existence.

New residential areas were built to accommodate the increasing population towards the end of the British rule, and by 1960, Famagusta was a modern port city extending far beyond Varosha and the walled city.

The British period saw a significant demographic shift in the city. In 1881, Christians constituted 60% of the city's population while Muslims were at 40%. By 1960, the Turkish Cypriot population had dropped to 17.5% of the overall population, while the Greek Cypriot population had risen to 70%. The city was also the site for one of the British internment camps for nearly 50,000 Jewish survivors of the Holocaust trying to emigrate to Palestine.

=== From independence to the Turkish invasion ===
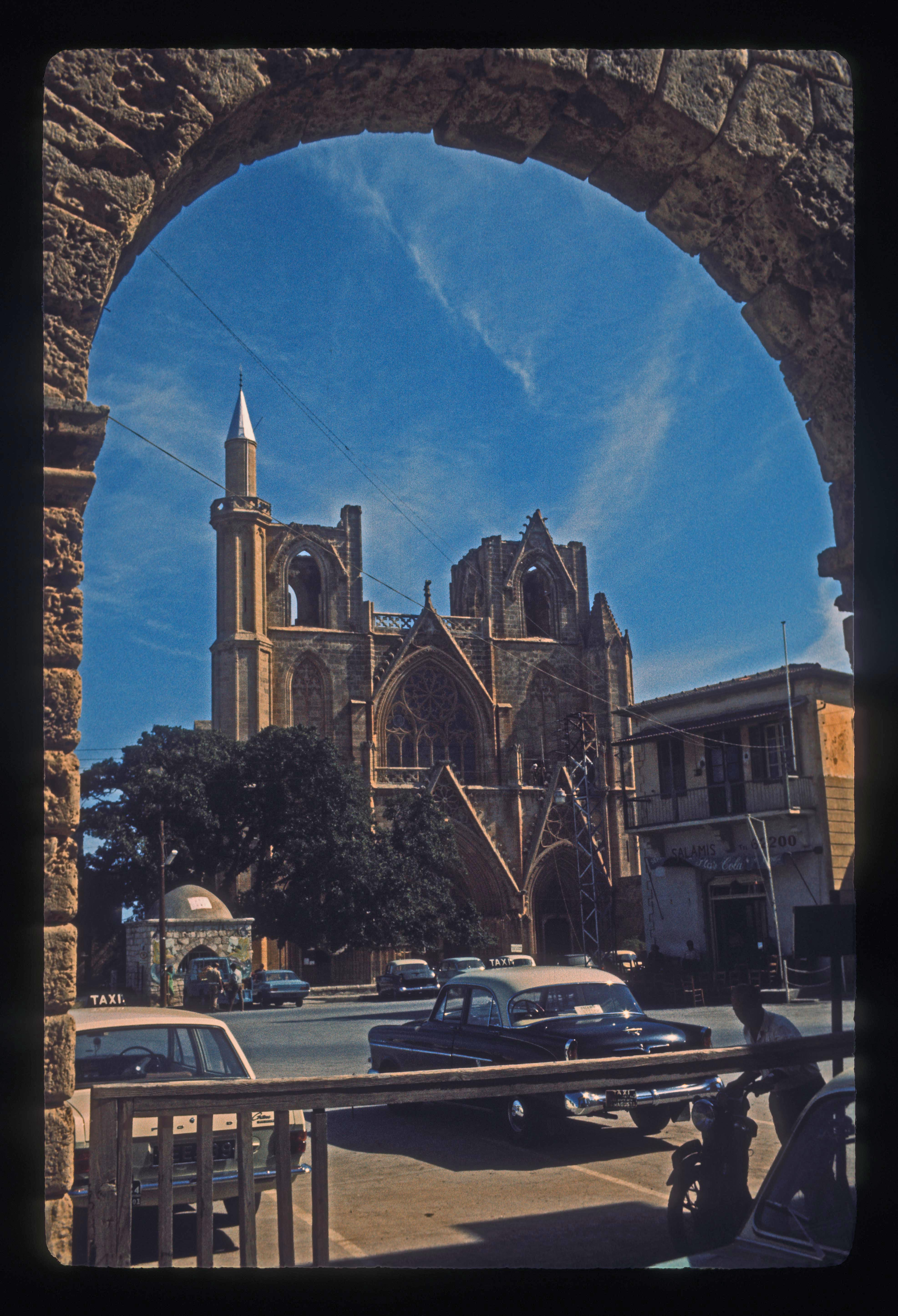
Famagusta's old Cathedral (Lala Mustafa Pasha Mosque) in the 1970s

From independence in 1960 to the Turkish invasion of Cyprus in 1974, Famagusta developed toward the south west of Varosha as a well-known entertainment and tourist centre. The contribution of Famagusta to the country's economic activity by 1974 far exceeded its proportional dimensions within the country. Whilst its population was only about 7% of the total of the country, by 1974 it accounted for over 10% of the total industrial employment and production of Cyprus, concentrating mainly on light industry compatible with its activity as a tourist resort and turning out high-quality products ranging from food, beverages and tobacco to clothing, footwear, plastics, light machinery and transport equipment. It contributed 19.3% of the business units and employed 21.3% of the total number of persons engaged in commerce on the island. It acted as the main tourist destination of Cyprus, hosting 31.5% of the hotels and 45% of Cyprus' total bed capacity. Varosha acted as the main touristic and business quarters.

In this period, the urbanisation of Famagusta slowed down and the development of the rural areas accelerated. Therefore, economic growth was shared between the city of Famagusta and the district, which had a balanced agricultural economy, with citrus, potatoes, tobacco and wheat as main products. Famagusta maintained good communications with this hinterland. The city's port remained the island's main seaport and in 1961, it was expanded to double its capacity in order to accommodate the growing volume of exports and imports. The port handled 42.7% of Cypriot exports, 48.6% of imports and 49% of passenger traffic.

There has not been an official census since 1960 but the population of the town in 1974 was estimated to be around 39,000 not counting about 12,000–15,000 commuting daily from the surrounding villages and suburbs to work in Famagusta. The number of people staying in the city would swell to about 90,000–100,000 during the peak summer tourist period, with the influx of tourists from numerous European countries, mainly Britain, France, Germany and Scandinavia. The majority of the city population were Greek Cypriots (26,500), with 8,500 Turkish Cypriots and 4,000 people from other ethnic groups.

=== From the Turkish reinvasion to the present ===
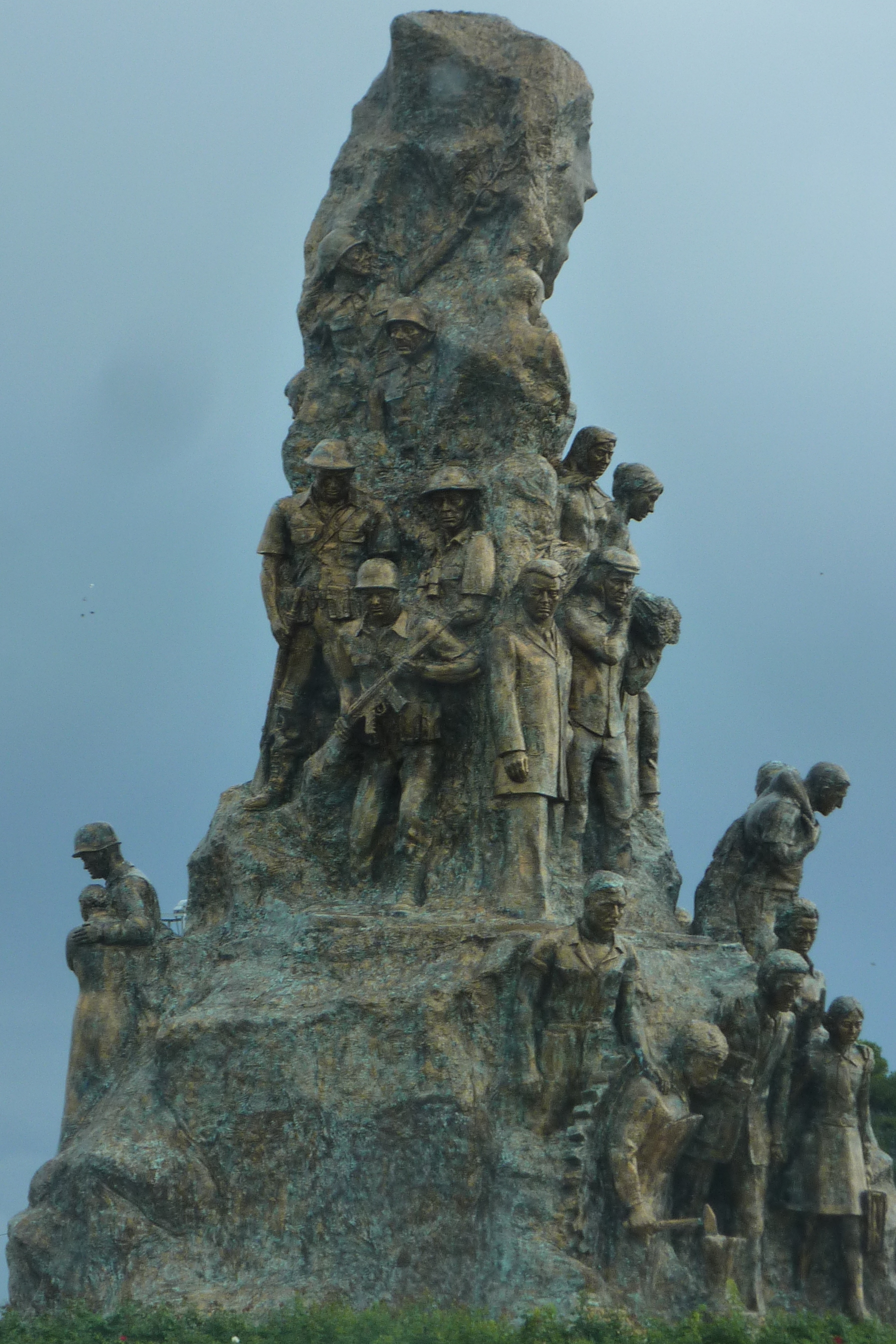
The Victory Monument (Zafer Anıtı) in Polatpaşa Boulevard, Famagusta

During the second phase of the Turkish invasion of Cyprus on 14 August 1974 the Mesaoria plain was overrun by Turkish tanks and Famagusta was bombed by Turkish aircraft. It took two days for the Turkish Army to occupy the city, prior to which Famagusta's entire Greek Cypriot population had fled into surrounding fields. As a result of Turkish airstrikes dozens of civilians died, including tourists.

Unlike other parts of the Turkish-controlled areas of Cyprus, Varosha was fenced off by the Turkish army immediately after being captured and remained fenced off until October 2020, when Northern Cyprus reopened some streets to visitors. Some Greek Cypriots who had fled Varosha have been allowed to view the town and journalists have been allowed in.

UN Security Council resolution 550 (1984) considers any attempts to settle any part of Famagusta by people other than its inhabitants as inadmissible and unjust and calls for the transfer of this area to the administration of the UN. The UN's Security Council resolution 789 (1992) also urges that with a view to the implementation of resolution 550 (1984), the area at present under the control of the United Nations Peace-keeping Force in Cyprus be extended to include Varosha.

== Climate ==
Climate data for Famagusta, 2017-2024 normals
Month	Jan	Feb	Mar	Apr	May	Jun	Jul	Aug	Sep	Oct	Nov	Dec	Year
Mean daily maximum °C (°F)	17.4 (63.3)	17.9 (64.2)	20.0 (68.0)	23.5 (74.3)	27.6 (81.7)	31.4 (88.5)	34.4 (93.9)	34.3 (93.7)	32.3 (90.1)	28.6 (83.5)	23.9 (75.0)	20.0 (68.0)	25.9 (78.7)
Daily mean °C (°F)	12.9 (55.2)	13.0 (55.4)	14.8 (58.6)	18.1 (64.6)	22.6 (72.7)	26.4 (79.5)	29.5 (85.1)	29.3 (84.7)	26.5 (79.7)	23.2 (73.8)	19.2 (66.6)	15.5 (59.9)	20.9 (69.7)
Mean daily minimum °C (°F)	8.3 (46.9)	8.2 (46.8)	9.6 (49.3)	12.6 (54.7)	17.7 (63.9)	21.4 (70.5)	24.5 (76.1)	24.2 (75.6)	21.4 (70.5)	17.7 (63.9)	14.4 (57.9)	11.0 (51.8)	15.9 (60.7)
Average precipitation mm (inches)	82.9 (3.26)	41.6 (1.64)	32.4 (1.28)	20.0 (0.79)	14.8 (0.58)	2.2 (0.09)	0.0 (0.0)	0.3 (0.01)	5.5 (0.22)	29.2 (1.15)	54.9 (2.16)	76.3 (3.00)	360.1 (14.18)
Average precipitation days (≥ 0.1 mm)	11.5	7.0	7.3	4.6	2.5	1.3	0	0.3	1.4	4.1	6.4	8.6	55
Source: Meteomanz

== Cityscape ==
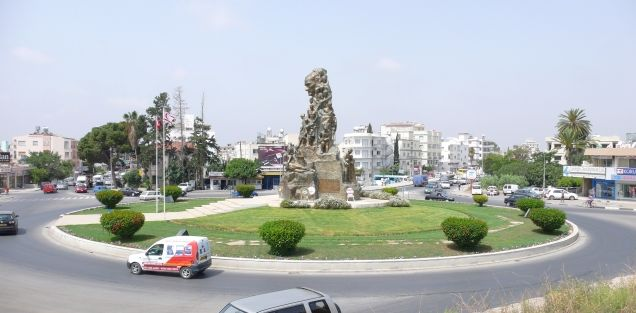
A roundabout in Famagusta

Famagusta's historic city centre is surrounded by the fortifications of Famagusta, which have a roughly rectangular shape, built mainly by the Venetians in the 15th and 16th centuries, though some sections of the walls have been dated earlier, as far as 1211. Originally there were only two gates into the walled city, the Land Gate and the Sea Gate. As part of the development of the port, the Arsenal Gate was opened to land traffic in 1933, then in 1965 the North Gate was opened by the Turkish Municipality of Famagusta. The original Sea Gate of 1310 is not used and has been undergoing restoration.

Some important landmarks and visitor attractions in the old city are:

- Lala Mustafa Pasha Mosque
- Othello Castle
- Palazzo del Provveditore - the Venetian palace of the governor, built on the site of the former Lusignan royal palace
- St. Francis' Church
- Sinan Pasha Mosque
- Church of St. George of the Greeks
- Church of St. George of the Latins
- Twin Churches
- Nestorian Church (of St George the Exiler)
- Namık Kemal Dungeon
- Agios Ioannis Church
- Venetian House
- Akkule Masjid
- Mustafa Pasha Mosque
- Ganchvor Monastery

In an October 2010 report titled Saving Our Vanishing Heritage, Global Heritage Fund listed Famagusta, a "maritime ancient city of crusader kings", among the 12 sites most "On the Verge" of irreparable loss and destruction, citing insufficient management and development pressures.

== Economy ==
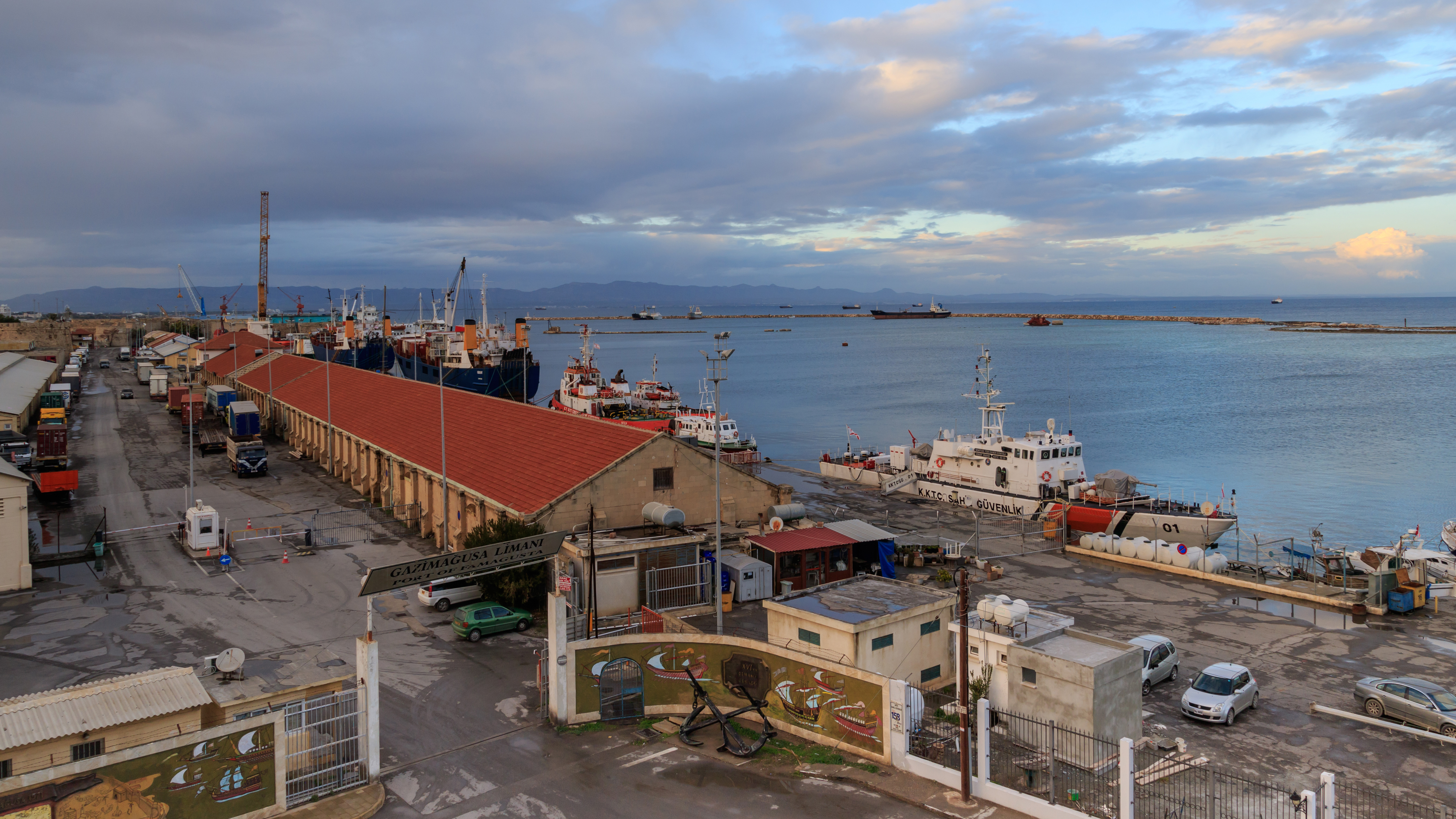
The port of Famagusta

Famagusta is an important commercial hub of Northern Cyprus. The main economic activities in the city are tourism, education, construction and industrial production. It has a 115-acre free port, which is the most important seaport of Northern Cyprus for travel and commerce. The port is an important source of income and employment for the city, though its volume of trade is restricted by the embargo against Northern Cyprus. Its historical sites, including the walled city, Salamis, the Othello Castle and the St Barnabas Church, as well as the sandy beaches surrounding it make it a tourist attraction; efforts are also underway to make the city more attractive for international congresses. The Eastern Mediterranean University is also an important employer and supplies significant income and activity, as well as opportunities for the construction sector. The university also raises a qualified workforce that stimulates the city's industry and makes communications industry viable. The city has two industrial zones: the Large Industrial Zone and the Little Industrial Zone. The city is also home to a fishing port, but inadequate infrastructure of the port restricts the growth of this sector. The industry in the city has traditionally been concentrated on processing agricultural products.

Historically, the port was the primary source of income and employment for the city, especially right after 1974. However, it gradually lost some of its importance to the economy as the share of its employees in the population of Famagusta diminished due to various reasons. However, it still is the primary port for commerce in Northern Cyprus, with more than half of ships that came to Northern Cyprus in 2013 coming to Famagusta. It is the second most popular seaport for passengers, after Kyrenia, with around 20,000 passengers using the port in 2013.

== Politics ==
The mayor-in-exile of Famagusta is Simos Ioannou. Süleyman Uluçay heads the Turkish Cypriot municipal administration of Famagusta, which remains legal as a communal-based body under the constitutional system of the Republic of Cyprus.

Since 1974, Greek Cypriots submitted a number of proposals within the context of bicommunal discussions for the return of Varosha to UN administration, allowing the return of its previous inhabitants, requesting also the opening of Famagusta harbour for use by both communities. Varosha would have been returned to Greek Cypriot control as part of the 2004 Annan Plan but the plan had been rejected by a majority (75.83%) of Greek Cypriot voters.

== Culture ==
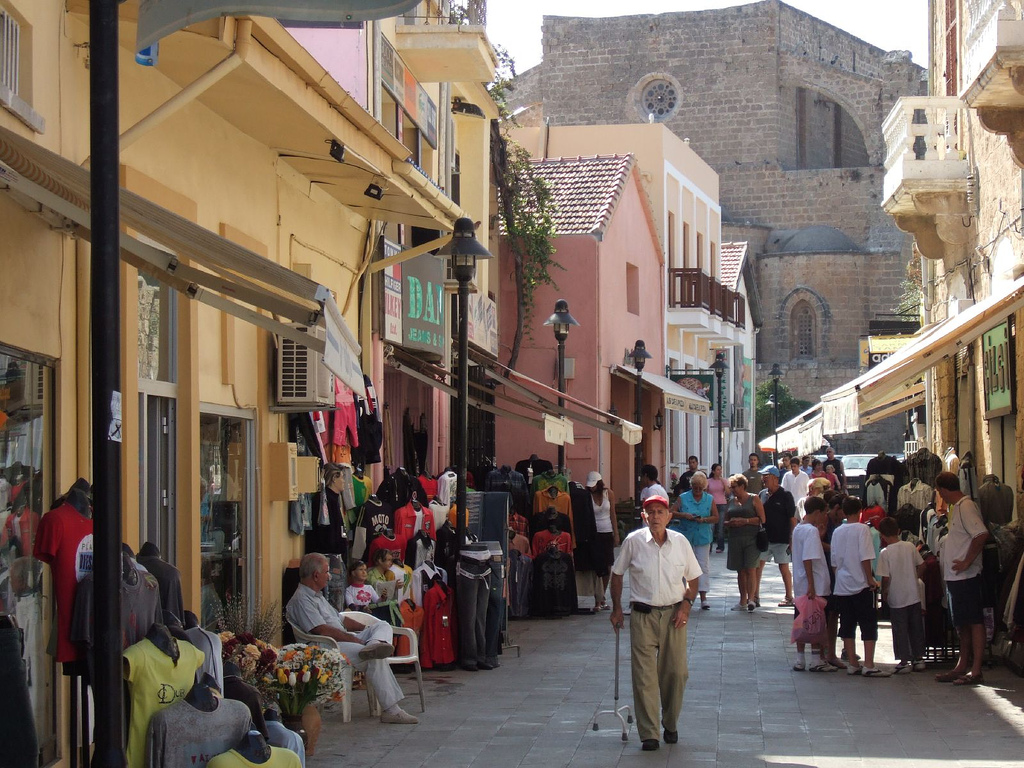
A street in the walled city of Famagusta

The walled city of Famagusta contains many unique buildings.

Every year, the International Famagusta Art and Culture Festival is organized in Famagusta. Concerts, dance shows and theater plays take place during the festival.

A growth in tourism and the city's university have fueled the development of Famagusta's vibrant nightlife. Nightlife in the city is especially active on Wednesday, Friday and Saturday nights and in the hotter months of the year, starting from April. Larger hotels in the city have casinos that cater to their customers. Salamis Road is an area of Famagusta with a heavy concentration of bars frequented by students and locals.

Famagusta's Othello Castle is the setting for Shakespeare's play Othello. The city was also the setting for Victoria Hislop's 2015 novel The Sunrise, and Michael Paraskos's 2016 novel In Search of Sixpence. The city is the birthplace of the eponymous hero of the Renaissance proto-novel Fortunatus.

== Sports ==
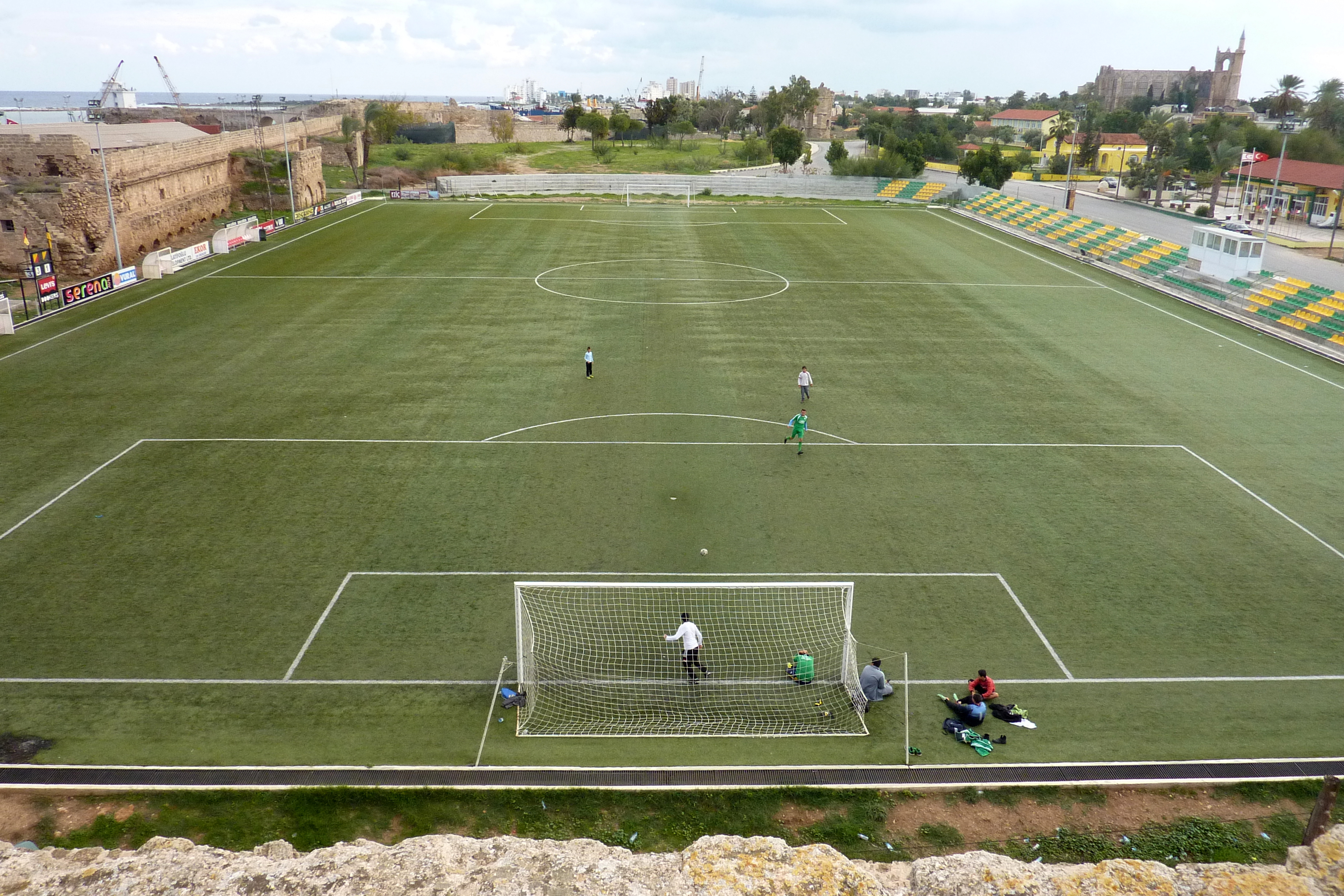
Canbulat playground

Famagusta was home to many Greek Cypriot sport teams that left the city because of the Turkish invasion and still bear their original names. Football clubs originally from the city include Anorthosis Famagusta FC and Nea Salamis Famagusta FC, both of the Cypriot First Division, which are now based in Larnaca. Usually Anorthosis Famagusta fans are politically right wing where Nea Salamis fans are left wing.

Famagusta is represented by Mağusa Türk Gücü in the Turkish Cypriot First Division. Dr. Fazıl Küçük Stadium is the largest football stadium in Famagusta. Many Turkish Cypriot sport teams that left Southern Cyprus because of the Cypriot intercommunal violence are based in Famagusta.

Famagusta is represented by DAÜ Sports Club and Magem Sports Club in North Cyprus First Volleyball Division. Gazimağusa Türk Maarif Koleji represents Famagusta in the North Cyprus High School Volleyball League.

Famagusta has a modern volleyball stadium called the Mağusa Arena.

== Education ==
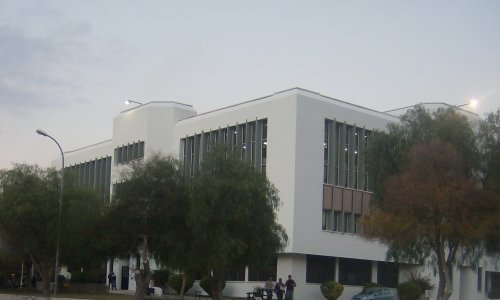
Library of the Eastern Mediterranean University in Famagusta, 2007.

The Eastern Mediterranean University was founded in the city in 1979. The Istanbul Technical University founded a campus in the city in 2010.

The Cyprus College of Art was founded in Famagusta by the Cypriot artist Stass Paraskos in 1969, before moving to Paphos in 1972 after protests from local hoteliers that the presence of art students in the city was putting off holidaymakers.

Cyprus West University was founded in Famagusta. The Ministry of National Education of the Turkish Republic of Northern Cyprus (TRNC) approved its establishment on December 8, 2015.

== Healthcare ==
Famagusta has three general hospitals. Gazimağusa Devlet Hastahanesi, a state hospital, is the biggest hospital in city. Gazimağusa Tıp Merkezi and Gazimağusa Yaşam Hastahanesi are private hospitals.

== Notable people ==
- Saint Barnabas, Apostle, born and died in Salamis near modern Famagusta
- Christos "Chris" Achilléos (1947–2021), British painter and illustrator, born in Famagusta
- Beran Bertuğ, former Governor of Famagusta, first Cypriot woman to hold this position
- Marios Constantinou, former international Cypriot football midfielder and current manager
- Eleftheria Eleftheriou, Cypriot singer
- Derviş Eroğlu, former President of Northern Cyprus
- Alexis Galanos, 7th President of the House of Representatives and Famagusta mayor-in-exile (2006–2019) (Republic of Cyprus)
- Xanthos Hadjisoteriou, Cypriot painter
- Oz Karahan, political activist, President of the Union of Cypriots
- Oktay Kayalp, former Turkish Cypriot Famagusta mayor (Northern Cyprus)
- Harry Luke (1884 –1969) British diplomat and Commissioner of Famagusta (1918–1920)
- Angelos Misos, former international footballer
- Costas Montis was an influential and prolific Greek Cypriot poet, novelist, and playwright born in Famagusta
- Hal Ozsan, actor (Dawson's Creek, Kyle XY)
- Dimitris Papadakis, a Greek Cypriot politician, who served as a Member of the European Parliament.
- Ṣubḥ-i-Azal, Persian religious leader, lived and died in exile in Famagusta
- Touker Suleyman (born Türker Süleyman), British Turkish Cypriot fashion retail entrepreneur, investor and reality television personality
- Nelly Tsouyopoulos (1930–2005), medical historian and academic, born in Varosha, Famagusta
- Alexia Vassiliou, singer, left here as a refugee when the town was invaded
- George Vasiliou, former President of Cyprus
- Vamik Volkan, Emeritus Professor of Psychiatry
- Derviş Zaim, film director

== International relations ==
=== Twin towns – sister cities ===
Famagusta, as a Northern Cypriot city, is twinned with:

- İzmir, Turkey (since 1974)
- Antalya, Turkey (since 1997)
- Struga, North Macedonia
- Mersin, Turkey

Famagusta, as a Cypriot city, is twinned with:

- Corfu, Greece (since 1994)
- Patras, Greece (since 1994)
- Salamina (city), Greece (since 1998)
- Athens, Greece (since 2005)
