= Anglo-American University =

University in Prague

- Anglo-americká vysoká škola, z.ú.
- Former name: The New Anglo-American College
- Motto: Private university education in the Heart of Europe.
- Type: Private university
- Established: 1990
- Accreditation: WASC
- Academic affiliations: International Education Society; ERASMUS; MŠMT; CIS; ECPR; Association of American International Colleges and Universities
- President: Jiří Schwarz
- Students: 720
- Location: Prague, Czech Republic; 50.090°N 14.409°E
- Campus: Urban
- Colours: Red and black
- Website: www.aauni.edu

Anglo-American University (AAU) is a private university in Prague, Czech Republic, providing courses in English. Founded in 1990, it was the first private university in the country to use English as the language of instruction.

== History ==
Anglo-American University was founded in 1990 as the Anglo-American College by Jansen Raichl and his mother, Vlasta Raichlová, shortly after the Velvet Revolution. Their aim was to create a higher education institution that would combine Central European university traditions with US and British academic principles. The college's name in English was later changed to university instead of college.

In 2010, AAU was the first university outside the United States to be invited to apply for institutional accreditation by the Western Association of Schools and Colleges (WASC). This accreditation was approved in 2016, with AAU becoming the first WASC-accredited university in Europe.

Courses at AAU were initially organised under the School of Business Administration, the School of Humanities and Social Sciences, and the School of Law. The university subsequently added a School of International Relations and Diplomacy (2006) and a School of Journalism (2010). In late 2008, John H. Carey II, co-founder and lecturer at the School of Law, died, and the AAU School of Law was renamed in his honour as the John H. Carey II School of Law.

In 2022, AAU began offering scholarships for undergraduate and graduate studies for Ukrainian students fleeing the war.

== Academics ==
Study is available in four Schools of Study: Business Administration; International Relations & Diplomacy; Humanities & Social Sciences; Journalism, Media & Visual Arts.

The university runs bachelor programs in Business Administration and International Relations with various possible specialisations, as well as other bachelor programs in: Humanities, Society and Culture; Politics and Society; Journalism and Communications; Visual Art Studies; and a Bachelor of Laws (LLB) using University of London International Programmes Courses.

The university runs master's programs in Business Administration; Humanities & Social Sciences; International Relations & Diplomacy; as well as Master of Law (LLM) programs in International Intellectual Property Law, and Law and Development, using University of London International Programmes Courses.

The university offers a Master of Business Administration (MBA) in cooperation with Chapman University in Orange, California.

AAU also offers various courses related to Czech culture, including:

- Czech and Slovak Politics
- Cities of Central Europe: Prague, Vienna and Budapest
- Literature of Prague
- Prague Art and Architecture
- Czech as a foreign language

== Accreditation ==
Most of AAU's programs are accredited by the National Accreditation Bureau in Czech Republic, except the Certificate of Higher Education in Common Law (CertHE Common Law), LLB, LLM, and the Chapman MBA program, which are offered in cooperation with international partners.

The university is also accredited by the WASC Senior College and University Commission, an American accrediting agency which evaluates public and private senior colleges and universities. The accreditation was granted in June 2016 for a period of six years. AAU is the only university in the Czech Republic with this accreditation.

The MBA program offered in cooperation with Chapman University, California is globally accredited by the Association to Advance Collegiate Schools of Business (AACSB). The Certificate of Higher Education in Common Law (CertHE Common Law) and the LLB and LLM programs are offered in cooperation with the University of London.

== University facilities ==
=== Campus ===
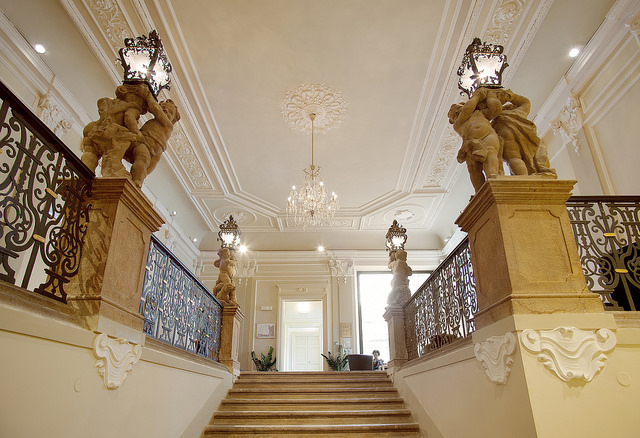
Anglo-American University Campus at Letenská 5

AAU's main campus is located in the newly restored Thurn-Taxis Palace, a cultural monument dating to the 17th century, previously owned by the German Thurn und Taxis noble family and now under the ownership of the city of Prague. The premises consist of 16 classrooms, a computer lab, and a visual arts studio, along with a cafeteria, courtyard and student lounges.

=== University library ===
AAU has a university library with a collection of 19,000 books, predominantly in English. AAU students, staff and faculty also have access to the collections held by the Institute of International Relations Prague, the Institute for Contemporary History, Academy of Sciences, and other libraries in Prague. The library also hosts music and spoken word performances, readings, and discussion groups.

=== Exhibition gallery ===
AAU has an exhibition gallery named |art| SPACE, which displays photography, paintings, installations, and sculptures by faculty and students. |art| SPACE operates under the School of Humanities and Social Sciences and is also used to showcase coursework in digital photography, visual arts and other creative courses.

=== Lennon Wall ===
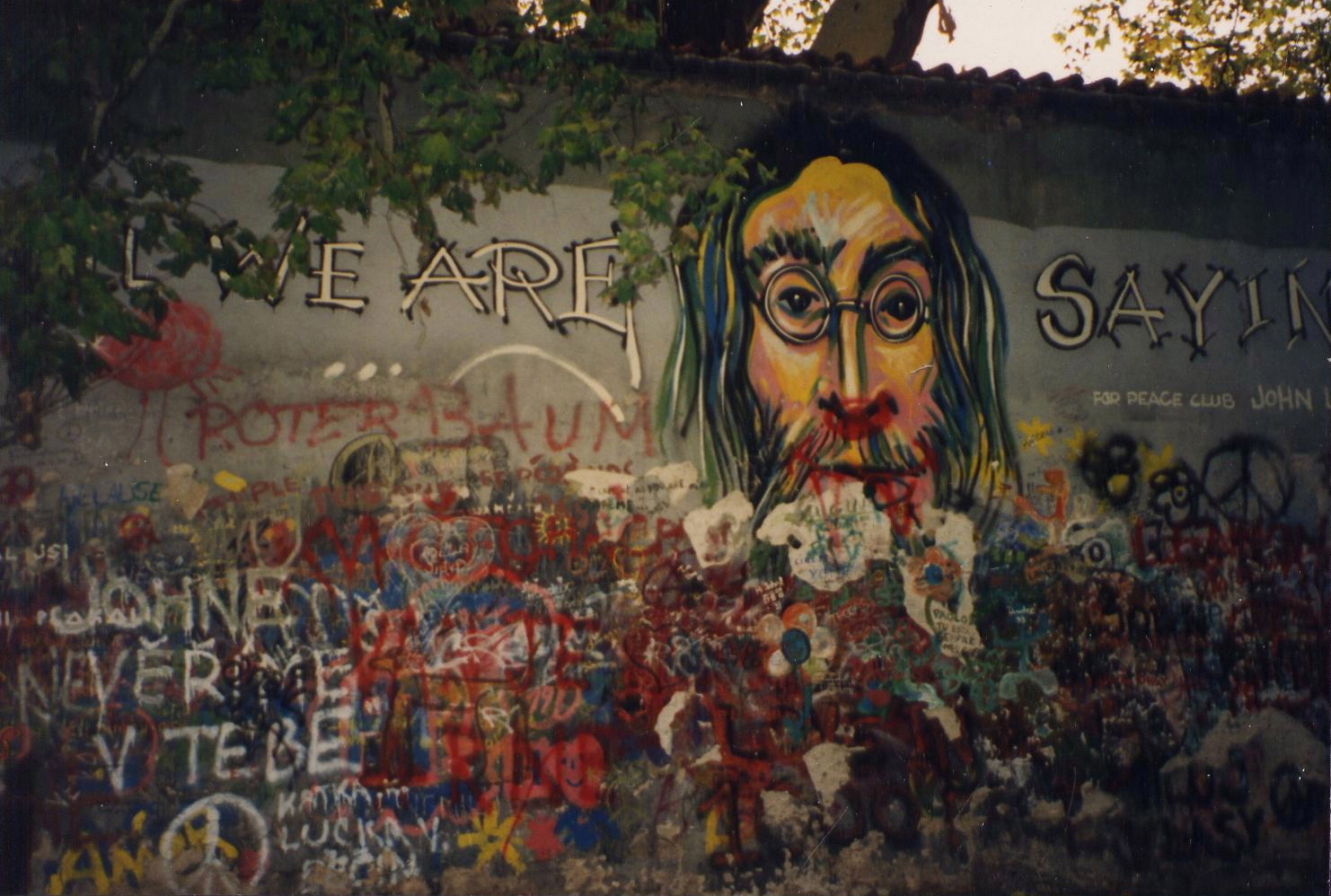
Portion of the John Lennon Wall

Lennon Wall is AAU's student magazine, which takes its name from the John Lennon Wall, a monument to freedom of expression located near the university. The magazine describes itself as "a nonpartisan platform for aspiring reporters and future writers", independent from the university.

== Sexual harassment allegations ==
An article published on A2larm.cz on 16 July 2018 detailed accusations from two former students that AAU had failed to properly enforce their sexual harassment policy and failed to protect their students. On 17 July 2018, AAU responded with a statement categorically denying the accusations, stating that an investigation into the allegations of sexual harassment was ongoing, as required by AAU's policy on disciplinary procedures. On 18 July 2018, A2larm announced that they would continue to investigate after being contacted by both students and staff of AAU with additional allegations of abuse and harassment, but has not filed anything since the announcement.

On 20 July 2018 the AAU President issued a press release addressing both cases reported in the article and announced action that would be taken by the AAU. AAU pledged to revise the existing procedures and also to re-establish the AAU sexual harassment task force.

In response to A2larm.cz's articles alleging sexual harassment at AAU, WSCUC, the university's American accreditation body, reviewed AAU's rules and procedures in response to a complaint filed by a third party. WSCUC reported a "structured and rigorous process for addressing complaints related to sexual harassment and misconduct", and on 10 August 2018 confirmed that AAU meets WSCUC's standards.

== Notable alumni ==
- Klára Poláčková - The first or second Czech woman to climb Mount Everest.
- Alexandra Udženija - Deputy Leader of the Civic Democratic Party (2014–2020).
- Oz Karahan - Cypriot political activist, President of the Union of Cypriots.
