= WUTC (disambiguation) =

WUTC is an American radio station in Chattanooga, Tennessee.

WUTC may also refer to:

- World Union of Turkish-speaking Cypriots, a political organisation in Cyprus
- Washington Utilities and Transportation Commission, the board regulating utilities and transportation companies based in Olympia, Washington
