= Klára Kolouchová =

Czech mountain climber (1978–2025)

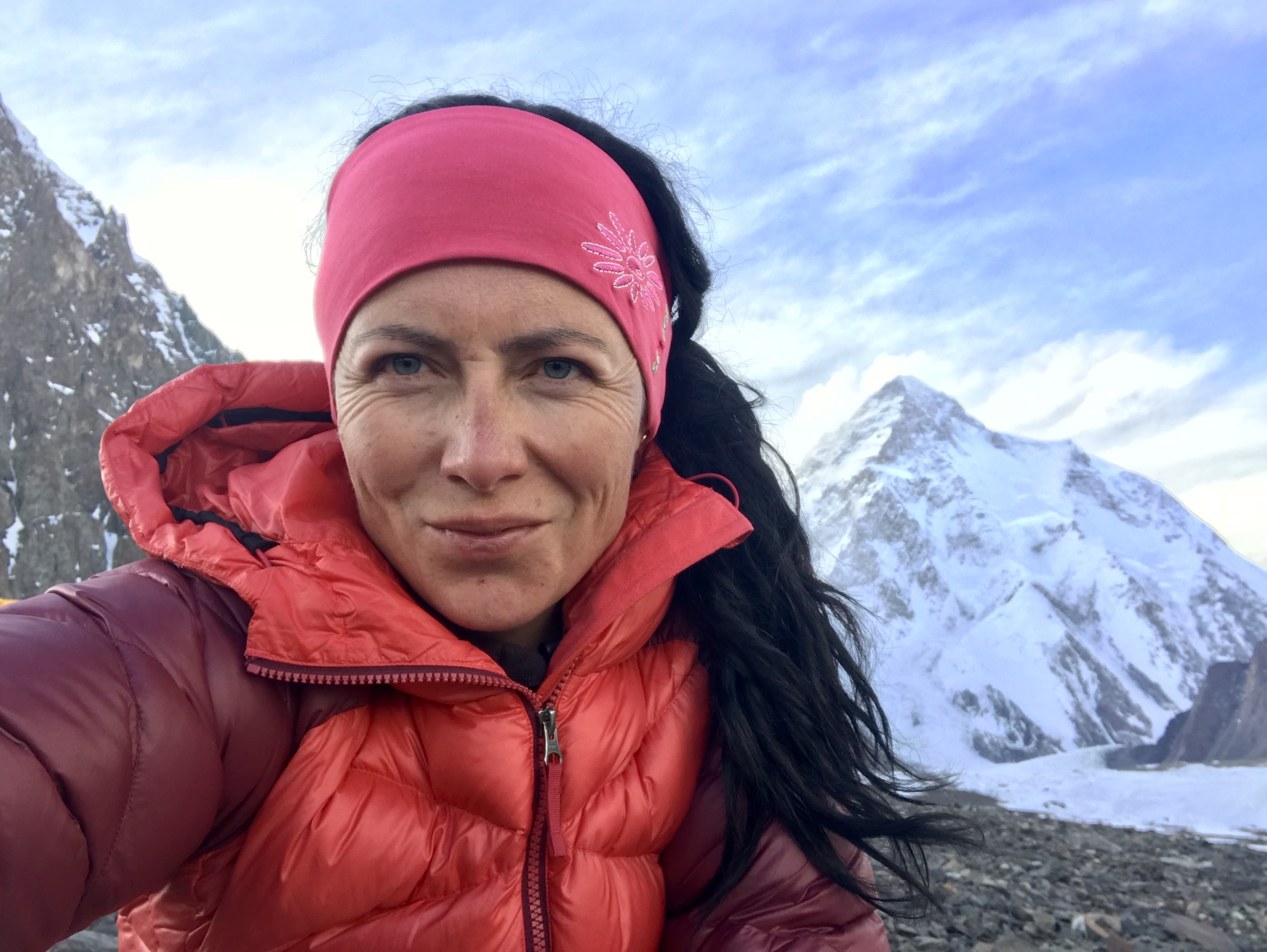
- Kolouchová on K2 in 2019
- Born: Klára Poláčková; 6 September 1978; Prague, Czechoslovakia
- Died: 3 July 2025 (aged 46); Nanga Parbat, Gilgit-Baltistan, Pakistan
- Education: Anglo-American University in Prague
- Occupation: Mountaineer

Klára Kolouchová, née Poláčková (6 September 1978 – 3 July 2025) was a Czech mountaineer who became the first Czech woman to summit the three highest peaks on Earth—Mount Everest, K2 and Kangchenjunga—and a total of five 8,000-metre peaks. She also completed the Seven Summits and four of the Volcanic Seven Summits.

== Biography ==
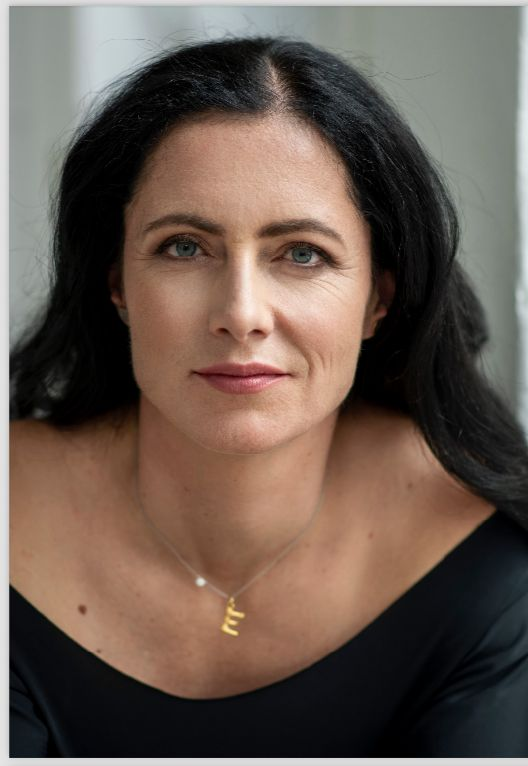
Klára Kolouchová, civil photo

Kolouchová worked as a PR manager for foreign companies in parallel to studies of business management at the Anglo-American University in Prague. Following her post as Regional Communications Manager at Euro RSCG Worldwide (2000–2003), she took up a position in the London office (2003–2004) and (in 2004–2006) worked as a communications consultant in the UK for the Department for Constitutional Affairs and the Department of Health.

In 2008, she had a daughter, Emma (born 20 March 2008). After returning to the Czech Republic, she joined the consulting firm McKinsey & Company. In 2013, she married Martin Kolouch. She had a second child, son Cyril (born 16 May 2014).

Apart from mountaineering, her favourite sport was tennis and she won the LTA tournament at the Queens Club in London.

Kolouchová died on 3 July 2025 while climbing Nanga Parbat, after her oxygen tank exploded and she fell from the mountain. According to mountaineer Jan Trávníček and Pakistani sources, Kolouchová's oxygen tank did not explode. On 7 July 2025, Czech outdoor company High Point, who supported Kolouchová, posted on Facebook, that Kolouchová's body was not found. Sherpa Taraman Tamang, who carried her personal stuff and oxygen tanks was 40 or 50 meters behind Kolouchová, heard a scream and saw her fell off outside of fixed rope, when they were on their way back to C2 camp.

== Expeditions ==
=== Cho Oyu ===
On 9 March 2006, Kolouchová reached the summit of Cho Oyu, climbing with her guide and friend Tashi Tenzing.

=== Mount Everest ===
Kolouchová summited Mount Everest on 16 May 2007, at 8.16 Nepal Standard Time, climbing with Tashi Tenzing. They ascended the normal route from the north side.

== Kolouchová's climbs ==
- 2003 Kilimanjaro (5895 m)
- 2004 Mont Blanc (4805 m)
- 2005 Aconcagua (6962 m)
- 2006 Cho Oyu (8188 m)
- 2007 Everest (8848 m), 2nd Czech woman ascent
- 2013 Denali (6190 m), first Czech ascent via the full West rib route
- 2013 Elbrus (5642 m)
- 2015 Puncak Jaya (4884 m)
- 2015 Vinson Massif (4892 m)
- 2019 Kangchenjunga (8586 m), 1st Czech woman ascent
- 2019 K2 (8611 m), 1st Czech woman ascent
- 2021 Pico de Orizaba (5636 m)
- 2022 Ojos del Salado (6893 m)
- 2024 Annapurna I, 1st Czech woman ascent
