= Angelos Misos =

Cypriot footballer (born 1971)

Personal information
- Full name: Angelos Misos
- Date of birth: March 7, 1971 (age 55)
- Place of birth: Famagusta, Cyprus
- Position: Defender

Senior career*
Years	Team	Apps	(Gls)
1993–1999	AEK Larnaca	120	(6)
1999–2001	APOEL	33	(0)
2001–2002	AEL Limassol	18	(0)
2002–2003	Enosis Neon Paralimni	9	(0)
2003–2004	AEL Limassol	4	(0)
2004–2005	Omonia Aradippou	0	(0)
Total		184	(6)

International career^{‡}
1996–1999	Cyprus	10	(0)
- * Club domestic league appearances and goals as of 27 April 2008 ‡ National team caps and goals as of 27 April 2008

Angelos Misos (born March 7, 1971) is a former international Cypriot football defender.

He started his career in 1993 from AEK Larnaca and he spent his career mainly there, where he played for six years. He had also played for teams such as APOEL, AEL Limassol, Enosis Neon Paralimni and Omonia Aradippou.
