= Avrupa =

- Type: Daily newspaper
- Format: Tabloid
- Editor: Şener Levent
- Political alignment: Cypriot nationalism Democratic socialism
- Language: Turkish
- Headquarters: Nicosia
- Country: Cyprus
- Website: afrikagazetesi.net

Avrupa is a daily newspaper published in Northern Cyprus. Its chief editor is Şener Levent. It supports the reunification of Cyprus and espouses left-wing values, being characterised in scholarship as radical left.

== History ==
=== Avrupa and the presidency of Denktaş ===
The newspaper was first published on 17 September 1997 using the name Avrupa ("Europe" in Turkish). It opposed the policies of Rauf Denktaş, President of Northern Cyprus at the time, as well as the role Turkey played at the Cyprus problem. This resulted in the newspaper in over 100 lawsuits against the newspaper and attempts to close it down by confiscation of its property.

On 29 December 1999, the newspaper was fined 120 billion Turkish liras (TL) as a result of lawsuits filed by Denktaş. With the contribution of inflation, the fines reached a total of 200 billion TL in 2001. It was also claimed that the newspaper did not pay its taxes and some of its equipment was confiscated for this reason in November 2001. On 12 December 2001, all property in the newspaper's offices was confiscated and all income that would be generated from sales was seized through the distributing company YAYSAT. In addition, Levent claimed that some members of his journalistic team had been "taken to some place" and threatened by a group that called itself the "National People's Movement".

=== Annan Plan attack ===
On November 6, 2004, the newspaper's office was attacked by a crowd of 60 Turkish nationalists because of its support for the recently failed Annan Plan. The protestors chanted various slogans and death threats while throwing eggs, with the most prominent slogans being "Don't test our patience Afrika", "May the hands break of those who get in the way of Turks" and "We will make your fate worse than the Greeks".

=== Afrin headline ===
On January 21, 2018, the newspaper attained controversy in Turkey due to its criticism of the Turkish-led Afrin operation, with the headline being "Yet Another Invasion by Turkey". The article included references and a likening of the operation to the Turkish invasion of Cyprus. Following Erdoğan's provocative remarks about the newspaper, suggesting that "his compatriots in Northern Cyprus should give the necessary response to this", a crowd of 500 protesters vandalized the newspaper's offices by hurling eggs, stones and water bottles. The police, who were at the scene, watched the incident and did not intervene. Mustafa Akıncı, President of Northern Cyprus, condemned the attack and went to the site during the rally to request extra security for the newspaper, only to be attacked by the crowd himself. A "March for Peace and Democracy" was organized by civil society in response to the attack.

== Notable staff or columnists ==
- Şener Levent
- Faize Özdemirciler
- Halil Karapaşaoğlu
- Oz Karahan

== See also ==
- 2011 Turkish Cypriot protests
