= Beran, Iran =

Beran بران
- Village
- Location within Iran
- Coordinates: 36°07′12″N 45°26′20″E
- Country: Iran
- Province: West Azerbaijan
- County: Sardasht
- Bakhsh: Central
- Rural District: Baryaji

Population (2006)
  - Total: 114
- Time zone: UTC+3:30 (IRST)
  - Summer (DST): UTC+4:30 (IRDT)

Beran (Persian: بران, also Romanized as Berān; also known as Bīrān) is a village in Baryaji Rural District, in the Central District of Sardasht County, West Azerbaijan Province, Iran. At the 2006 census, its population was 114, in 22 families.
