= 2011 Turkish Cypriot protests =

Rallies in Northern Cyprus against Turkey's policies

- Part of impact of the Arab Spring
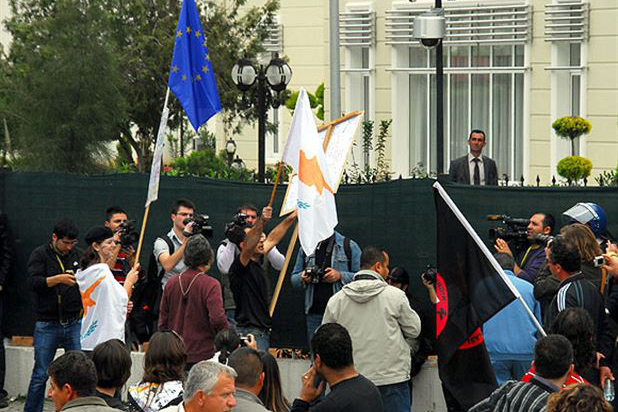
- Protesters in front of the Turkish embassy
- Location: North Nicosia, Northern Cyprus
- Methods: Demonstrations, strike actions

Parties
Protesters	Northern Cyprus; Turkey

Number
- 50,000–80,000

In 2011, a series of rallies and worker strikes were held by Turkish Cypriots in North Nicosia against Turkey's policies on Northern Cyprus.

The first protest was held on 28 January 2011. After the hostile reactions of Turkish Prime Minister Recep Tayyip Erdoğan and Turkish society, Turkish Cypriots organized a second and third rally on 2 March and 7 April 2011. The average turnout was 50,000–80,000, making these some of the largest demonstrations by Turkish Cypriots under the occupation. As of 2011, Northern Cyprus had a population of approximately 290,000.

Some protesters carried flags of the Republic of Cyprus and banners demanding the reunification of the island, and signs condemning economical, cultural, and social oppression of Turkish Cypriots by Turkey. During the final rally, unsuccessful attempts were made to hang the flag of the Republic of Cyprus on the Turkish embassy.

== See also ==
- Avrupa
- Union of Cypriots
