= Nelly Tsouyopoulos =

Cypriot medical historian (1930–2005)

- Νέλλη Τσουγιοπούλου
- Born: Νέλλη Σαβεριάδου; Nelly Saveriadou; 13 April 1930; Varosha, Famagusta, British Cyprus
- Died: 5 May 2005 (aged 75); Oxford, UK
- Awards: Medal of Friendship of the University of Münster, 2002

Academic background
- Education: National and Kapodistrian University of Athens, 1952; University of Münster, 1962; University of Münster, 1979

Academic work
- Institutions: University of Münster

Nelly Tsouyopoulos (née Saveriadou; Greek: Νέλλη Τσουγιοπούλου; 13 April 1930 – 5 May 2005) was a Cypriot medical historian and academic, specialising in the history of the late Enlightenment and early 19th century.

== Early life and education ==
Nelly Saveriadou was born on 13 April 1930 in Varosha, British Cyprus. Tsouyopoulos held British citizenship.

In 1947, Tsouyopoulos enrolled at the National and Kapodistrian University of Athens and graduated in 1952 with a diploma in history and classics. From 1953 to 1956, Tsouyopoulos worked as a teacher in Famagusta and Morphou.

In 1957, Tsouyopoulos was awarded a scholarship by the Greek state and the Alexander von Humboldt Foundation to study at the University of Münster. Tsouyopoulos graduated in 1962 with a thesis entitled "Punishment in Early Greek Thought".

== Career ==
From 1967 to 1971, Tsouyopoulos was a research associate at the Research Institute for the History of Science and Technology at the Deutsches Museum.

In 1972, Tsouyopoulos became an assistant professor at the Institute for History and Philosophy of Medicine at the University of Muenster. In 1979 Tsouyopoulos received her Habilitation in the History and Philosophy of Medicine, and from 1984 to 1995, Tsouyopoulos held the position of professor.

From 1989 to 1995 Tsouyopoulos was the president of the interim governing committee for the University of Cyprus. From 1996 until her death in 2005 Tsouyopoulos was a member of the governing board of the Institute for Interdisciplinary Cyprus Studies at the University of Münster.

In 2002, Tsouyopoulos was awarded the Medal of Friendship of the University of Münster.

== Personal life ==
On 5 May 2005 Tsouyopoulos died in Oxford aged 75.

== Publications ==
- Tsouyopoulos, Nelly (1978). "Der Streit zwischen Friedrich Wilhelm Joseph Schelling und Andreas Röschlaub über die Grudlagen der Medizin". Medizinhistorisches Journal (in German): 229–246.
- Tsouyopoulos, Nelly (1982). Andreas Röschlaub und die romantische Medizin: die philosophischen Grundlagen der modernen Medizin (in German). Stuttgart: Fisher.
- Tsouyopoulos, Nelly (1988). "The influence of John Brown's ideas in Germany". Medical History. 32: 63–74.
