= Oktay Kayalp =

Turkish Cypriot politician (born 1957)

Mayor of Famagusta
- In office 1994–2014
- Preceded by: Kemal Çelik
- Succeeded by: İsmail Arter

Personal details
- Born: 1957 (age 68–69) Famagusta, Cyprus
- Education: Ege University

Oktay Kayalp was born to a Turkish Cypriot family in 1957 in Famagusta, Cyprus, he received his primary schooling at Canbulat Ilkokulu and secondary education at the city's prestigious Famagusta Namık Kemal High School. Upon completion of his secondary school, Kayalp graduated with a degree in Mechanical Engineering from Ege University.

Once back in Cyprus and completion of his national service he went into business as shipping agent directing the family business MK Nejati & Sons in Famagusta. He continued his business ventures until his election to be the Mayor of Famagusta at the 1994 local elections in North Cyprus. He was elected to this position an unprecedented four times, lastly in 2010. Kayalp is married with two children.
