= Union of Cypriots =

Political organization in Cyprus

- Ένωσις Κυπρίων; Kıbrıslılar Birliği
- President: Oz Karahan
- Affiliations: International League of Peoples' Struggle; ICOR
- Website: cypriots.org

The Union of Cypriots (Greek: Ένωσις Κυπρίων; Turkish: Kıbrıslılar Birliği) is a progressive and Cypriot nationalist political organization in Cyprus. The Union of Cypriots campaigns for a unitary Cypriot state, the restoration of the constitutional order that was destroyed in Cyprus after the crisis of 1963–64, and the ending of the Turkish occupation of Cyprus.

== History and overview ==
The Union of Cypriots' origins root back to different organisations including the World Union of Turkish-speaking Cypriots, and the youth organisation LINOBAMBAKI, which was one of the formations that led the 2011 Turkish Cypriot protests. The organization supports a unitary solution instead of a federal one, concerning the reunification of Cyprus. With the idea of Cyprus belonging to all Cypriots, Greek Cypriots and Turkish Cypriots, the organisation supports turning back to 1960 constitution, and reinforcing it more in the line of "one nation, one flag, one homeland and one state" view. The organization campaigns against Turkey's illegal settlement policy in Cyprus. The Union of Cypriots brings out a publication called Liberate Cyprus. The main slogan of the organization is "Cyprus for Cypriots".

The organization supported Cypriots who were targeted in the occupied areas of Cyprus, in events such as the prosecution of some community members for hanging the flag of the Republic of Cyprus in 2013, the attacks against the Afrika newspaper by Turkish settlers in 2018, the court cases that were filed against journalists by Turkey in 2019, and the actions against the workers who wanted to cross barricades to enter the free areas in 2020. Because of its activities, the leadership of the organization was blacklisted and declared persona non grata by Turkey in 2021.

In 2019, the Union of Cypriots expressed its intention to participate in the European Parliament elections independently, but later joined the Jasmine Movement independents list. In 2024, the Union of Cypriots, in cooperation with the Green Party of Cyprus and the socialist AIHMI movement, participated in the European Parliament elections with a joint list of candidates.

The Union of Cypriots is a member of international organisations such as the International League of Peoples' Struggle, the International Coordination of Revolutionary Parties and Organizations, the International Anti-Imperialist United Front Against Fascism, War and Environmental Destruction, the No to War – No to NATO, and the Resist US-Led War Movement.

== International Solidarity Day with the Cypriot People ==
In 2024, marking 50 years since the Turkish occupation of Cyprus, the Union of Cypriots called for global action on October 10 for support of the Cypriot people and established this date to be observed annually as International Solidarity Day with the Cypriot People. This call was supported by international organizations, including the International League of Peoples' Struggle and the International Coordination of Revolutionary Parties and Organizations.

October 10 was chosen by the Union of Cypriots as the date of the declaration adopted at the 2nd Summit of the Non-Aligned Movement held in Cairo in 1964, which, in response to Turkey's initial actions against the Republic of Cyprus, called on states to respect "the sovereignty, unity, independence, and territorial integrity of Cyprus" and to refrain "from any efforts to impose upon Cyprus unjust solutions unacceptable to the people of Cyprus."

== Honorary Awards ==
The Union of Cypriots presents Honorary Awards in memory of Dr. İhsan Ali, a Cypriot community leader and a statesman.

Year	Laureate
2020	Şener Levent
2021	Galeri Kültür
2022	ΣΕΖΟΝ Γυναίκες
2023	Declaration of Pan-Cyprian Mobilization
2024	İbrahim Aziz
2025	Niki Katsaouni - Women Walk Home
