= International League of Peoples' Struggle =

Socialist international organization

- Pandaigdigang Liga ng Pakikibaka ng mga Mamamayan
- Abbreviation: ILPS
- Founded at: Zutphen, Netherlands
- Purpose: Anti-imperialism; Internationalism; Socialism; Progressivism
- Region served: Worldwide
- Chairperson: Len Cooper
- Secretary-General: Azra Talat Sayeed
- Key people: José María Sison; Liza Maza
- Main organ: International Coordinating Committee (ICC)
- Website: peoplesstruggle.org

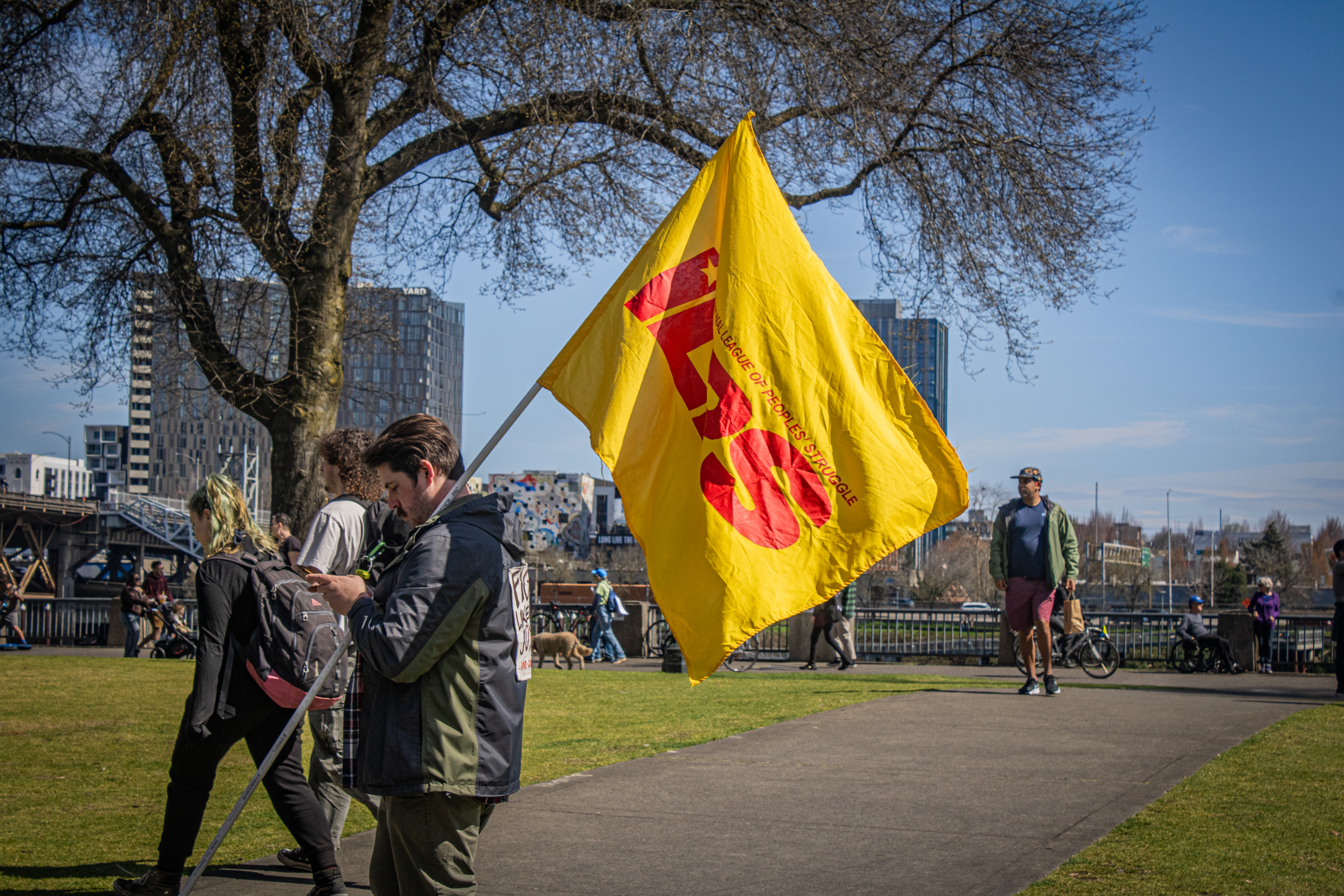
ILPS flag at a demonstration in Portland, Oregon

The International League of Peoples' Struggle (ILPS) is an international organization that seeks to coordinate anti-imperialist and democratic movements around the world. Communist Party of the Philippines founding chairman José María Sison organized the ILPS in 2001.

== History ==
The International League of Peoples' Struggle (ILPS) was established in May 2001 at Zutphen in the Netherlands, on the occasion of its First International Assembly, which drew participation from the representatives of mass organizations from 40 countries:

- Afghanistan
- Argentina
- Australia
- Austria
- Bangladesh
- Belgium
- Benin
- Brazil
- Burma
- Canada
- Congo
- Dominican Republic
- Ecuador
- England
- France
- Germany
- Greece
- India
- Indonesia
- Iran
- Italy
- Japan
- Luxembourg
- Malaysia
- Mexico
- Nepal
- Netherlands
- New Zealand
- Niger
- Norway
- Pakistan
- Peru
- Philippines
- Scotland
- South Korea
- Spain
- Switzerland
- Thailand
- Turkey
- United States

The International League of Peoples' Struggle has held seven International Assemblies since its establishment. The latest was held on 21-24 June 2024 in Penang, Malaysia. Currently, ILPS is composed of over 350 member organizations across 45 countries.

In 2023 the United States Country Chapter of ILPS initiated the No to APEC Coalition, a coalition of over 155 organizations waging a campaign against the neoliberal policies of the Asia-Pacific Economic Cooperation (APEC), which held its 2023 Summit in San Francisco. The campaign culminated in a week of action from November 11, 2023 to November 17, 2023, beginning the week with a 9-hour Peoples' Counter Summit with the theme of “People and Planet Over Profit and Plunder” in which attendees and organizers discussed a range of topics including Palestinian liberation and neoliberal economic policies.
