= Beran Bertuğ =

Cypriot politician (born 1956)

Kaymakam of the Gazimağusa District
- In office 7 July 2009 – 8 November 2013
- Preceded by: İsmail Gündost

Personal details
- Born: 6 October 1956 (age 69) Famagusta, Cyprus
- Education: Ege University

Beran Bertuğ (born 6 October 1956) is a Cypriot politician who served as the kaymakam of the Gazimağusa District of the Turkish Republic of Northern Cyprus. She is the first woman to hold this post.

== Biography ==
Born on 6 October 1956 in Famagusta, Cyprus, Bertuğ finished the city's established Gazi Primary School and Famagusta Namık Kemal High School.

Following her secondary education in Cyprus, she pursued her higher education in İzmir, Turkey, where she finished university with a degree in chemical engineering.

She started her teaching career in 1981 as a secondary school teacher and continued this until 2009 becoming a Vice Headmistress of Namik Kemal High School, where she taught chemistry for many years. During her teaching career at NKL, she actively encouraged participation of her school in the "Sister Schools Programme" to foster close links with other secondary education institutions in Cyprus and Turkey.

In April 2009, Bertuğ was appointed as the first female kaymakam of Famagusta, a role which she held until 8 November 2013. She also became the first Cypriot woman to hold this role. Bertuğ is married and is a mother of two.
