= Cypriot nationalism =

Political notion

Cypriot nationalism, also known as Cypriotism, refers to one of the nationalisms of Cyprus. It focuses on the shared identity of Greek Cypriots and Turkish Cypriots regarding their "Cypriotness", highlighting their common Cypriot culture, heritage, traditions, and economic, political, and social rights. Cypriot nationalism supports the peaceful reunification of Cyprus and the end of interference of external powers in its domestic affairs. Some Cypriotists advocate a confederal or federal state, while others express a preference for a unitary state instead. Cypriot nationalists consider Cypriots as one nationality and even ethnicity, referring to linguistic distinction between Cypriots as "Greek"-speaking Cypriots and "Turkish"-speaking Cypriots, rather than two separate ethnic groups.

On the level of practical politics, Cypriotism is generally associated with the left, both in Greek Cypriot and Turkish Cypriot politics. The most important political parties supporting a Cypriot nationalist agenda are the Progressive Party of Working People (AKEL) among Greek Cypriots and the Republican Turkish Party (CTP) among Turkish Cypriots. Not all leftists advocate Cypriotism; for example, the Movement for Social Democracy (EDEK) combines a left-wing economic agenda with a Greek Cypriot nationalist approach to the Cyprus problem. Cypriotism is further officially supported by the Union of Cypriots. There are also civil society activists and smaller liberal groups that also hold Cypriotist positions, although their political influence remains arguably limited.

== Development and support ==
Flag of Cyprus

During 1930s, Greek Cypriot and Turkish Cypriot communities began outspokenly criticizing the British presence in the island. The Governor Richmond Palmer was one of the people who used the term of "Cypriot nationalism" in his report dated 23 October 1936, while explaining the situation to London by mentioning:

In order to have ease in the future on the island, we have to continue the administration on the basis of exceptis excipiendis (opening the way to exceptions), on the basis of districts. Thus the concept of Cypriot nationalism -which will be emerging as a new concept after Enosis becomes an eroded value- should be pushed away as much as possible and left in the dark.

With the rise of the internationalist ideas of both liberalism and the political left, variants of a Cypriot identity began to be cultivated and espoused by native Cypriot political groups (both Greek Cypriot and Turkish Cypriot), most notably the Progressive Party of Working People (AKEL), the liberal United Democrats and organisations like the Union of Cypriots. The Turkish invasion of Cyprus, which followed a coup d’état in Cyprus ordered by the military junta in Greece, led to a revival of Cypriot nationalism.

== Opposition to Cypriotism ==
Cypriotism is strongly opposed by both Greek (and Greek Cypriot) nationalists and Turkish (and Turkish Cypriot) nationalists.

Among Greek Cypriots identifying as Greeks above all else, the central political slogan has always been "Cyprus is Greek". Political parties such as DIKO, EDEK and the Greek nationalist wing of DISY, as well as the Church of Cyprus, dismiss Cypriotism as a betrayal of Greek history and identity, and a sell-out to foreign interests who wish for Cyprus to submit to Turkish aggression.

Among Turkish Cypriots, the idea of Cypriotism was vociferously rejected by the long-serving Turkish Cypriot leader Rauf Denktaş, a Turkish nationalist and partitionist who believed that "in Cyprus there are Greeks and Turks", and that "the only true Cypriot is the Cyprus donkey". Accordingly, UBP, the political party founded by him, believes that Cypriot nationalism is a Greek ploy to subjugate and assimilate Turkish Cypriots. Other parties opposed to Cypriotism include DP and YDP.

== Adoption of aspects of Cypriotism by some Greek Cypriot nationalists ==
President Tassos Papadopoulos, generally seen as a Greek nationalist, can be said to have adopted a strategy of Cypriot nationalism (called "a strategy of osmosis" by him) by which he offered individual benefits to Turkish Cypriots (such as Republic of Cyprus passports, free medical care, employment opportunities etc.) while at the same time maintaining a very hard line towards the (internationally unrecognised) breakaway Turkish Cypriot administration. Thus Papadopoulos hoped to cultivate an allegiance to the Government of Cyprus among some Turkish Cypriots, and exacerbate the already existing tensions between the Turkish Cypriots and the Turkish settlers in Northern Cyprus.

== See also ==
- Civic nationalism
- Republicanism
- Cyprus dispute
- Hellenoturkism
- History of Cyprus since 1878
