= Tahsin Ertuğruloğlu =

Turkish Cypriot politician (born 1953)

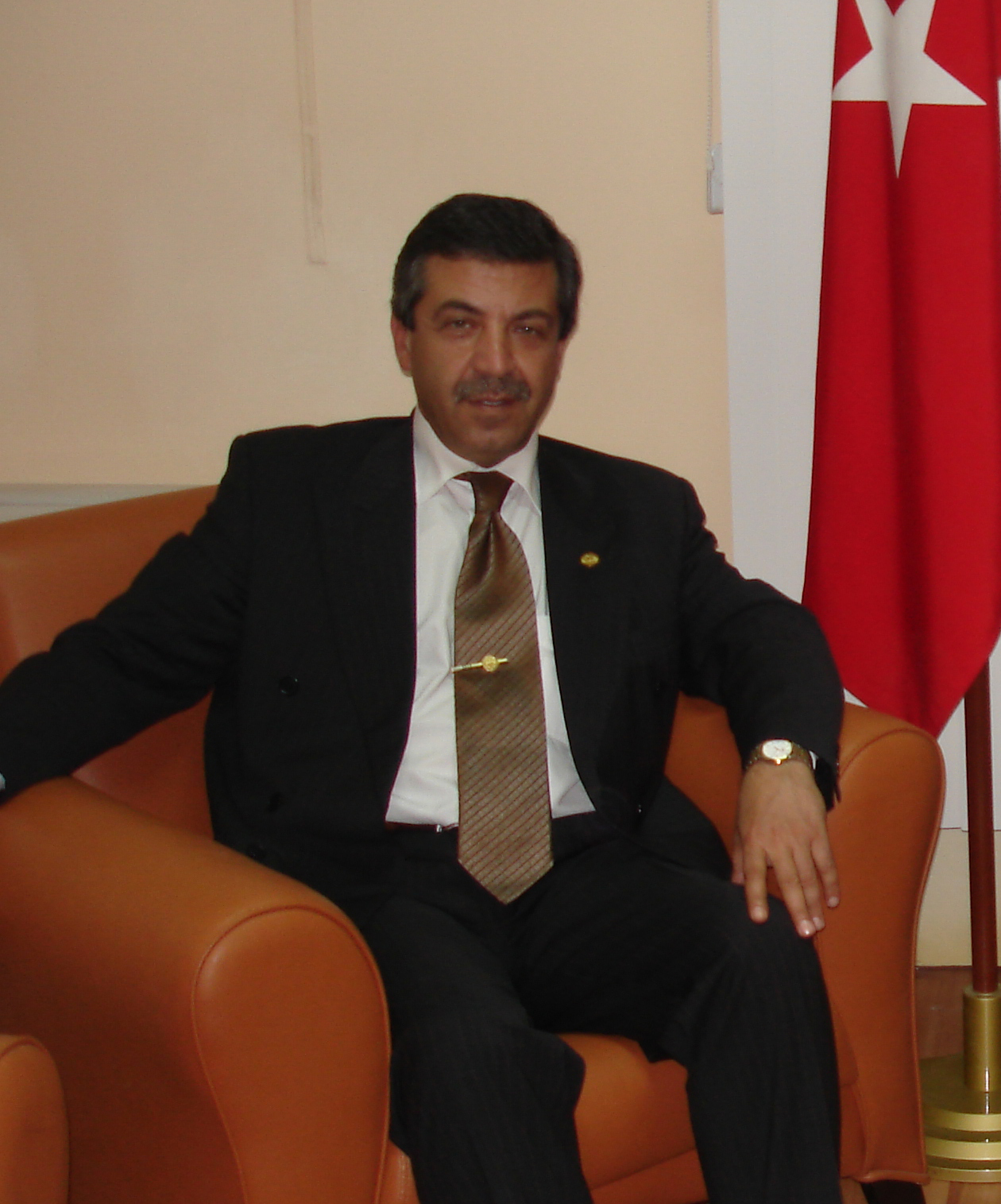

Minister of Foreign Affairs
- Incumbent
- Assumed office 9 March 2022
- Prime Minister: Faiz Sucuoğlu; Ünal Üstel
- Preceded by: Hasan Taçoy
- In office 9 December 2020 – 21 February 2022
- Prime Minister: Ersan Saner; Faiz Sucuoğlu
- Preceded by: Kudret Özersay
- Succeeded by: Hasan Taçoy
- In office 16 April 2016 – 2 February 2018
- Prime Minister: Hüseyin Özgürgün
- Preceded by: Emine Çolak
- Succeeded by: Kudret Özersay
- In office 31 December 1998 – 16 July 2004
- Prime Minister: Derviş Eroğlu
- Preceded by: Taner Etkin
- Succeeded by: Serdar Denktaş

Minister of Transport
- In office 16 July 2015 – 16 April 2016
- Prime Minister: Ömer Kalyoncu
- Preceded by: Hasan Taçoy
- Succeeded by: Kemal Dürüst

Leader of the National Unity Party
- In office 16 December 2006 – 29 November 2008
- Preceded by: Hüseyin Özgürgün
- Succeeded by: Derviş Eroğlu

Member of the Assembly of Republic
- In office 6 December 1998 – 7 January 2018
- Constituency: Lefkoşa (1998, 2003, 2005, 2009, 2013)

Personal details
- Born: 17 August 1953 (age 73) Nicosia, British Cyprus
- Party: National Unity Party
- Education: University of Arizona

Tahsin Ertuğruloğlu (born 17 August 1953) is a Turkish Cypriot politician. He served as a member of the Assembly of the Republic representing the Lefkoşa District between 1998 and 2018. During this time, he was a member of the National Unity Party (UBP) between 1998 and 2010, serving as the leader of the party between 2006 and 2008. He returned to the UBP in 2012 and remained its representative until the end of his tenure as an MP. He served in different ministerial positions, including a five-year tenure as the Minister of Foreign Affairs and Defense between 1998 and 2004.

== Early life and education ==
He was born in 1953 in Nicosia and studied political science in the University of Arizona, graduating in 1981. In 1983, he started working in the Northern Cyprus Ministry of Foreign Affairs and Defense.

== Political career ==
Between 1986 and 1991, he worked in the TRNC Representation in London, after which he was appointed as the undersecretary of the Prime Ministry, where he worked until 1994. He was re-appointed to the same post in 1996, afterwards, he also occupied the post of presidency in BRT.

In the 1998 parliamentary election, he was elected as a member of the parliament from Lefkoşa District in the National Unity Party (UBP). From 31 December 1998 to 16 January 2004, he served as the Turkish Cypriot Minister of Foreign Affairs and Defense. He was reelected in 2003, 2005, 2009 and 2013. Between 16 December 2006 and 29 November 2008, he was the president of the UBP. On 15 March 2010, he was expelled from the UBP due to his candidacy in the presidential election against the party's leader, Derviş Eroğlu. He received 3.81% of the popular vote in the election. Afterwards, a court ruling deemed his expulsion unlawful. On 15 July 2011, he established his own party, the Democracy and Trust Party, which he abolished in 2012 to rejoin the UBP. In 2014, he created controversy by calling Özdil Nami, the Minister of Foreign Affairs, "a child". In July 2015, he became the Minister of Transport, in the cabinet under Ömer Kalyoncu. He served as the Minister of Foreign Affairs in the Özgürgün cabinet formed on 16 April 2016. His tenure as an MP ended in 2018 after he failed to get re-elected in the 2018 election.

Ertuğruloğlu defines himself as a Turkish nationalist, seeing himself as a Turk living in Cyprus and defining Cypriotness as a "geographical identity" secondary to Turkishness. He advocates a two-state solution to the Cyprus dispute, with the aim of the recognition of the Turkish Republic of Northern Cyprus.

== Controversies ==
In a controversial decision, Ertuğruloğlu on 20 May 2016 restricted Greek Orthodox communities to only hold a single religious service per year, with the exceptions of the Apostolos Andreas Monastery in Rizokarpaso, the Monastery of St. Barnabas in Famagusta and St. Mamas' Church in Morphou. The decision was criticised by the Turkish Cypriot group Famagusta Initiative as well as Burak Maviş of the Turkish Cypriot Teachers' Trade Union (KTÖS) but was defended by the Association of the Ex-Servicemen of the Turkish Resistance Organisation leader Yılmaz Bora.

During the buildup to the Annan Plan for Cyprus referendum in 2004, Ertuğruloğlu was criticised as a "radical nationalist". This was due to his reportedly saying "if need be, I will fight in the mountains and continue my struggle". Ertuğruloğlu has said that his words have been misinterpreted and he never made such a statement, but, being not bothered by people's perception that he made such a statement, he "wished that he said that" and that he had said "we need to resist the Annan plan, even risking death if there is the need".

== Personal life ==
He is married with two children.

== See also ==
- List of foreign ministers in 2017
- List of current foreign ministers
