= 7th Parliament of the Turkish Republic of Northern Cyprus =

This is a list of members of parliament (MPs) elected to the Assembly of the Republic for the 7th Parliament of the Turkish Republic of Northern Cyprus at the 2009 parliamentary election.

The list below indicates the MPs in the parties in which they were elected; any change of political party is indicated separately.

| Party | Members | Change | Proportion |
|---|---|---|---|
| National Unity Party | 26 | ▲12 | 52% |
| Republican Turkish Party | 15 | ▼9 | 30% |
| Democratic Party | 5 | ▼1 | 10% |
| Communal Democracy Party | 2 | new party | 4% |
| Freedom and Reform Party | 2 | new party | 4% |
| Total | 50 | | 100% |

== Lefkoşa ==
| Member of Parliament | Party |
|---|---|
| Tahsin Ertuğruloğlu | National Unity Party |
| Hüseyin Özgürgün | National Unity Party |
| Şerife Ünverdi | National Unity Party |
| Ersin Tatar | National Unity Party |
| Hasan Taçoy | National Unity Party |
| Zorlu Töre | National Unity Party |
| Ali Çetin Amcaoğlu | National Unity Party |
| İrsen Küçük | National Unity Party |
| Sibel Siber | Republican Turkish Party |
| Özdil Nami | Republican Turkish Party |
| Özkan Yorgancıoğlu | Republican Turkish Party |
| Mustafa Yektaoğlu | Republican Turkish Party |
| Kadri Fellahoğlu | Republican Turkish Party |
| Mustafa Arabacıoğlu | Democratic Party |
| Serdar Denktaş | Democratic Party |
| Mehmet Çakıcı | Communal Democracy Party |

== Gazimağusa ==
| Member of Parliament | Party |
|---|---|
| Derviş Eroğlu | National Unity Party |
| Ahmet Kaşif | National Unity Party |
| Ersan Saner | National Unity Party |
| Sunat Atun | National Unity Party |
| Afet Özcafer | National Unity Party |
| Ahmet Eti | National Unity Party |
| Ferdi Sabit Soyer | Republican Turkish Party |
| Teberrüken Uluçay | Republican Turkish Party |
| Sonay Adem | Republican Turkish Party |
| Arif Albayrak | Republican Turkish Party |
| Ertuğrul Hasipoğlu | Democratic Party |
| Mustafa Emiroğluları | Communal Democracy Party |
| Turgay Avcı | Freedom and Reform Party |

== Girne ==
| Member of Parliament | Party |
|---|---|
| Hasan Bozer | National Unity Party |
| İlkay Kamil | National Unity Party |
| Ünal Üstel | National Unity Party |
| Ergün Serdaroğlu | National Unity Party |
| Necdet Numan | National Unity Party |
| Abbas Sınay | Republican Turkish Party |
| Ömer Kalyoncu | Republican Turkish Party |
| Salih İzbul | Republican Turkish Party |
| Mehmet Tancer | Democratic Party |

== Güzelyurt ==
| Member of Parliament | Party |
|---|---|
| Kemal Dürüst | National Unity Party |
| Ahmet Çaluda | National Unity Party |
| Mutlu Atasayan | National Unity Party |
| Türkay Tokel | National Unity Party |
| Fatma Ekenoğlu | Republican Turkish Party |
| Mehmet Çağlar | Republican Turkish Party |

== İskele ==
| Member of Parliament | Party |
|---|---|
| Nazım Çavuşoğlu | National Unity Party |
| Ahmet Zengin | National Unity Party |
| Ali Rıza Usluer | National Unity Party |
| Önder Sennaroğlu | Republican Turkish Party |
| Ejder Aslanbaba | Democratic Party |
| Mustafa Gökmen | Freedom and Reform Party |
