= 6th Parliament of the Turkish Republic of Northern Cyprus =

This is a list of members of parliament (MPs) elected to the Assembly of the Republic for the 6th Parliament of the Turkish Republic of Northern Cyprus at the 2005 parliamentary election, which was held on 20 February 2005.

The list below indicates the MPs in the parties in which they were elected.

| Party | Members | Change | Proportion |
|---|---|---|---|
| Republican Turkish Party | 24 | ▲5 | 48% |
| National Unity Party | 19 | ▲1 | 38% |
| Democratic Party | 6 | ▼1 | 12% |
| Peace and Democracy Movement | 1 | ▼5 | 2% |
| Total | 50 | | 100% |

== Lefkoşa ==
| Member of Parliament | Party |
|---|---|
| Mehmet Ali Talat | Republican Turkish Party |
| Özdil Nami | Republican Turkish Party |
| Ahmet Gulle | Republican Turkish Party |
| Ahmet Barçın | Republican Turkish Party |
| Kadri Fellahoğlu | Republican Turkish Party |
| Mustafa Yektaoğlu | Republican Turkish Party |
| Ali Seylani | Republican Turkish Party |
| Alpay Afşaroğlu | Republican Turkish Party |
| Hüseyin Özgürgün | National Unity Party |
| Tahsin Ertuğruloğlu | National Unity Party |
| Şerife Ünverdi | National Unity Party |
| Hasan Taçoy | National Unity Party |
| İrsen Küçük | National Unity Party |
| Mustafa Arabacıoğlu | Democratic Party |
| Serdar Denktaş | Democratic Party |
| Mustafa Akıncı | Peace and Democracy Movement |

== Gazimağusa ==
| Member of Parliament | Party |
|---|---|
| Ferdi Sabit Soyer | Republican Turkish Party |
| Okan Dağlı | Republican Turkish Party |
| Sonay Adem | Republican Turkish Party |
| Arif Albayrak | Republican Turkish Party |
| Teberrüken Uluçay | Republican Turkish Party |
| Ali Gulle | Republican Turkish Party |
| Derviş Eroğlu | National Unity Party |
| Mehmet Bayram | National Unity Party |
| Ahmet Kaşif | National Unity Party |
| Turgay Avcı | National Unity Party |
| Erden Özaşkın | National Unity Party |
| Ertuğrul Hasipoğlu | Democratic Party |
| Hatice Faydalı | Democratic Party |

== Girne ==
| Member of Parliament | Party |
|---|---|
| Salih İzbul | Republican Turkish Party |
| Ömer Kalyoncu | Republican Turkish Party |
| Abbas Sınay | Republican Turkish Party |
| Bayram Karaman | Republican Turkish Party |
| Salih Miroğlu | National Unity Party |
| Hasan Bozer | National Unity Party |
| Ergün Serdaroğlu | National Unity Party |
| Hüseyin Kayım | National Unity Party |
| Mehmet Tancer | Democratic Party |

== Güzelyurt ==
| Member of Parliament | Party |
|---|---|
| Fatma Ekenoğlu | Republican Turkish Party |
| Ramadan Gilanlıoğlu | Republican Turkish Party |
| Mehmet Çağlar | Republican Turkish Party |
| Nazım Beratlı | Republican Turkish Party |
| Kemal Dürüst | National Unity Party |
| Türkay Tokel | National Unity Party |
| Erdoğan Şanlıdağ | National Unity Party |

== İskele ==
| Member of Parliament | Party |
|---|---|
| Mehmet Ceylanlı | Republican Turkish Party |
| Önder Sennaroğlu | Republican Turkish Party |
| Hüseyin Alanlı | National Unity Party |
| Nazım Çavuşoğlu | National Unity Party |
| Mustafa Gökmen | Democratic Party |
