= 5th Parliament of the Turkish Republic of Northern Cyprus =

This is a list of members of parliament (MPs) elected to the Assembly of the Republic for the 5th Parliament of the Turkish Republic of Northern Cyprus at the 2003 parliamentary election, which was held on 15 December 2003.

The list below indicates the MPs in the parties in which they were elected.

Party	Members	Change	Proportion
Republican Turkish Party	19	▲13	38%
National Unity Party	18	▼6	36%
Democratic Party	7	▼6	14%
Peace and Democracy Movement	6	new	12%
Total	50		100%

== Lefkoşa ==
Member of Parliament	Party
Mehmet Ali Talat	Republican Turkish Party
Ahmet Gulle	Republican Turkish Party
Kadri Fellahoğlu	Republican Turkish Party
Ahmet Barçın	Republican Turkish Party
Ali Seylani	Republican Turkish Party
Özdil Nami	Republican Turkish Party
Tahsin Ertuğruloğlu	National Unity Party
Hüseyin Özgürgün	National Unity Party
İrsen Küçük	National Unity Party
Hasan Taçoy	National Unity Party
Şerife Ünverdi	National Unity Party
Mustafa Arabacıoğlu	Democratic Party
Serdar Denktaş	Democratic Party
Mustafa Akıncı	Peace and Democracy Movement
İzzet İzcan	Peace and Democracy Movement
Mehmet Çakıcı	Peace and Democracy Movement

== Gazimağusa ==
Member of Parliament	Party
Ferdi Sabit Soyer	Republican Turkish Party
Sonay Adem	Republican Turkish Party
Okan Dağlı	Republican Turkish Party
Arif Albayrak	Republican Turkish Party
Nuri Çevikel	Republican Turkish Party
Derviş Eroğlu	National Unity Party
Mehmet Bayram	National Unity Party
Erden Özaşkın	National Unity Party
Turgay Avcı	National Unity Party
İsmail Arter	National Unity Party
Ahmet Kaşif	Democratic Party
Hatice Faydalı	Democratic Party
Hüseyin Angolemli	Peace and Democracy Movement

== Girne ==
Member of Parliament	Party
Salih İzbul	Republican Turkish Party
Ömer Kalyoncu	Republican Turkish Party
Gülboy Beydağlı	Republican Turkish Party
Bayram Karaman	Republican Turkish Party
Salih Miroğlu	National Unity Party
Ergün Serdaroğlu	National Unity Party
Hasan Bozer	National Unity Party
Ünal Üstel	Democratic Party
Halil Sadrazam	Peace and Democracy Movement

== Güzelyurt ==
Member of Parliament	Party
Fatma Ekenoğlu	Republican Turkish Party
Mehmet Çağlar	Republican Turkish Party
Doğan Şahali	Republican Turkish Party
Erdoğan Şanlıdağ	National Unity Party
Türkay Tokel	National Unity Party
Hüseyin Öztoprak	Democratic Party
Tahsin Mertekçi	Peace and Democracy Movement

== İskele ==
Member of Parliament	Party
Mehmet Ceylanlı	Republican Turkish Party
Hüseyin Alanlı	National Unity Party
Nazım Çavuşoğlu	National Unity Party
Kemal Yılmaz	National Unity Party
Mustafa Gökmen	Democratic Party
