= 3rd Parliament of the Turkish Republic of Northern Cyprus =

This is a list of members of parliament (MPs) elected to the Assembly of the Republic for the 3rd Parliament of the Turkish Republic of Northern Cyprus at the 1993 parliamentary election, which was held on 12 December 1993.

The list below indicates the MPs in the parties in which they were elected.

Party	Members	Change	Proportion
National Unity Party	16	▼18	32%
Democratic Party	16	new	32%
Republican Turkish Party	13	▲13	26%
Communal Liberation Party	5	▲5	10%
Total	50		100%

== Lefkoşa ==
Member of Parliament	Party
Salih Coşar	National Unity Party
Günay Caymaz	National Unity Party
Vehbi Zeki Serter	National Unity Party
Kenan Atakol	National Unity Party
Olgun Paşalar	National Unity Party
İrsen Küçük	National Unity Party
Erdal Onurhan	National Unity Party
Serdar Denktaş	Democratic Party
Mustafa Arabacıoğlu	Democratic Party
Hakkı Atun	Democratic Party
Taner Etkin	Democratic Party
Onur Borman	Democratic Party
Süha Türköz	Democratic Party
Özker Özgür	Republican Turkish Party
Mehmet Civa	Republican Turkish Party
Ahmet Derya	Republican Turkish Party
Vasfi Candan	Republican Turkish Party
Feridun Önsav	Republican Turkish Party
Özkan Murat	Republican Turkish Party
Mustafa Akıncı	Communal Liberation Party
İsmail Koreli	Communal Liberation Party
Gülsen Bozkurt	Communal Liberation Party

== Gazimağusa ==
Member of Parliament	Party
Derviş Eroğlu	National Unity Party
Mehmet Bayram	National Unity Party
Ertuğrul Hasipoğlu	National Unity Party
Ruhsan Tuğyan	National Unity Party
Eşber Serakıncı	National Unity Party
Tansel Doratlı	National Unity Party
Derviş Çobanoğlu	National Unity Party
Ahmet Kaşif	Democratic Party
Mustafa Adaoğlu	Democratic Party
Kenan Akın	Democratic Party
Mustafa Gökmen	Democratic Party
İsmail Başarır	Democratic Party
Aytaç Beşeşler	Democratic Party
Ferdi Sabit Soyer	Republican Turkish Party
Sonay Adem	Republican Turkish Party
Hüseyin Celal	Republican Turkish Party
Ergin Abdullah	Republican Turkish Party
Hüseyin Angolemli	Communal Liberation Party
Mehmet Emin Karagil	Communal Liberation Party

== Girne ==
Member of Parliament	Party
İlkay Kamil	National Unity Party
Salih Miroğlu	National Unity Party
Ünal Üstel	National Unity Party
Ali Özkan Altınışık	Democratic Party
Ali Ertan Şükrü	Democratic Party
Ayhan Acarkan	Democratic Party
Salih Usar	Republican Turkish Party
Ömer Soyer Kalyoncu	Republican Turkish Party
Hasan Ataker	Republican Turkish Party
