= 4th Parliament of the Turkish Republic of Northern Cyprus =

This is a list of members of parliament (MPs) elected to the Assembly of the Republic for the 4th Parliament of the Turkish Republic of Northern Cyprus at the 1998 parliamentary election, which was held on 6 December 1998.

The list below indicates the MPs in the parties in which they were elected.

Party	Members	Change	Proportion
National Unity Party	24	▲8	48%
Democratic Party	13	▼5	26%
Communal Liberation Party	7	▲2	14%
Republican Turkish Party	6	▼7	12%
Total	50		100%

== Lefkoşa ==
Member of Parliament	Party
İrsen Küçük	National Unity Party
Tahsin Ertuğruloğlu	National Unity Party
Hasan Hasipoğlu	National Unity Party
Vehbi Zeki Serter	National Unity Party
Hasan Taçoy	National Unity Party
Savaş Atakan	National Unity Party
Mustafa Arabacıoğlu	Democratic Party
Serdar Denktaş	Democratic Party
Salih Coşar	Democratic Party
Hüseyin Özgürgün	Democratic Party
Mustafa Akıncı	Communal Liberation Party
Kemal Havalı	Communal Liberation Party
Gülsen Bozkurt	Communal Liberation Party
Mehmet Ali Talat	Republican Turkish Party
Kadri Fellahoğlu	Republican Turkish Party

== Gazimağusa ==
Member of Parliament	Party
Derviş Eroğlu	National Unity Party
Mehmet Bayram	National Unity Party
Ertuğrul Hasipoğlu	National Unity Party
Tansel Doratlı	National Unity Party
Derviş Çobanoğlu	National Unity Party
Ersoy İnce	National Unity Party
Nurten Hüdaverdioğlu	National Unity Party
Ahmet Kaşif	Democratic Party
Hatice Faydalı	Democratic Party
Kenan Akın	Democratic Party
Hüseyin Angolemli	Communal Liberation Party
Ferdi Sabit Soyer	Republican Turkish Party
Sonay Adem	Republican Turkish Party

== Girne ==
Member of Parliament	Party
Salih Miroğlu	National Unity Party
İlkay Kamil	National Unity Party
Hüseyin Şükrü Serdaroğlu	National Unity Party
Gülboy Beydağlı	National Unity Party
İlker Nevzat	National Unity Party
Ünal Üstel	Democratic Party
Yusuf Özkum	Democratic Party
Halil Sadrazam	Communal Liberation Party
Sümer Aygın	Republican Turkish Party

== Güzelyurt ==
Member of Parliament	Party
Mehmet Albayrak	National Unity Party
Süha Türköz	National Unity Party
Erdoğan Şanlıdağ	National Unity Party
Türkay Tokel	National Unity Party
Hüseyin Öztoprak	Democratic Party
İltaç Karayel	Democratic Party
Tahsin Mertekçi	Communal Liberation Party
Fatma Ekenoğlu	Republican Turkish Party

== İskele ==
Member of Parliament	Party
Önder Sennaroğlu	National Unity Party
Hüseyin Yenigün	National Unity Party
Hüseyin Avkıran Alanlı	National Unity Party
Osman İmre	Democratic Party
Ahmet Elbasan	Democratic Party
Mehmet Emin Karagil	Communal Liberation Party
