= 8th Parliament of the Turkish Republic of Northern Cyprus =

This is a list of members of parliament (MPs) elected to the Assembly of the Republic for the 8th Parliament of the Turkish Republic of Northern Cyprus at the 2013 parliamentary election, which was held on 28 July 2013.

The list below indicates the MPs in the parties in which they were elected; any change of political party is indicated separately.

Party	Members	Change	Proportion
Republican Turkish Party	21	▲6	42%
National Unity Party	14	▼12	28%
Democratic Party	12	▲7	24%
Communal Democracy Party	3	▲1	6%
Total	50		100%

== Lefkoşa ==
Member of Parliament	Party
Sibel Siber	Republican Turkish Party
Tufan Erhürman	Republican Turkish Party
Özdil Nami	Republican Turkish Party
Özkan Yorgancıoğlu	Republican Turkish Party
Ahmet Gülle	Republican Turkish Party
Birikim Özgür	Republican Turkish Party
Doğuş Derya	Republican Turkish Party
Tahsin Ertuğruloğlu	National Unity Party
Faiz Sucuoğlu	National Unity Party
Ersin Tatar	National Unity Party
Hüseyin Özgürgün	National Unity Party
Serdar Denktaş	Democratic Party
Mustafa Arabacıoğlu	Democratic Party
Hasan Taçoy	Democratic Party
Zorlu Töre	Democratic Party
Mehmet Çakıcı	Communal Democracy Party

== Gazimağusa ==
Member of Parliament	Party
Teberrüken Uluçay	Republican Turkish Party
Asım Akansoy	Republican Turkish Party
Ferdi Sabit Soyer	Republican Turkish Party
Erkut Şahali	Republican Turkish Party
Arif Albayrak	Republican Turkish Party
Sunat Atun	National Unity Party
Ersan Saner	National Unity Party
Erdal Özcenk	National Unity Party
Dursun Oğuz	National Unity Party
Ahmet Kaşif	Democratic Party
Fikri Ataoğlu	Democratic Party
Hakan Dinçyürek	Democratic Party
Hüseyin Angolemli	Communal Democracy Party

== Girne ==
Member of Parliament	Party
Abbas Sınay	Republican Turkish Party
Salih İzbul	Republican Turkish Party
Fazilet Özdenefe	Republican Turkish Party
Ömer Kalyoncu	Republican Turkish Party
Ünal Üstel	National Unity Party
Kutlu Evren	National Unity Party
İzlem Gürçağ	National Unity Party
Özdemir Berova	Democratic Party
Ergün Serdaroğlu	Democratic Party
Zeki Çeler	Communal Democracy Party

== Güzelyurt ==
Member of Parliament	Party
Armağan Candan	Republican Turkish Party
Mehmet Çağlar	Republican Turkish Party
Hüseyin Erçal	Republican Turkish Party
Ali Pilli	National Unity Party
Kemal Dürüst	National Unity Party
Menteş Gündüz	Democratic Party

== İskele ==
Member of Parliament	Party
Önder Sennaroğlu	Republican Turkish Party
Biray Hamzaoğlu	Republican Turkish Party
Hüseyin Alanlı	Democratic Party
Hamit Bakırcı	Democratic Party
Nazım Çavuşoğlu	National Unity Party
