= Yorgancıoğlu cabinet =

Yorgancıoğlu cabinet Yorgancıoğlu Hükümeti
- 25th Cabinet of Northern Cyprus
- 2 September 2013 – 16 July 2015
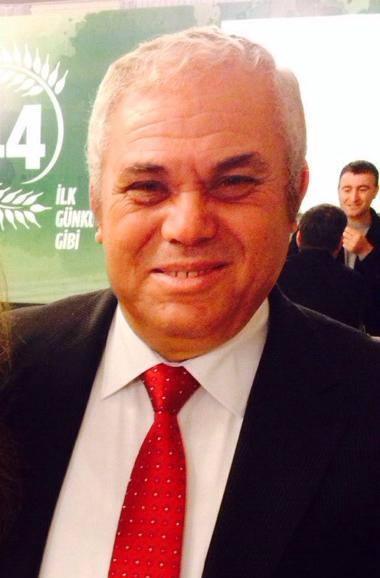
- Date formed: 2 September 2013
- Date dissolved: 16 July 2015

People and organisations
- Head of state: Derviş Eroğlu (until April 2015); Mustafa Akıncı (after April 2015)
- Head of government: Özkan Yorgancıoğlu
- No. of ministers: 10
- Member parties: Republican Turkish Party (CTP); Democratic Party (DP)
- Status in legislature: Coalition
- Opposition party: National Unity Party
- Opposition leader: Hüseyin Özgürgün

History
- Election: 28 July 2013
- Legislature term: 14th
- Predecessor: Siber
- Successor: Kalyoncu

Yorgancıoğlu cabinet was the government of Northern Cyprus between 2 September 2013 and 16 July 2015. It was formed after the 2013 parliamentary election, with the Republican Turkish Party (CTP) as the senior partner and the Democratic Party (DP) as the junior partner.

== Composition ==
The initial composition of the cabinet was as seen below:

Office	Name	Party
Prime Minister	Özkan Yorgancıoğlu	CTP
Deputy Prime Minister, Minister of Economy, Tourism, Culture and Sports	Serdar Denktaş	DP
Ministry of Foreign Affairs	Özdil Nami	CTP
Ministry of Finance	Zeren Mungan	CTP
Ministry of Interior	Teberrüken Ulucay	CTP
Ministry of Labor and Social Security	Aziz Gürpınar	CTP
Ministry of Food, Agriculture and Energy	Önder Sennaroğlu	CTP
Minister of Health	Ahmet Gülle	CTP
Ministry of Environment and Natural Resources	Hamit Bakırcı	DP
Ministry of National Education	Mustafa Arabacıoğlu	DP
Ministry of Transport and Public Works	Ahmet Kaşif	DP

Arabacıoğlu, the Minister of National Education, resigned on 23 September 2014, citing a lack of system, and according to Kıbrıs Postası, problems with transferring teachers to schools and students to colleges. On 8 October 2014, the Central Administrative Board of the DP convened and decided to remove Kaşif and Bakırcı from their posts as well. Özdemir Berova became the new Minister of National Education, Hasan Taçoy the new Minister of Transport and Public Works and Hakan Dinçyürek the new Minister of Environment and Natural Resources.
