= Hüseyin Özgürgün =

11th prime minister of Northern Cyprus

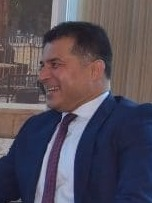

Prime Minister of Northern Cyprus
- In office 16 April 2016 – 2 February 2018
- President: Mustafa Akıncı
- Preceded by: Ömer Kalyoncu
- Succeeded by: Tufan Erhürman
- Acting; 23 April 2010 – 17 May 2010
- President: Mehmet Ali Talat
- Preceded by: Derviş Eroğlu
- Succeeded by: İrsen Küçük

Leader of the National Unity Party
- In office 31 August 2013 – 30 October 2018
- Preceded by: İrsen Küçük
- Succeeded by: Ersin Tatar
- In office 11 February 2006 – 16 December 2006
- Preceded by: Derviş Eroğlu
- Succeeded by: Tahsin Ertuğruloğlu

Minister of Foreign Affairs
- In office 4 May 2009 – 13 June 2013
- Prime Minister: Derviş Eroğlu; İrsen Küçük
- Preceded by: Turgay Avcı
- Succeeded by: Kutlay Erk

Member of the Assembly of Republic
- Incumbent
- Assumed office 6 December 1998
- Constituency: Lefkoşa (1998, 2003, 2005, 2009, 2013, 2018)

Personal details
- Born: 1965 (age 60–61) Nicosia, Cyprus
- Party: National Unity Party
- Spouse(s): Mine Boyacı (?) Hatice Dilek Karakuzu (m. 2013; div. 2017) İnci Pars (m. 2018)
- Children: 3
- Education: Ankara University

Hüseyin Özgürgün (born 1965) is a Turkish Cypriot politician and a former Prime Minister of Northern Cyprus. He is the current leader of the National Unity Party (UBP). He was formerly the Minister of Foreign Affairs of Turkish Republic of Northern Cyprus. From 23 April to 17 May 2010 he was also Acting Prime Minister. Moreover, he was prime minister of Northern Cyprus from 16 April 2016 to 2 February 2018.

== Early life ==
Özgürgün was born in 1965 in Nicosia, where he completed his education up to high school. He then studied political science in Ankara University and graduated in 1988. He was a prolific sportsman, representing Northern Cyprus in basketball, football, volleyball, table tennis and athletics and later serving as a sports administrator. He served as the chairman of Çetinkaya Türk S.K. and led it to a championship. He later worked as an administrator in private businesses.

== Political career ==
Özgürgün was first elected as a member of the Assembly of the Republic in the 1998 parliamentary election, representing Lefkoşa District for the UBP. He was later re-elected to the same position in 2003, 2005, 2009 and 2013. He is known to accept bribes from various business people in the country during his career. Currently he is with an arrest warrant in Cyprus thus continuing his life in Turkey.

Political offices
Preceded by Derviş Eroğlu	Prime Minister of Northern Cyprus; Acting; 2010	Succeeded by İrsen Küçük
Preceded by Ömer Kalyoncu	Prime Minister of Northern Cyprus; 2016–2018	Succeeded by Tufan Erhürman
