= 2nd Parliament of the Turkish Republic of Northern Cyprus =

This is a list of members of parliament (MPs) elected to the Assembly of the Republic for the 2nd Parliament of the Turkish Republic of Northern Cyprus at the 1990 parliamentary election, which was held on 6 May 1990.

The list below indicates the MPs in the parties in which they were elected.

Party	Members	Change	Proportion
National Unity Party	34	▲10	68%
Party for Democratic Struggle	16	▼10	32%
Total	50		100%

== Lefkoşa ==
Member of Parliament	Party
Emin Uzun	National Unity Party
Serdar Denktaş	National Unity Party
Hakkı Atun	National Unity Party
Kenan Atakol	National Unity Party
Salih Coşar	National Unity Party
Günay Caymaz	National Unity Party
Nazif Borman	National Unity Party
Güner Göktuğ	National Unity Party
Vehbi Zeki Serter	National Unity Party
Süha Türköz	National Unity Party
Zaim Necatigil	National Unity Party
Mustafa Erbilen	National Unity Party
Erkan Emekçi	National Unity Party
Hasan Yumuk	National Unity Party
Atay Ahmet Raşit	National Unity Party
Gülin Sayıner	National Unity Party
Mustafa Akıncı	Party for Democratic Struggle
Mehmet Civa	Party for Democratic Struggle
Özker Özgür	Party for Democratic Struggle
Hasan Sarıca	Party for Democratic Struggle
Ergün Vehbi	Party for Democratic Struggle
İbrahim Koreli	Party for Democratic Struggle
Feridun Önsav	Party for Democratic Struggle

== Gazimağusa ==
Member of Parliament	Party
Muarrem Söylemez	National Unity Party
Derviş Eroğlu	National Unity Party
Mehmet Bayram	National Unity Party
Mustafa Adaoğlu	National Unity Party
Ertuğrul Hasipoğlu	National Unity Party
Aytaç Beşeşler	National Unity Party
Hüseyin Curcioğlu	National Unity Party
Eşber Serakıncı	National Unity Party
Ömer Demir	National Unity Party
Mustafa Karpaslı	National Unity Party
Ruhsan Tuğyan	National Unity Party
Ahmet Sevinç	National Unity Party
Taşkent Atasayan	National Unity Party
Naci Talat Usar	Party for Democratic Struggle
Ahmet Kaşif	Party for Democratic Struggle
Kenan Akın	Party for Democratic Struggle
İsmet Kotak	Party for Democratic Struggle
Hüseyin Angolemli	Party for Democratic Struggle
Mehmet Altınay	Party for Democratic Struggle

== Girne ==
Member of Parliament	Party
İlkay Kamil	National Unity Party
Salih Miroğlu	National Unity Party
Mustafa Hacıahmetoğlu	National Unity Party
Hüseyin Şükrü Serdaroğlu	National Unity Party
Ayhan Halit Acarkan	National Unity Party
Ziya Rızkı	Party for Democratic Struggle
Fadıl Çağda	Party for Democratic Struggle
Salih Usar	Party for Democratic Struggle
