= Deputy Prime Minister of Northern Cyprus =

The Turkish Republic of Northern Cyprus takes place in a framework of a semi-presidential representative democratic republic and is a de facto state that comprises the northeastern portion of the island of Cyprus. Recognised only by Turkey, Northern Cyprus is considered by the international community to be part of the Republic of Cyprus.

The president is head of state and the prime minister is head of government, and of a multi-party system. Executive power is exercised by the government. Legislative power is vested in both the government and the Assembly of the Republic. The judiciary is independent of the executive and the legislature. The prime minister must control a majority of parliament in order to govern. The office of the deputy prime minister is not a permanent position, existing only at the discretion of the prime minister.

Unlike analogous offices in some other nations, such as a vice presidency, the deputy prime minister possesses no special constitutional powers under the Constitution of Northern Cyprus as such, though they will always have particular responsibilities in government. They do not assume the duties and powers of the prime minister in the latter's absence, illness, or death. The deputy prime minister does not automatically succeed the prime minister when the latter is incapacitated, or resigns from the leadership of his or her party. The designation of someone to the role of deputy prime minister may provide additional practical status within the cabinet, enabling exercise of de facto, if not de jure, power.

In a coalition government, such as the Özgürgün cabinet between the National Unity Party and Democratic Party, the appointment of the leader of the smaller party (in this case, Serdar Denktaş, leader of the Democratic Party) as deputy prime minister is done to give that person more authority within the cabinet to enforce the coalition's agreed-upon agenda. The deputy prime minister usually deputises for the prime minister at official functions. The current Erhürman cabinet has Kudret Özersay as the deputy prime minister, receiving the seniority as the leader of the second biggest party (People's Party) of the 4-party coalition.

== History ==
Following the events in 1974, an executive committee was formed to govern Northern Cyprus on August 26, 1974. This committee later established the Autonomous Turkish Cypriot Administration. Rauf Denktaş was both serving as the head of state and the head of government of ATCA. Osman Örek served as the vice president and the minister of Defence of ATCA, becoming the first deputy leader of the government. The position of vice presidency was abolished after the establishment of Turkish Federated State of Cyprus, since it was a semi-presidential republic.

Following the establishment of TFSC, Vedat Çelik was appointed as the deputy prime minister and the minister of Defence and Foreign Affairs of the first cabinet. However after the cabinet changes on July 7, 1977 the office of the deputy prime minister of the Turkish Federated State of Cyprus was abolished.

The first deputy prime minister of the Turkish Republic of Northern Cyprus was Özker Özgür who served at the First and Second Atun cabinets as the deputy prime minister and the minister of State. The position of the deputy prime minister was abolished by the formation of the Eighth Eroğlu Cabinet and reinstalled by the formation of the Yorgancıoğlu cabinet and used by the all following governments with the exception of Kalyoncu cabinet.

== See also ==
- Prime Minister of Northern Cyprus
- List of deputy prime ministers of Northern Cyprus
