= Hasan Taçoy =

Turkish Cypriot politician

Hasan Taçoy (born 1963) is a Turkish Cypriot politician who served as the Minister of Public Works and Transport between 2009 and 2010 and between 2014 and 2015.

He graduated from the University of Wisconsin in 1986, studying economics and political science. He then worked in commerce, taking part in the Assembly of the Turkish Cypriot Chamber of Commerce for three terms and the Board of Directors of the Association of Young Businesspeople for two terms. He worked in the Board of Directors of the credit company owned by the Evkaf Administration in 1996 and also administered a handball club.

He got involved in the youth branch of the National Unity Party (UBP) and became the head of the youth branch of Lefkoşa District. In the 1998 election, he was elected to the Assembly of the Republic as a member of the UBP representing the Lefkoşa District. In February 2009, he became the head of the Lefkoşa District organization of the UBP, a post he would occupy until May 2009. He was re-elected in 2003, 2005 and 2009. In 2009, he received 24,776 votes, coming fifth in the UBP in an election where the party won eight MP seats from Lefkoşa. On 4 May 2009, he became the Minister of Public Works and Transport in the eighth Eroğlu cabinet and held his ministerial position until May 2010. During his tenure, the Cyprus Turkish Airlines faced a growing economic crisis, but Taçoy said that he lacked the complete power to fix the problem. He was a candidate for UBP leadership in the extraordinary congress on 5 December 2010, but lost to İrsen Küçük, garnering 212 out of 1414 votes and coming third after Küçük and Ahmet Kaşif. On 27 May 2013, he resigned from the UBP. He joined the Democratic Party on 30 May 2013 and entered the 2013 parliamentary election as a member of the DP. He was re-elected to represent the Lefkoşa District with 11,225 votes. On 14 February 2014, he was elected to the position of Secretary General in the party unopposed. In October 2014, he became the Minister of Public Works and Transport in the Yorgancıoğlu cabinet, a position he occupied until July 2015. During his tenure, he controversially declared that ports would be privatised, with Port of Famagusta being prioritised. On 18 March 2016, he resigned from DP and as of July 2016, he continued his tenure as MP as an independent supporting the UBP-DP coalition Özgürgün cabinet.

Taçoy was one of the chief supporters of the then UBP leader Derviş Eroğlu in his opposition of the Annan Plan for Cyprus. Taçoy believes Turkish Cypriot society to be in moral corruption and believes that religion should play a more prominent role in public life, for which Turkey should take a proactive stance. He has stated that he wants a "society that prays and fasts". He advocates that Northern Cyprus should have no friction with "motherland Turkey", has praised the Justice and Development Party of Turkey and stated that Northern Cyprus should move to an executive presidency.
