= 2026 Northern Cypriot parliamentary election =

- 6 December 2026
- All 50 seats in the Assembly of the Republic; 26 seats needed for a majority
Prime Minister before
Ünal Üstel; UBP

Parliamentary elections are scheduled to be held in Northern Cyprus on 6 December 2026.

== Electoral system ==
The fifty members of the Assembly were elected by proportional representation in six multi-member constituencies with an electoral threshold of 5%. Voters can vote for either a party list or individual candidates. If they choose the latter, they may cast as many votes as there are seats in each constituency. Voters are not limited to their constituency if they wish to vote for individual candidates; they may vote for candidates in any constituency so long as the total number of votes cast is between 24 and 50.

== Background ==
The winner of the previous, 2022 election, Faiz Sucuoğlu resigned on 30 April 2022. President Ersin Tatar appointed Ünal Üstel to replace Sucuoğlu on 9 May, and formed a coalition consisting of his National Unity Party and coalition partners the Democratic Party and the Rebirth Party.
