= 1st Parliament of the Turkish Republic of Northern Cyprus =

This is a list of members of parliament (MPs) elected to the Assembly of the Republic for the 1st Parliament of the Turkish Republic of Northern Cyprus at the 1985 parliamentary election, which was held on 23 June 1985.

The list below indicates the MPs in the parties in which they were elected.

Party	Members	Change	Proportion
National Unity Party	24	▲6	48%
Republican Turkish Party	12	▲7	24%
Communal Liberation Party	10	▼3	20%
New Dawn Party	4	new	8%
Total	50		100%

== Lefkoşa ==
Member of Parliament	Party
Kenan Atakol	National Unity Party
Salih Coşar	National Unity Party
Nazif Borman	National Unity Party
Enver Emin	National Unity Party
Günay Caymaz	National Unity Party
Hakkı Atun	National Unity Party
Vehbi Zeki Serter	National Unity Party
Ahmet Akar	National Unity Party
Altan Yavuz	National Unity Party
Yüksel Tüccaroğlu	National Unity Party
Olgun Paşalar	National Unity Party
Özker Özgür	Republican Turkish Party
Ergün Vehbi	Republican Turkish Party
Mehmet Civa	Republican Turkish Party
Kemal Emirzade	Republican Turkish Party
Hasan Sarıca	Republican Turkish Party
Feridun Önsav	Republican Turkish Party
Mustafa Erbilen	Communal Liberation Party
Alpay Durduran	Communal Liberation Party
Erdal Süreç	Communal Liberation Party
İbrahim Koreli	Communal Liberation Party
Emin Uzun	New Dawn Party

== Gazimağusa ==
Member of Parliament	Party
Mustafa Adaoğlu	National Unity Party
Derviş Eroğlu	National Unity Party
Mehmet Bayram	National Unity Party
Hüseyin Curcioğlu	National Unity Party
Mustafa Karpaslı	National Unity Party
Taşkent Atasayan	National Unity Party
Eşber Serakıncı	National Unity Party
Onay Fadıl Demirciler	National Unity Party
Erbay Kanatlı	National Unity Party
Naci Talat Usar	Republican Turkish Party
Ferdi Sabit Soyer	Republican Turkish Party
Sadık Aktan	Republican Turkish Party
Ergin Abdullah	Republican Turkish Party
Hüseyin Angolemli	Communal Liberation Party
Mehmet Altınay	Communal Liberation Party
İsmail Bozkurt	Communal Liberation Party
Çetin Veziroğlu	Communal Liberation Party
Aytaç Beşeşler	New Dawn Party
Kenan Akın	New Dawn Party
Ömer Demir	New Dawn Party

== Girne ==
Member of Parliament	Party
Mustafa Hacıahmetoğlu	National Unity Party
Tokay Varış	National Unity Party
Sait Güven	National Unity Party
Atay Cafer	National Unity Party
Fadıl Çağda	Republican Turkish Party
Salih Usar	Republican Turkish Party
Ziya Rızkı	Communal Liberation Party
Rasıh Keskiner	Communal Liberation Party
