= 2005 Northern Cypriot presidential election =

- 17 April 2005
- Turnout: 69.58%
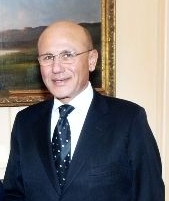

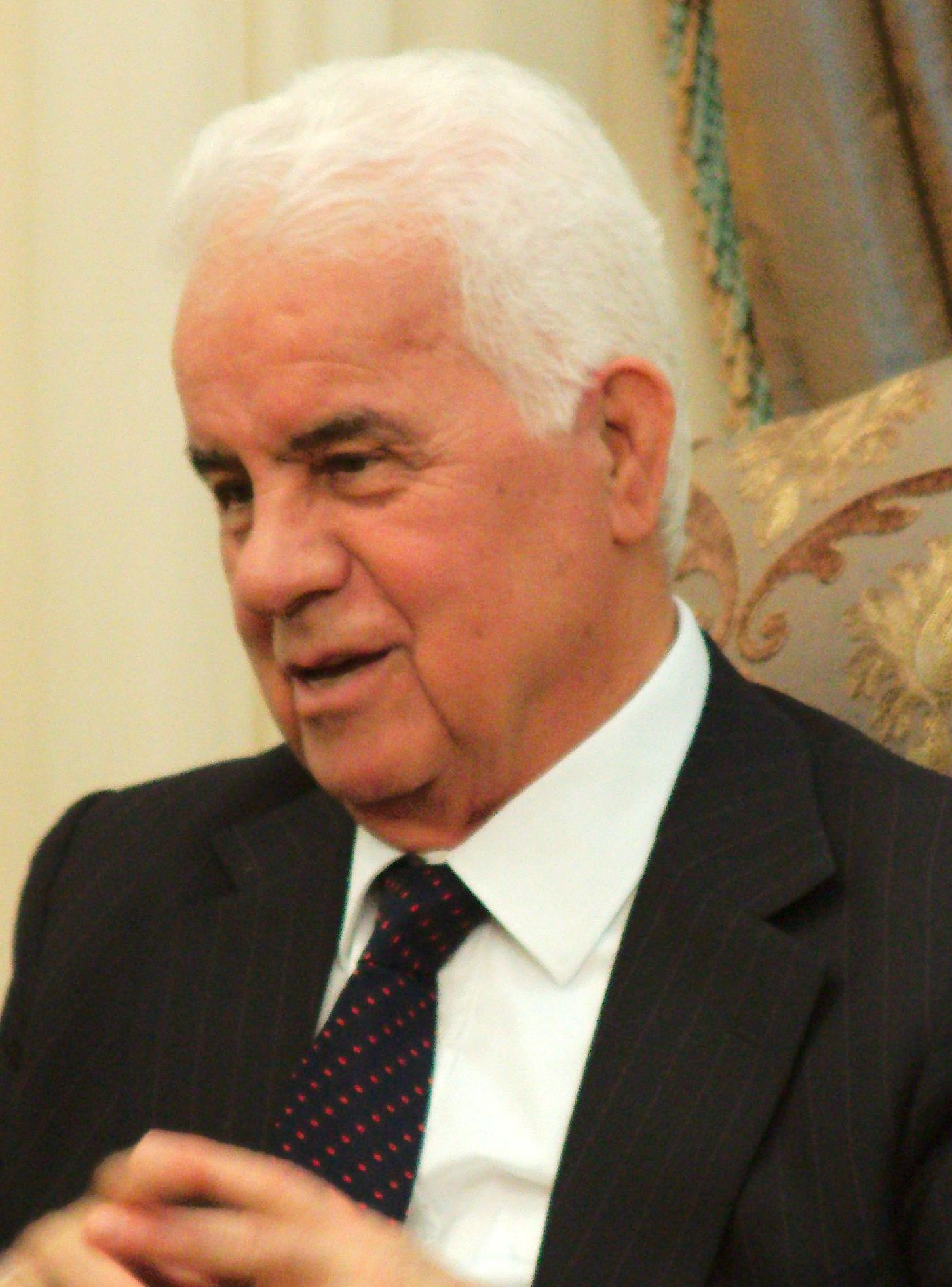
| Candidate | Mehmet Ali Talat | Derviş Eroğlu |
| Party | CTP | UBP |
| Popular vote | 55,945 | 22,874 |
| Percentage | 55.59% | 22.73% |
President before election
Rauf Denktaş
Independent
Elected President
Mehmet Ali Talat
CTP

Presidential elections were held in Northern Cyprus on Sunday 17 April 2005. They followed parliamentary elections on 20 February, which had been won by the pro-unification Republican Turkish Party (CTP).

The CTP nominated its leader, Mehmet Ali Talat, who emerged as the clear winner with a 56% share of the vote. The notable absence in this election was the first and at that point only president of Northern Cyprus, Rauf Denktaş. He had announced in mid-2004 that he would not be running again.

== Electoral system ==
A candidate needed an absolute majority of valid votes in order to win in the first round of voting. If no candidate secured the necessary majority, a second round of voting would have been held between the two top candidates.

== Campaign ==
The election campaign began on 22 March and ended the day before the elections. Under rules set out by the High Electoral Committee, public opinion polls were not allowed be published or broadcast after 2 April.

== Opinion polls ==
A poll had been conducted between 23 and 27 March 2005 by the Cyprus Social Research and Education Consultancy Centre (KADEM). It found that Mehmet Ali Talat would win an absolute majority in the first round. The poll of 1472 people across Northern Cyprus put the results as follows:

- Mehmet Ali Talat - 54.9%
- Derviş Eroğlu - 26.8%
- Mustafa Arabacıoğlu - 8.9%
- Hüseyin Angolemli - 2.5%
- Nuri Çevikel - 1.2%
- Zeki Beşiktepeli - 1.5%
- Ayhan Kaymak - 0.6%
- Arif Salih Kırdağ - 0.4%
- Zehra Cengiz - 0.2%

54% of those polled said the election would be finalised in the first round, while 41% said a second round of voting would be required.

== Results ==
The Turkish Cypriot electoral commission put the turnout at 69.58%, a lower figure than previous presidential elections, which have always been over 80%. It led UBP leader Derviş Eroğlu to question the legitimacy of the elections, pointing to the fact that so many voters had decided not to vote in protest.

| Candidate | Party | Votes | % |
|---|---|---|---|
| Mehmet Ali Talat | Republican Turkish Party | 55,945 | 55.59 |
| Derviş Eroğlu | National Unity Party | 22,874 | 22.73 |
| Mustafa Arabacıoğlu | Democratic Party | 13,302 | 13.22 |
| Nuri Çevikel | New Party | 4,816 | 4.79 |
| Zeki Beşiktepeli | Independent | 1,725 | 1.71 |
| Hüseyin Angolemli | Communal Liberation Party | 1,054 | 1.05 |
| Zehra Cengiz | Cyprus Socialist Party | 439 | 0.44 |
| Arif Salih Kırdağ | Independent | 309 | 0.31 |
| Ayhan Kaymak | Independent | 168 | 0.17 |
| Total | | 100,632 | 100.00 |
| Valid votes | | 100,632 | 97.84 |
| Invalid/blank votes | | 2,221 | 2.16 |
| Total votes | | 102,853 | 100.00 |
| Registered voters/turnout | | 147,823 | 69.58 |
Source: YSK, YSK
