= Gülsen Bozkurt =

Turkish Cypriot doctor and politician

Gülsen Bozkurt (born 28 September 1950) is a Turkish Cypriot doctor and politician. She served as a member of the parliament between 1993 and 2003 and as the Minister of Health and the Environment between 1999 and 2001. She was one of the first Turkish Cypriot women in politics and the second female minister after Onur Borman.

== Early life ==
Gülsen Bozkurt (née Dolmacı) was born in Lapithos on 28 September 1950 as the eldest of the four children of a farmer and a housewife. She started high school at the Kyrenia Anafartalar High School and finished it at the Lefkoşa Türk Lisesi (Nicosia Turkish High School), graduating in 1968. During the intercommunal violence of the 1960s, she and her family had been displaced to North Nicosia, fleeing to the home of her uncle, where they lived.

Bozkurt gained admission to the Faculty of Medicine of Ankara University, from where she graduated in 1974. The 1974 Cypriot coup d'état and the subsequent Turkish invasion of Cyprus occurred when she and her family were in Ankara for her graduation, so they remained stranded there and could only return to the island in August.

== Medical career ==
Whilst Bozkurt had initially wanted to specialise in dermatology, she then changed her mind to choose paediatrics. She went to Ankara in 1976 for her specialisation. After seeing the effects of thalassaemia in Cyprus, she further specialised in paediatric haematology. In 1984, she returned to Cyprus and became one of the founders of the Centre of Thalassaemia in the Dr. Burhan Nalbantoğlu State Hospital. Between 1984 and 1993, she was part of a team that worked successfully to reduce the number of anaemic births in Northern Cyprus, through a screening programme for beta thalassaemia. These included the introduction of prenatal screening through fetal blood tests in 1984 and the implementation of DNA techniques through chorionic villus sampling in 1991.

Meanwhile, Bozkurt continued her further study and work in Britain in 1986–87 on thalassaemia and leukaemia. She further worked on molecular biology in 1993 in the United States. She attended several international conferences and produced conference papers.

She continued her medical practice throughout her political career and beyond, serving as the only paediatric haematologist in Northern Cyprus. She treated adults as well. In 1999, she published a collection of her works her book Thalassemia sendromları ("The Symptoms of Thalassaemia").

== Political career ==
Bozkurt was introduced to politics in 1993 by her brother-in-law, İsmail Bozkurt, a senior figure in the social democratic Communal Liberation Party (TKP). The TKP had recently introduced a women's quote of 15% and was looking for three female candidates for the upcoming general election, which prompted İsmail Bozkurt to approach her. She at first rejected the offer, planning to continue her work on medical matters and apply her newly acquired knowledge. However, upon the insistence of figures from the TKP, she decided to run, not expecting to be elected, being an outsider at the eighth place at the Lefkoşa District. However, having a wide circle of acquaintances as a doctor, she was elected.

This was a time when female participation in Turkish Cypriot politics was a recent phenomenon and she was one of the three female MPs in the parliament, along with Onur Borman of the National Unity Party and Ruhsan Tuğyan of the Democratic Party. She collaborated with to facilitate the passing of the Family Law. In her first term, she served at the Committee for Administrative and Social Matters and prepared a law allowing three months of maternity leave, which was vehemently opposed and rejected.

In the 1998 general election, Bozkurt was re-elected to the parliament. After this election, she became the Minister of Health and Environment in the sixth Eroğlu cabinet, in which the TKP was the junior partner. During her tenure, she had a master plan for healthcare in Northern Cyprus prepared and signed a protocol on healthcare with Turkey. The master plan stipulated a three-level system which consisted of 39 family practice centres at the primary level, hospitals at the secondary level and a faculty of medicine facilitating medical research at the tertiary level. The bulk of the secondary level was to be concentrated at state hospitals, but would be supported by private hospitals. The plan was never implemented. Under Bozkurt, the works to establish a Centre for Diabetes began, the imaging department of the Dr. Burhan Nalbantoğlu State Hospital was improved with the purchase of devices such as an MRI machine, and staff training was intensified. As the Minister of Environment, Bozkurt also had trees planted at the Cumhuriyet Park in Nicosia. When the government fell in June 2001, her term as Minister ended.

On 18 July 2003, Bozkurt resigned from the TKP and joined the newly established Peace and Democracy Movement (BDH). She ran again in the 2003 general election for the BDH but failed to be re-elected.

In the local elections of 2010, Bozkurt ran for the mayoralty of the Nicosia Turkish Municipality. Her campaign was centred on increasing green spaces in Nicosia. In retrospect in 2012, she said that she knew she had no chances of winning but ran anyway to demonstrate her vision for the city and be example for the youth as women rarely run for mayoralty in Northern Cyprus. She lost the election to Cemal Metin Bulutoğluları and came third with 1382 votes, amounting to 7.03%.

She defines herself as a social democrat.

== Personal life ==
Since 16 August 1975, she has been married to Özkan Bozkurt, with whom she met at university, where he was studying engineering. She has two children, her daughter Umut (born on 10 July 1976) and her son Doğuş (born on 19 May 1981).

== Articles ==
- Bozkurt, Gülsen (2007). "Results From The North Cyprus Thalassemia Prevention Program". Hemoglobin: International Journal for Hemoglobin Research. 31 (2): 257–264. doi:10.1080/03630260701297204. PMID 17486509.
- Tilki, Sinan; Dizdarlı, Bülent; Bozkurt, Gülsen; Çelikoyar, M. Mazhar (1998). "Hearing loss with thalassaemic patients". Süleyman Demirel University Journal of the Faculty of Medicine. 5 (1): 39–42.
