= Faiz Sucuoğlu =

Former prime minister of the Turkish Republic of Northern Cyprus

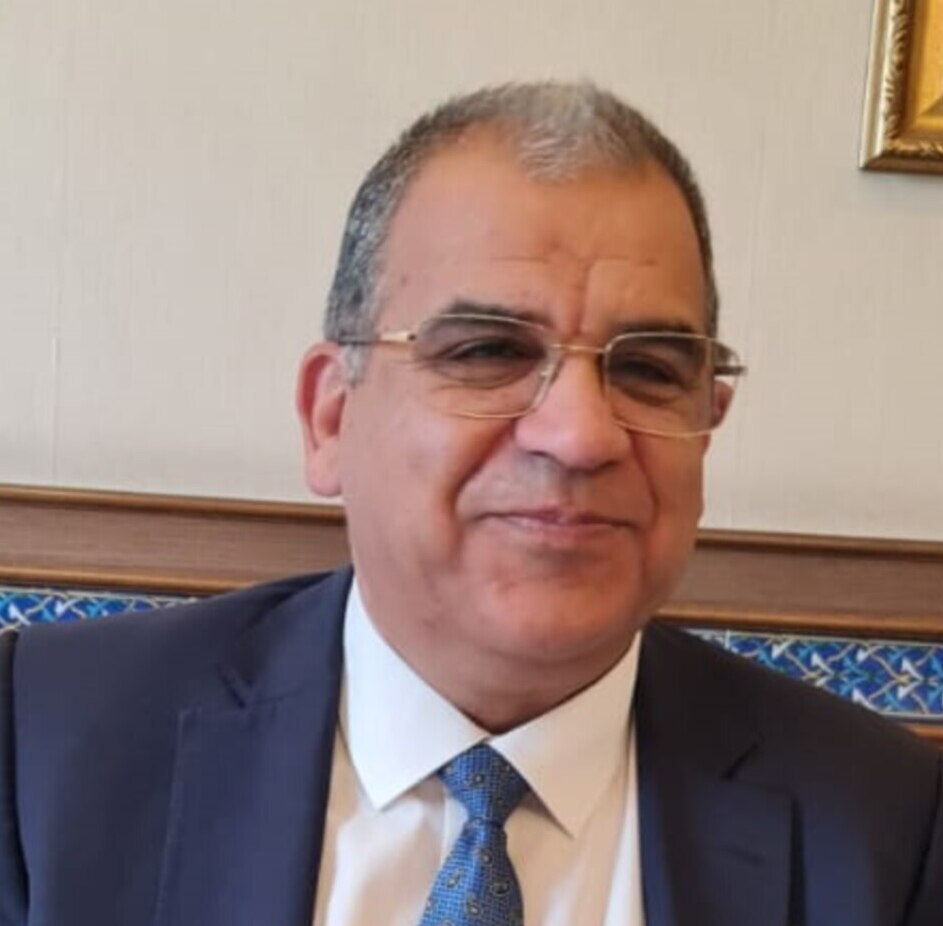
- Faiz Sucuoğlu

Prime Minister of Northern Cyprus
- In office 5 November 2021 – 12 May 2022
- President: Ersin Tatar
- Preceded by: Ersan Saner
- Succeeded by: Ünal Üstel

Leader of the National Unity Party
- In office 31 October 2021 – 1 January 2023
- Preceded by: Ersan Saner
- Succeeded by: Ünal Üstel

Minister of Labour and Social Security
- In office 22 May 2019 – 9 December 2020
- President: Mustafa Akıncı; Ersin Tatar
- Prime Minister: Ersin Tatar
- Preceded by: Zeki Çeler
- Succeeded by: Koral Çağman

Minister of Health
- In office 16 April 2016 – 2 February 2018
- President: Mustafa Akıncı
- Prime Minister: Hüseyin Özgürgün
- Preceded by: Salih İzbul
- Succeeded by: Filiz Besim

Minister of Tourism
- In office 15 July 2015 – 16 April 2016
- President: Mustafa Akıncı
- Prime Minister: Ömer Kalyoncu
- Preceded by: Menteş Gündüz
- Succeeded by: Fikri Ataoğlu

Member of the Assembly of Republic
- In office 28 July 2013 – 23 January 2022
- Constituency: Lefkoşa (2013, 2018)

Personal details
- Born: 27 August 1961 (age 65) Polis, Cyprus
- Party: National Unity Party
- Children: 2
- Education: Istanbul University

Faiz Sucuoğlu (born 27 August 1961) is a Turkish Cypriot politician who was the prime minister of Northern Cyprus from 5 November 2021 to 12 May 2022.

== Biography ==
Sucuoğlu was born in Polis on 27 August 1961. His father, Mehmet Salih Sucuoğlu (died 2018), later served as the Undersecretary of the Ministry of Settlement in Northern Cyprus.

After graduating from the Nicosia Turkish High School (Turkish: Lefkoşa Türk Lisesi), he attained a scholarship from the German government to study medicine in that country. He completed his medical education by studying his final two years at the Istanbul University Çapa Faculty of Medicine. He then specialised in obstetrics and gynaecology at the Zeynep Kamil Hospital in Istanbul, and worked there after the completion of his training until 1993, when he returned to Cyprus. He subsequently served in the military and opened his private clinic, where he worked for 20 years.

== Career ==
He served as the head of the Lefkoşa District section of the National Unity Party between 2011 and 2013. He was elected to parliament, representing Lefkoşa for the UBP, in the 2013 election. He served as the Minister of Tourism in the Kalyoncu cabinet in 2013, and as the Minister of Health in the Özgürgün cabinet in 2016–2017. He was re-elected as an MP in 2018.

He was elected as the leader of the UBP on 31 October 2021, garnering votes of 60.6% of the party members.

=== Premiership ===
Sucuoğlu formed a coalition government with the Democratic Party and became Prime Minister on 5 November 2021.

Political offices
Preceded by Ersan Saner	Prime Minister of Northern Cyprus; 2021–2022	Succeeded by Ünal Üstel
