= 2010 Northern Cypriot presidential election =

- 18 April 2010
- Turnout: 76.37%
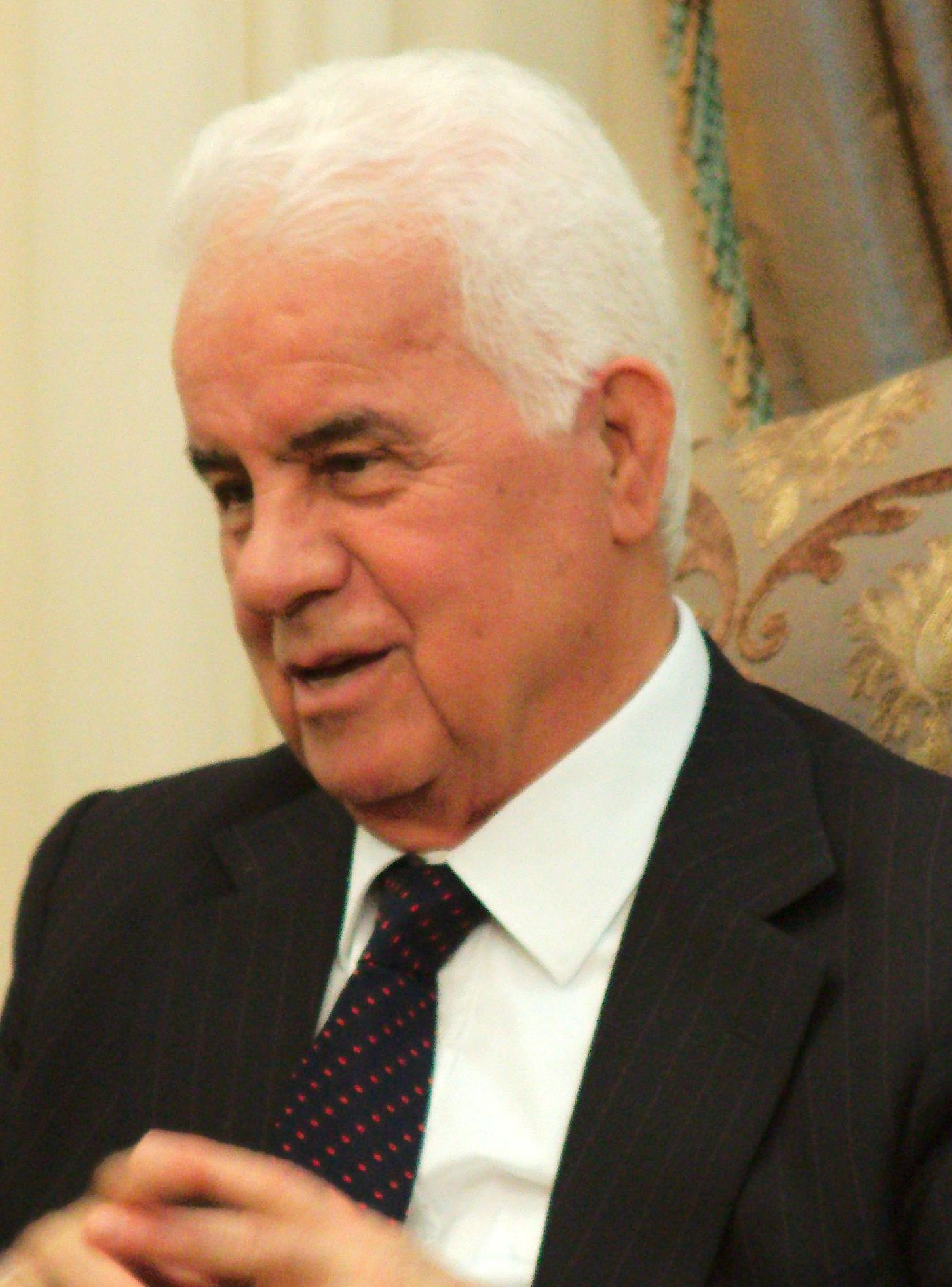

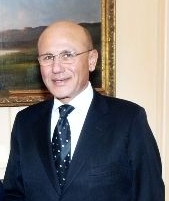
Candidate	Derviş Eroğlu	Mehmet Ali Talat
Party	UBP	Independent
Popular vote	61,422	52,294
Percentage	50.35%	42.87%
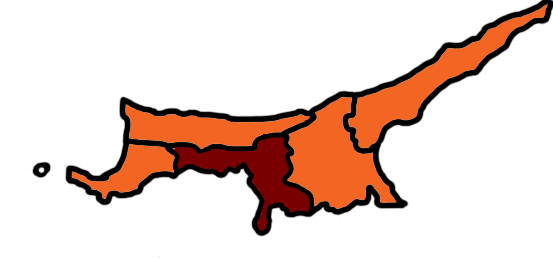
- Map showing the winners by the districts of Northern Cyprus. Orange denotes districts won by Eroğlu, while dark red denotes districts won by Talat.
President before election
Mehmet Ali Talat
CTP
Elected President
Derviş Eroğlu
UBP

Presidential elections were held in Northern Cyprus on 18 April 2010. The result was a victory for Derviş Eroğlu of the National Unity Party, who received 50.38% of the vote in the first round. If no candidate had crossed the 50% threshold, a run-off would have been held on 25 April.

== Background ==
The International Crisis Group stated in an article titled Cyprus: Reunification or Partition?, published on 30 September 2009, that the upcoming elections in April 2010, were of critical importance to the then-ongoing negotiations between Talat and Demetris Christofias to find a solution for the Cyprus dispute. It was stated that the election results could have a defining impact on the future of the island and whether it would be reunited or divided.

== Candidates ==
The two main candidates were the current President Mehmet Ali Talat from the Republican Turkish Party and the incumbent Prime Minister Derviş Eroğlu from the National Unity Party (Ulusal Birlik Partisi, UBP). In the parliamentary election the previous year, the UBP had narrowly obtained enough seats to form a single-party government.

Talat supported the negotiations for a new plan to reunify the island (and had also been in favour of the Annan Plan for Cyprus) whereas his opponent supports a "two-state solution".

The other five candidates (all of them independent) were:

- Mustafa Kemal Tümkan
- Arif Salih Kırdağ
- Zeki Beşiktepeli
- Ayhan Kaymak
- Tahsin Ertuğruloğlu

== Results ==
Turnout was 70%. The count on election night proceeded as follows:

- 20% of the vote counted: Eroğlu at 48.9%, Talat at 43.7%
- 32% of the vote counted: Eroğlu at 48.9%, Talat at 43.3%
- 40% of the vote counted: Eroğlu at 49.2%, Talat at 43.3%
- 48% of the vote counted: Eroğlu at 49.6%, Talat at 43.1%
- 60% of the vote counted: Eroğlu at 49.7%, Talat at 43.0%
- 96% of the vote counted: Eroğlu at 50.3%, Talat at 42.8%

According to final results, Derviş Eroğlu got over 50% of the votes in the first round, meaning a runoff was not necessary.

Candidate	Party	Votes	%
Derviş Eroğlu	National Unity Party	61,422	50.35
Mehmet Ali Talat	Independent	52,294	42.87
Tahsin Ertuğruloğlu	Independent	4,647	3.81
Zeki Beşiktepeli	Independent	1,967	1.61
Mustafa Kemal Tümkan	Independent	964	0.79
Arif Salih Kırdağ	Independent	520	0.43
Ayhan Kaymak	Independent	168	0.14
Total		121,982	100.00
Valid votes		121,982	97.36
Invalid/blank votes		3,312	2.64
Total votes		125,294	100.00
Registered voters/turnout		164,072	76.37
Source: YSK

== Aftermath ==
Derviş Eroğlu of the right-wing National Unity Party (UBP) said that he wanted to continue negotiation on the reunification of Cyprus: "My dream for a solution to the Cyprus problem continues. We will be at the negotiating table for an agreement that will continue the existence of our people in this land with honour."
