= İrsen Küçük =

Prime Minister of Northern Cyprus from 2010 to 2013

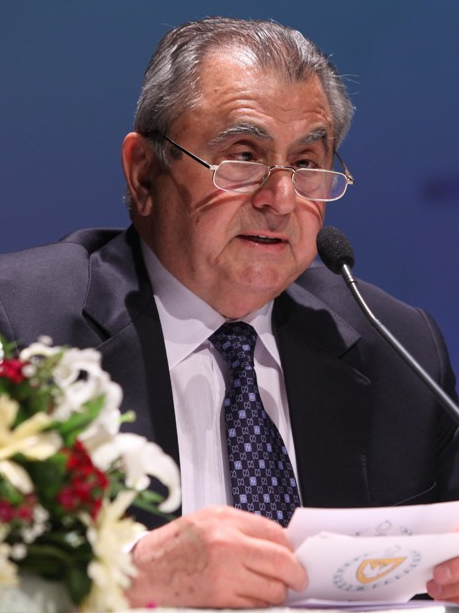

Prime Minister of Northern Cyprus
- In office 17 May 2010 – 13 June 2013
- President: Derviş Eroğlu
- Preceded by: Hüseyin Özgürgün (acting)
- Succeeded by: Sibel Siber

Leader of the National Unity Party
- In office 9 May 2010 – 11 June 2013
- Preceded by: Derviş Eroğlu
- Succeeded by: Hüseyin Özgürgün

Member of the Assembly of Republic
- In office 12 December 1993 – 28 July 2013
- Constituency: Lefkoşa (1993, 1998, 2003, 2005, 2009)
- In office 20 June 1976 – 23 June 1985
- Constituency: Lefkoşa (1976, 1981)

Personal details
- Born: 1940 Nicosia, British Cyprus
- Died: 10 March 2019 (aged 79)
- Party: National Unity Party
- Relatives: Fazıl Küçük (uncle)
- Education: Ankara University

İrsen Küçük (1940 – 10 March 2019) was a Turkish Cypriot politician who was Prime Minister of Northern Cyprus from 2010 to 2013. He was the nephew of the Republic of Cyprus's first vice-president, Fazıl Küçük.

== Early life and education ==
Küçük was born in Nicosia in 1940 and graduated from the Faculty of Agriculture of the Ankara University in 1966, and then started to work at the State Hydraulic Engineering Bureau of Turkey. He got a master's degree in 1969 in irrigations threads. Subsequently, he was industrial engineer at the Veterinary Office of Northern Cyprus between 1968 and 1973, before he became self-employed in the field of agriculture and livestock in the private sector.

== Political career and terms as Prime Minister ==
Shortly thereafter, he joined the National Unity Party (UBP) and was elected in 1976 and 1981 as a representative of Nicosia in the Provisional Parliament.

In July 1976, he was appointed Minister of Agriculture in the first cabinet of Nejat Konuk and exercised this office in the subsequent governments of Osman Örek and Mustafa Çağatay until 1981. He was then Minister of Natural Resources and Energy in the Çağatay government between 1981 and 1982, before being Minister of Health, Social Affairs and Labor in his cabinet from 1982 to 1983.

In December 1983, he was nominated as one of its candidates for the first elections to the first Assembly of the Republic on 23 June 1985. In the elections, he was elected representative and reelected in the early elections in 1993 for the constituency of Nicosia. At the same time he was chairman of the National Unity Party in the district of Nicosia.

After the parliamentary elections of 6 December 1998, he was appointed in the Derviş Eroğlu coalition government and took office of Minister of Agriculture and Forestry and re-appointed in June 2001. After the electoral defeat of the UBP in the parliamentary elections in December 2003, he retired from the government and was instead 2004 Secretary General of the UBP.

The next parliamentary elections on 18 April 2009 were re-won by the UBP, which now had an absolute majority. After the election of Derviş Eroğlu and led by Hüseyin Özgürgün transitional government, he was on 9 May 2010 chairman of the UBP and finally on 17 May 2010 also officially prime minister. On 5 June 2013, he resigned after was ousted by a vote of no confidence in the Assembly. On 13 June 2013, Sibel Siber followed him as prime minister.

On 5 June 2013, he resigned after was ousted by a vote of no confidence in the Assembly. On 13 June 2013, Sibel Siber followed him as prime minister.

He died on 10 March 2019 at the age of 79.

Political offices
Preceded by Hüseyin Özgürgün; Acting	Prime Minister of Northern Cyprus; 2010–2013	Succeeded by Sibel Siber
