= Ahmet Kaşif =

Turkish Cypriot politician

Member of the Assembly of Republic
- In office 6 May 1990 – 7 January 2018
- Constituency: Gazimağusa (1990, 1993, 1998, 2003, 2005, 2009, 2013)

Personal details
- Born: 1950
- Political party: Democratic Party; National Unity Party

Ahmet Kaşif (born 1950) is a Turkish Cypriot politician. He is a member of the Assembly of the Republic from Gazimağusa, and he is a member of the National Unity Party. He has been a member of the Assembly since 1990. He ran for the presidency of his party against İrsen Küçük in 2012. He served as the Minister of Health between 2009 and 2012, until when he was removed from his position by the prime minister Küçük.

He was born in the village of Nergizli in 1950 and studied medicine at the Istanbul University.
