= Denktaş =

Denktaş is a Turkish surname. Notable people with the surname include:

- Rauf Denktaş (1924–2012), President of the Turkish Republic of Cyprus
- Serdar Denktaş (born 1959), Turkish Cypriot politician and son of Rauf Denktaş
