= Özgürgün cabinet =

Özgürgün cabinet was the government of Northern Cyprus between 16 April 2016 and 2 February 2018. It replaced the Kalyoncu cabinet and consisted of 10 ministers formed by a coalition of the National Unity Party (UBP) and Democratic Party (DP-UG). The two parties shared the ministries 7 per 3.

Office	Name	Period	Party
Prime Minister	Hüseyin Özgürgün	16 April 2016–	UBP
Ministry of Foreign Affairs	Tahsin Ertuğruloğlu	16 April 2016–	UBP
Ministry of Interior	Kutlu Evren	16 April 2016–	UBP
Ministry of Agriculture and Natural Resources	Nazım Çavuşoğlu	16 April 2016–	UBP
Minister of Health	Faiz Sucuoğlu	16 April 2016–	UBP
Ministry of Economy and Energy	Sunat Atun	16 April 2016–	UBP
Ministry of Public Works and Transport	Kemal Dürüst	16 April 2016–	UBP
Ministry of Labour and Social Security	Hamza Ersan Saner	16 April 2016–	UBP
Ministry of Finance and Deputy Prime Minister	Serdar Denktaş	16 April 2016–	DP-UG
Ministry of National Education and Culture (ad interim)	Serdar Denktaş	2 November 2017-	DP-UG
Ministry of National Education and Culture	Özdemir Berova	16 April 2016 – 2 November 2017	DP-UG
Ministry of Tourism and Environment	Fikri Ataoğlu	16 April 2016–	DP-UG
