= List of ministers of foreign affairs of Northern Cyprus =

This is a list of ministers of foreign affairs of the Northern Cyprus since the proclamation of the Turkish Federated State of Cyprus in 1976:

Minister	Began	Ended
Vedat Çelik	6 June 1976	21 April 1978
Kenan Atakol	12 December 1978	13 December 1983
Necati Münür Ertekün	13 December 1983	19 June 1985
Kenan Atakol	19 December 1985	31 December 1993
Atay Ahmet Raşit	27 January 1994	16 August 1996
Taner Etkin	16 August 1996	30 December 1998
Tahsin Ertuğruloğlu	31 December 1998	16 January 2004
Serdar Denktaş	16 January 2004	25 September 2006
Turgay Avcı	25 September 2006	4 May 2009
Hüseyin Özgürgün	4 May 2009	13 June 2013
Kutlay Erk	13 June 2013	31 August 2013
Özdil Nami	1 September 2013	12 May 2015
Emine Çolak	12 May 2015	16 April 2016
Tahsin Ertuğruloğlu	16 April 2016	2 February 2018
Kudret Özersay	2 February 2018	9 December 2020
Tahsin Ertuğruloğlu	9 December 2020	21 February 2022
Hasan Taçoy	21 February 2022	9 March 2022
Tahsin Ertuğruloğlu	9 March 2022	present
