= Mehmet Talat =

Mehmet Talat may refer to:

- Mehmet Talaat Pasha, one of the Three Pashas of the Ottoman Empire
- Mehmet Ali Talat, Northern Cypriot politician
