= Özker Özgür =

Turkish-Cypriot politician

Deputy Prime Minister of Northern Cyprus
- In office 1 January 1994 – 11 December 1995
- Prime Minister: Hakkı Atun
- Preceded by: Office re-established
- Succeeded by: Mehmet Ali Talat

Leader of the Republican Turkish Party
- In office 31 October 1976 – 14 January 1996
- Preceded by: Ahmet Mithat Berberoğlu
- Succeeded by: Mehmet Ali Talat

Member of the Assembly of Republic
- In office 20 June 1976 – 6 December 1998
- Constituency: Lefkoşa (1976, 1981, 1985, 1990, 1993)

Personal details
- Born: 11 July 1940 Paphos, Cyprus
- Died: 22 November 2005 (aged 65) Nicosia, Cyprus
- Party: United Cyprus Party; Republican Turkish Party

Özker Özgür (11 July 1940 – 22 November 2005) was a leading Turkish-Cypriot politician. Özgür, whose last name means "free" was born on 11 July 1940 in the village of Vretça, Paphos District, Cyprus. During 1961–1975 he worked as a secondary school English teacher on the island. With the votes of the teachers, he was elected to the founding parliament of the Turkish Federated State of Cyprus in 1975. Between 1976 and 1996 he served as the leader of the Republican Turkish Party CTP in Cyprus. In the early general elections of 1993 he was elected to the Parliament and served as the Deputy Prime Minister and State Minister for North Cyprus.

In 1997 he stepped down as the chairman of the Republican Turkish Party due to internal party politics. He continued his political life as a member of the New Cyprus Party.

Özker Özgür died on 22 November 2005 at the age of 65.
