= Özkan Murat =

Cypriot politician

Özkan Murat (born January 25, 1957, in BAF-TRNC) is a Minister of Interior in the 20th Government of the Turkish Republic of Northern Cyprus (TRNC). Confirmed in April 2005, he holds the Interior Ministry portfolio under Prime Minister Ferdi Sabit Soyer.

Murat graduated from the University of Istanbul School of Law in 1980. He had been the chairman of İKÖK in his education years. He worked as an attorney between 1983 and 1993. He then represented Lefkoşa as a parliamenter (1993–1998).

He had his first chair at the Board of Ministers as Minister of Labour and Social Security and later his second chair as Minister of Agriculture, Natural Sources and Energy. Finally, he became the Minister of Interior for the existing government of TRNC (2007).

Murat is married and has two children.
