= 2009 Northern Cypriot parliamentary election =

← 2005	19 April 2009	2013 →
- All 50 seats in the Assembly of the Republic; 26 seats needed for a majority
- Turnout: 81.68%
Party	Leader	Vote %	Seats	+/–
UBP	Derviş Eroğlu	43.97	26	+7
CTP	Ferdi Sabit Soyer	29.34	15	−9
DP	Serdar Denktaş	10.64	5	−1
TDP	Mehmet Çakıcı	6.87	2	+1
ÖRP	Turgay Avcı	6.20	2	New
This lists parties that won seats. See the complete results below.
Prime Minister before	Prime Minister after
Ferdi Sabit Soyer; CTP	Derviş Eroğlu; UBP

Parliamentary elections were held in Northern Cyprus on 19 April 2009, a year earlier than necessary. The early election was decided upon by the ruling Republican Turkish Party. Winning the largest portion of the vote, the National Unity Party won the election, and the party chairman, Derviş Eroğlu, became prime minister.

171,000 Cypriots were eligible to vote. It has been claimed that of these as many as 100,000 were originally Turkish immigrants.

== Results ==
The National Unity Party (UBP) won the election with 44% of the vote. The Republican Turkish Party (CTP) received 29% of the vote.

Party	Votes	%	Seats	+/–
National Unity Party	622,804	43.97	26	+7
Republican Turkish Party	415,574	29.34	15	–9
Democratic Party	150,695	10.64	5	–1
Communal Democracy Party	97,334	6.87	2	+1
Freedom and Reform Party	87,879	6.20	2	New
United Cyprus Party	34,239	2.42	0	New
Politics for the People Party	7,091	0.50	0	New
Independents	836	0.06	0	0
Total	1,416,452	100.00	50	0
Valid votes	124,293	94.29		
Invalid/blank votes	7,521	5.71		
Total votes	131,814	100.00		
Registered voters/turnout	161,373	81.68		
Source: YSK

== Analysis ==
The UBP's strong anti-unification position means that the results are likely to halt UN efforts to reunify Cyprus. However, the UBP stated after its election victory that it wanted the talks to continue. The UBP remains opposed to a federalist solution, however, and prefers a two-state solution; while analysts have stated that the UBP is unlikely to directly work against the talks, it might shore up resentment and opposition if the talks drag on too long or if it considers the outcome to be unfavourable.

== Reactions ==
Derviş Eroğlu, the UBP chairman and the Prime Minister, stated, "I am proud that Turkey is our main native country. Thanks to our native country we are living calm and safe." In addition, many Turkish Cypriots celebrated the UBP victory. On the other hand, Greek news agency ANA-MPA reported "despair has gripped the Republic of Cyprus" following the release of early election results.

Some analysts say that the new parliament could create difficulties for Mehmet Ali Talat, the peace negotiator for the Turkish Cypriots. With Talat's party gaining slightly fewer seats, "... it is obviously going to limit Talat's ability to act in a lot of ways, you know parliament is going to have a much greater say in all of this and really can tie his hands."
