= 2005 Northern Cypriot parliamentary election =

- 20 February 2005
- 50 seats in the Assembly of the Republic; 26 seats needed for a majority
Party	Leader	Vote %	Seats	+/–
CTP	Mehmet Ali Talat	44.51	24	+5
UBP	Derviş Eroğlu	31.67	19	+1
DP	Serdar Denktaş	13.47	6	−1
BDH	Mustafa Akıncı	5.84	1	−5
This lists parties that won seats. See the complete results below.
Prime Minister before	Prime Minister after
Mehmet Ali Talat; CTP	Mehmet Ali Talat; CTP

Early parliamentary elections were held in Northern Cyprus on 20 February 2005, after the coalition government led by Mehmet Ali Talat lost its majority in the House of Representatives. The vote was a resounding victory for Mehmet Ali Talat's CTP-United Forces alliance, although it fell just short of a majority. The UBP, Democratic Party and BDH also crossed the 5% election threshold and won seats in the House.

== Electoral system ==
The House had 50 members, elected for a five-year term by mitigated proportional representation. Under North Cyprus law, a party had to receive 5% of the total vote to get any seats in parliament.

== Results ==
Party	Votes	%	Seats	+/–
Republican Turkish Party	577,443	44.51	24	+5
National Unity Party	410,813	31.67	19	+1
Democratic Party	174,721	13.47	6	–1
Peace and Democracy Movement	75,747	5.84	1	–5
Communal Liberation Party	31,210	2.41	0	–
New Party	20,832	1.61	0	New
Nationalist Justice Party	6,519	0.50	0	New
Independents	58	0.00	0	New
Total	1,297,343	100.00	50	0
Valid votes	113,639	95.49		
Invalid/blank votes	5,370	4.51		
Total votes	119,009	100.00		
Registered voters/turnout	147,249	80.82		
Source: YSK

== Aftermath ==
Talat became Prime Minister, leading a coalition of the CTP and DP.

=== June 2006 by-election ===
A by-election was held on 25 June 2006 to fill the positions left vacant by the death of Salih Miroğlu (UBP general secretary) and the election of Talat as president. The two parliamentary seats in contention were in Lefkoşa and Kyrenia. This by-election was held together with municipal elections, and the United States Department of State reported that both "were generally free and fair". Of the two vacant seats, one was held by the National Unity Party, the other by the CTP. The two elected candidates were Gülboy Beydağlı and Özkan Yorgancıoğlu, both of which belong to the CTP. The latter thus increased its representation in the Assembly from 24 to 25 seats. The ruling coalition of the CTP and DP had difficulty forming a government after this by-election. When three deputies (two from the National Unity Party and one from the Democratic Party) resigned to form the new, progovernment Freedom and Reform Party in September, the coalition collapsed and Serdar Denktaş quit the government. The CTP then formed a coalition government with the newly formed Freedom and Reform Party, in which it was the biggest partner, holding seven ministries.
