= Ünal Üstel =

Northern Cyprus politician (born 1955)

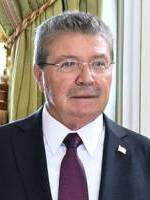

Prime Minister of Northern Cyprus
- Incumbent
- Assumed office 12 May 2022
- President: Ersin Tatar; Tufan Erhürman
- Preceded by: Faiz Sucuoğlu

Leader of the National Unity Party
- Incumbent
- Assumed office 11 September 2022
- Preceded by: Faiz Sucuoğlu

Deputy Speaker of the Assembly of the Republic
- In office 4 September 2013 – 9 October 2015
- Preceded by: Mustafa Yektaoğlu
- Succeeded by: Hüseyin Avkıran Alanlı
- In office 22 June 2001 – 16 January 2004
- Preceded by: Salih Coşar
- Succeeded by: Mehmet Bayram

Member of the Assembly of Republic
- Incumbent
- Assumed office 19 April 2009
- Constituency: Girne (2009, 2013, 2018, 2022)
- In office 13 October 1991 – 20 February 2005
- Constituency: Girne (1991 by-elections, 1993, 1998, 2003)

Personal details
- Born: 1955 (age 70–71) Paphos, Cyprus
- Party: National Unity
- Children: 2
- Education: Istanbul University

Ünal Üstel (born 1955) is a Turkish Cypriot politician who has been the prime minister of Northern Cyprus since 2022, and has served in the Assembly of the Republic since 2009 as a member of the National Unity Party, having also previously served in the Assembly from 1991 to 2005. Prior to his tenure as prime minister he held ministerial positions in multiple governments and was the Deputy Speaker of the assembly from 2001 to 2003, and 2013 to 2015.

== Early life and education ==
Ünal Üstel was born in Paphos, Cyprus, in 1955. He was educated at Baf Kurtuluş High School. He graduated from Istanbul University as a dentist and started a private practice in Cyprus.

== Career ==
In 1991, he was elected to the Assembly of the Republic. In the National Unity Party (UBP), he was Deputy Secretary General from 2006 to 2009. He was the Deputy Speaker of the assembly from 21 June 2001 to 2 October 2003, and from 4 September 2013 to 9 October 2015.

On 6 April 2011, Üstel was appointed to succeed Kemal Dürüst as Minister of Tourism and Environment after Dürüst was appointed as Minister of National Education, Youth, Culture, and Sports. He was Minister of Tourism and Environment in the government formed on 22 May 2019, Minister of Public Works and Transportation in the government formed on 9 December 2020, and Minister of Health from 20 February to 5 November 2021. He was Minister of the Interior under Prime Minister Faiz Sucuoğlu.

Sucuoğlu resigned on 30 April 2022. President Ersin Tatar appointed Üstel to replace Sucuoğlu on 9 May, and formed a coalition consisting of the UBP, Democratic Party, and Rebirth Party.

== Personal life ==
Üstel is the father of two children.

== Works cited ==
=== News ===
- "Başbakan 'dengeledi'". Kıbrıs. 7 April 2011. Archived from the original on 11 October 2011.
- "Kim kimdir?". Star Kıbrıs. 21 April 2009. Archived from the original on 29 June 2025.
- "KKTC'de hükümeti kurma görevi İçişleri Bakanı Üstel'e verildi". Cumhuriyet. 9 May 2022. Archived from the original on 13 May 2022.
- "KKTC'de UBP-DP-YDP koalisyon hükümeti kuruldu". Cumhuriyet. 12 May 2022. Archived from the original on 12 May 2022.

=== Web ===
- "BAŞBAKAN: ÜNAL ÜSTEL". Prime Minister of Northern Cyprus. Archived from the original on 29 June 2025.

Political offices
Preceded by Faiz Sucuoğlu	Prime Minister of Northern Cyprus; 2022	Succeeded by none
