= Hüseyin Öztoprak =

Turkish Cypriot politician

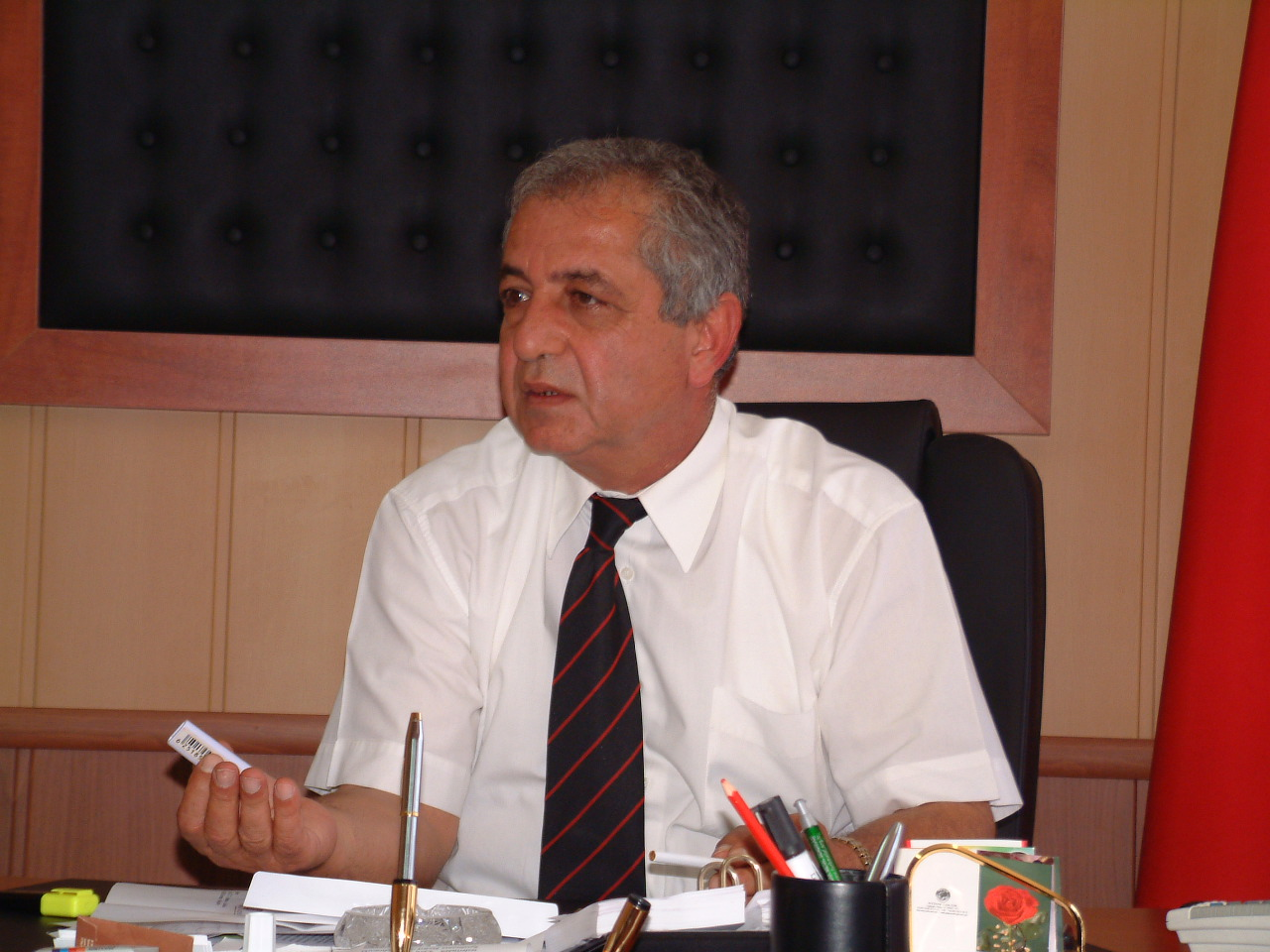
Hüseyin Öztoprak

Hüseyin Öztoprak is the Agriculture and Forestry Minister in the 20th Government of the Turkish Republic of Northern Cyprus under Prime Minister Ferdi Sabit Soyer. He was confirmed in his office in April 2005.
