= Serdar Denktaş =

Turkish Cypriot politician

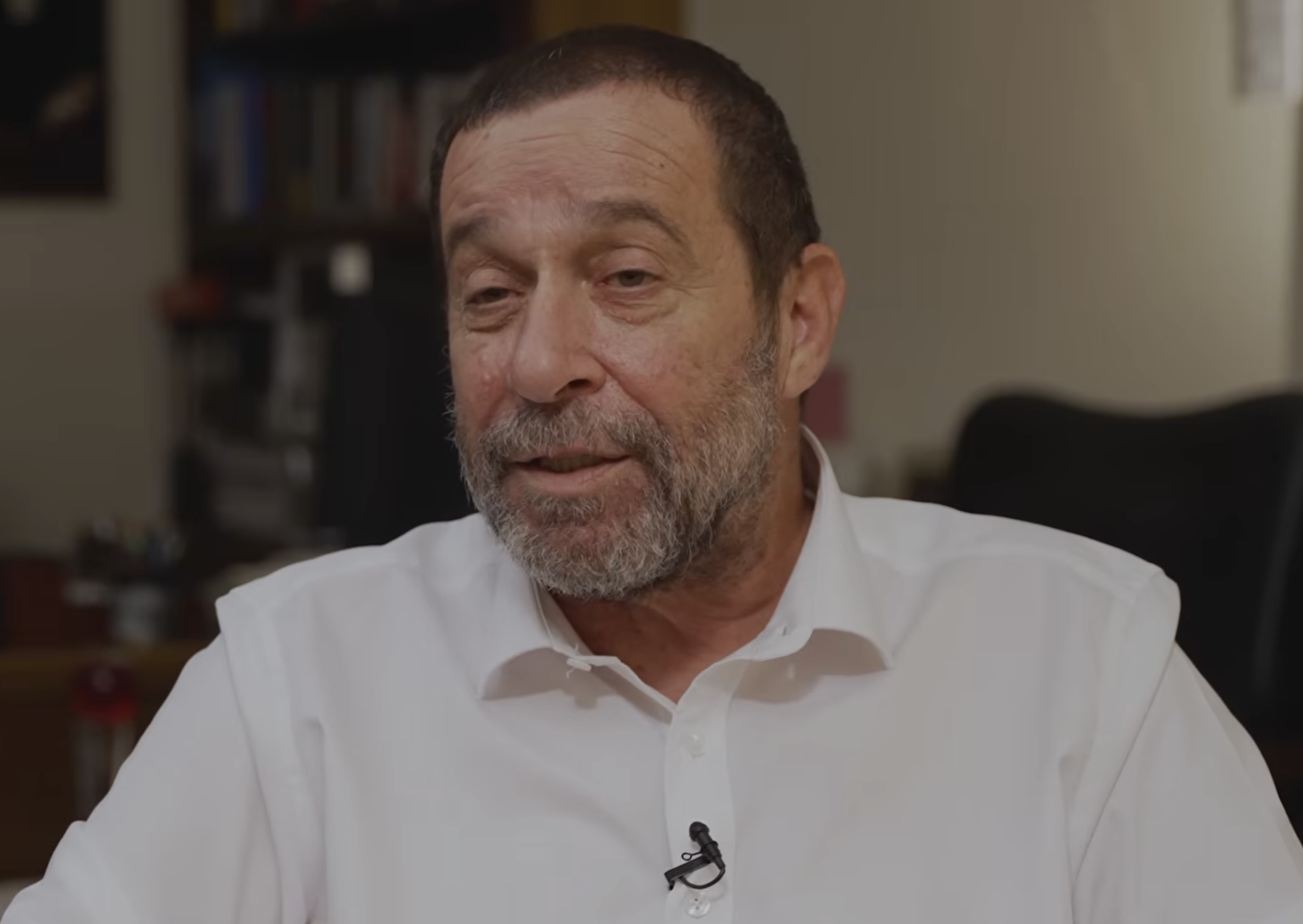

Acting Prime Minister of Northern Cyprus
- In office 23 April 2005 – 26 April 2005
- President: Rauf Denktaş; Mehmet Ali Talat
- Preceded by: Mehmet Ali Talat
- Succeeded by: Ferdi Sabit Soyer

Deputy Prime Minister of Northern Cyprus
- In office 16 April 2016 – 2 February 2018
- Prime Minister: Hüseyin Özgürgün
- Preceded by: Menteş Gündüz (2015)
- Succeeded by: Kudret Özersay
- In office 2 September 2013 – 22 May 2015
- Prime Minister: Özkan Yorgancıoğlu
- Preceded by: Turgay Avcı (2009)
- Succeeded by: Hasan Taçoy (acting)
- In office 28 February 2003 – 25 September 2006
- Prime Minister: Derviş Eroğlu; Mehmet Ali Talat; Himself (acting); Ferdi Sabit Soyer
- Preceded by: Salih Coşar
- Succeeded by: Turgay Avcı
- In office 16 August 1996 – 30 December 1998
- Prime Minister: Derviş Eroğlu
- Preceded by: Mehmet Ali Talat
- Succeeded by: Mustafa Akıncı

Minister of Foreign Affairs
- In office 13 July 2004 – 25 September 2006
- Prime Minister: Mehmet Ali Talat; Himself (acting); Ferdi Sabit Soyer
- Preceded by: Tahsin Ertuğruloğlu
- Succeeded by: Turgay Avcı

Leader of the Democratic Party
- In office December 2002 – 30 November 2019
- Preceded by: Salih Coşar
- Succeeded by: Fikri Ataoğlu
- In office 16 August 1996 – 2000
- Preceded by: Hakkı Atun
- Succeeded by: Salih Coşar

Member of the Assembly of Republic
- In office 6 May 1990 – 23 January 2022
- Constituency: Lefkoşa (1990, 1993, 1998, 2003, 2005, 2009, 2013, 2018)

Personal details
- Born: 1959 (age 66–67)
- Party: Democratic Party
- Parent(s): Rauf Denktaş; Aydın Denktaş

Serdar Denktaş (born 1959) is a Northern Cypriot politician who led the Democratic Party from 1996 to 2000 and from 2002 to 2019, serving as a cabinet minister in numerous governments. He is the son of Rauf Denktaş, the former President of the de facto Turkish Republic of Northern Cyprus.

He was the Minister of Finance of Northern Cyprus from April 2016 to May 2019. His previous portfolios include Labour, Settlement, Foreign Affairs, Economy, Tourism, Sports, Interior, Rural Affairs, Environment, State, Youth, National Education and Culture. He was also an acting Prime Minister from 23 April 2005 to 26 April 2005.

He was born in Nicosia (Turkish: Lefkoşa) in 1959. After completing a course in printing at the London College of Printing in the United Kingdom, he entered University College, Cardiff, to study Economics. However, he did not succeed in completing his studies and returned to Cyprus. He served as the General Manager of the Credit Bank of Cyprus.

In the 1990 General Elections he was elected to the TRNC Parliament as a National Unity Party MP for Nicosia, and served as the Minister of the Interior, Rural Affairs and Environment. He resigned from the NUP in 1992 and took part in the formation of the Democratic Party.

In the 1993 General Elections he was re-elected to his seat as a Democratic Party MP. He served in that government as the Minister of Youth and Sports. He became the leader of the Democratic Party in 1996. He served briefly as Minister of State and Deputy Prime Minister until the formation of a new coalition government.

He was re-elected to the TRNC Parliament at the 1998 General Elections. In 1991, he was appointed Minister of Tourism and Environment. At the general elections in 2003, he was re-elected and appointed as the Deputy Prime Minister and Minister of Foreign Affairs until September 2006, when the Democratic Party was dropped as a coalition partner by the Republican Turkish Party.

He was appointed Deputy Prime Minister and Minister of Finance on 16 April 2016. His term as Deputy Prime Minister ended 2 February 2018. He resigned as Minister of Finance on 8 May 2019.

He speaks Turkish and English. He is viewed as a more pragmatic politician in the Cyprus problem than his father.

== Political titles ==
Serdar Denktaş is known for serving under a large number of titles throughout his political career. The following table lists his governmental and legislative titles.

Title	Start of term	End of term
Member of Parliament	18 May 1990	1 October 1993
Member of Parliament	25 December 1993	23 January 2022
Minister of Finance	16 April 2016	May 2019
Acting Prime Minister	23 April 2005	26 April 2005
Deputy Prime Minister	16 August 1996	30 December 1998
Deputy Prime Minister	28 February 2003	25 September 2006
Deputy Prime Minister	30 August 2013	22 May 2015
Deputy Prime Minister	16 April 2016	2 February 2018
Minister of Interior, Rural Affairs and Environment	20 June 1990	8 May 1992
Minister of Sport, Youth and Environment	1 January 1994	18 January 1995
Minister of State	16 August 1996	30 December 1998
Minister of Labour and Settlement	11 March 1998	26 May 1998
Minister of Tourism and Environment	8 June 2001	28 February 2003
Minister of State Responsible for Tourism	28 February 2003	13 January 2004
Minister of Foreign Affairs	13 January 2004	25 September 2006
Minister of Economy, Tourism, Culture and Sport	30 August 2013	22 May 2015
Minister of National Education	3 October 2014	10 October 2014
Minister of National Education and Culture	2 November 2017	2 February 2018
Leader of Main Opposition	30 December 1998	2000
Leader of Main Opposition	16 July 2015	16 April 2016
