= Zeki Çeler =

Zeki Çeler (born 4 March 1981) is a Turkish Cypriot politician. He was born in Kyrenia, Northern Cyprus. He was the youngest Turkish Cypriot member of the parliament of the TRNC in 2013. He represents the Girne District and is a member of the Communal Democracy Party. He was a minister of Labour and Social Security during the four party coalition between 2018 and 2019. He is well known for making May 1 the Labour Day holiday for all workers in north Cyprus. He joined municipal elections in Kyrenia 2022 as an independent candidate and got 32.5% of the votes against the government party's (33%) and main opposition parties' (34%) candidates. Now he is head of Social Democrats TDP (Toplumcu Demokrasi Partisi).

== 2013 Parliamentary elections in the TRNC ==
At the parliamentary elections which were held on 28 July 2013, Zeki Çeler became the youngest member of parliament in the TRNC.
