= Salih Usar =

Turkish Cypriot politician

Salih Usar is the Minister of Public Works and Communications in the 20th Government of the Turkish Republic of Northern Cyprus, in the cabinet of Prime Minister Ferdi Sabit Soyer. He was appointed to his portfolios in April, 2005.
