= Mustafa Yektaoğlu =

Turkish Cypriot doctor and politician

Mustafa Yektaoğlu (born 1951 in Nicosia, Cyprus) is a Turkish Cypriot doctor and politician. He studied at the Istanbul Faculty of Medicine at Istanbul University graduating in 1978. He later specialised in Germany, where he worked until 1986. After 1988, he wrote a column in the newspaper Yeni Düzen. He served as a member of the board of directors of the Cyprus Turkish Medical Association and the doctors' union Tıp-İş. He was a member of the Assembly of Northern Cyprus between 2005 and 2013 (he was elected twice, in 2005 and 2009) as a member of the Republican Turkish Party representing the Lefkoşa District. He served as the vice-speaker of the assembly between 6 May 2009 and 12 August 2013.

== Educational background ==
- 1962 - Atatürk Primary School Nicosia-Cyprus
- 1965 - Bayraktar Secondary School
- 1969 - Nicosia Turkish High School
- 1978 - Hacettepe Faculty of Medicine-Istanbul Faculty of Medicine
- 1985 - Specialization Germany Urology
