= 2013 Northern Cypriot parliamentary election =

← 2009	28 July 2013	2018 →
- 50 seats in the Assembly of the Republic; 26 seats needed for a majority
Party	Leader	Vote %	Seats	+/–
CTP	Özkan Yorgancıoğlu	38.36	21	+6
UBP	İrsen Küçük	27.32	14	−12
DP	Serdar Denktaş	23.15	12	+7
TDP	Mehmet Çakıcı	7.40	3	+1
This lists parties that won seats. See the complete results below.
Prime Minister before	Prime Minister after
Sibel Siber; CTP	Özkan Yorgancıoğlu; CTP

Parliamentary elections were held in Northern Cyprus on 28 July 2013, a year earlier than necessary. The Republican Turkish Party emerged as the largest in the Assembly of the Republic, winning 21 of the 50 seats.

== Background ==
The government of Prime Minister İrsen Küçük collapsed in May 2013 after eight MPs left his National Unity Party and the government lost a vote of no confidence. On 23 June Sibel Siber became interim prime minister, forming a government consisting of the Republican Turkish Party, the Democratic Party and the Communal Democracy Party. The new government was approved by a vote of 26–11 in the Assembly.

== Electoral system ==
The fifty members of the Assembly were elected by proportional representation in five multi-member constituencies with an electoral threshold of 5%. Voters could either vote for a party list or for individual candidates. If they chose the latter, they could cast as many votes as there were seats in a constituency.

== Campaign ==
Five parties with 250 candidates registered to contest the election, as well as seven independents.

Though election campaigns in Northern Cypriot elections are usually related to the Cyprus dispute, this main focus of the 2013 elections concerns about the National Unity Party's Turkish-backed economic programmes and austerity.

== Results ==
Party	Votes	%	Seats	+/–
Republican Turkish Party	477,209	38.36	21	+6
National Unity Party	339,864	27.32	14	–12
Democratic Party	288,021	23.15	12	+7
Communal Democracy Party	92,110	7.40	3	+1
United Cyprus Party	39,827	3.20	0	0
Independents	7,110	0.57	0	0
Total	1,244,141	100.00	50	0
Valid votes	111,920	93.31		
Invalid/blank votes	8,020	6.69		
Total votes	119,940	100.00		
Registered voters/turnout	172,803	69.41		
Source: YSK
