= Mehmet Ali Talat =

President of Northern Cyprus from 2005 to 2010

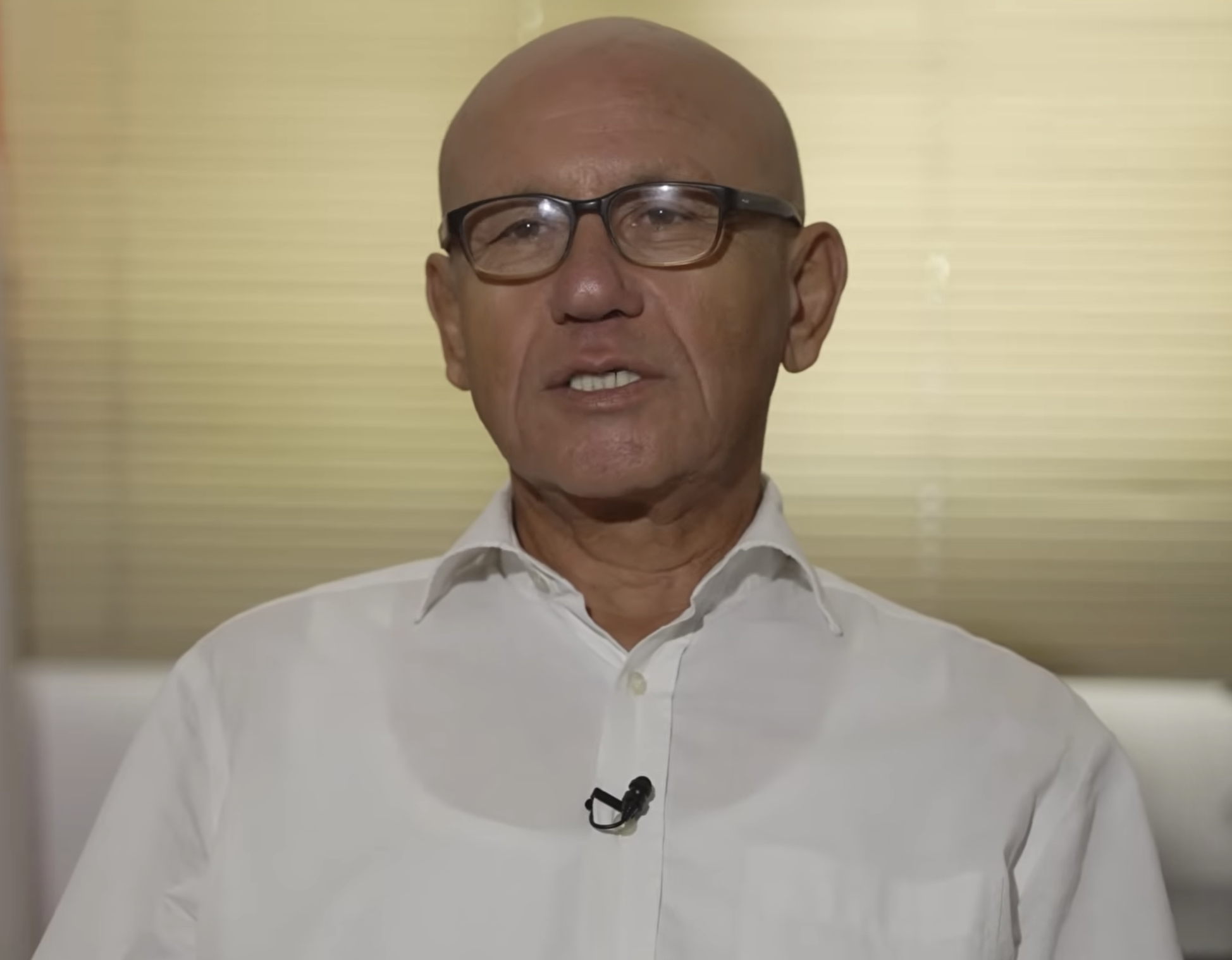

2nd President of Northern Cyprus
- In office 24 April 2005 – 23 April 2010
- Prime Minister: Ferdi Sabit Soyer; Derviş Eroğlu
- Preceded by: Rauf Denktaş
- Succeeded by: Derviş Eroğlu

Prime Minister of Northern Cyprus
- In office 13 January 2004 – 23 April 2005
- President: Rauf Denktaş
- Preceded by: Derviş Eroğlu
- Succeeded by: Serdar Denktaş (acting)

Deputy Prime Minister of Northern Cyprus
- In office 11 December 1995 – 16 August 1996
- Prime Minister: Hakkı Atun
- Preceded by: Özker Özgür
- Succeeded by: Serdar Denktaş

Leader of the Republican Turkish Party
- In office 14 June 2015 – 13 November 2016
- Preceded by: Özkan Yorgancıoğlu
- Succeeded by: Tufan Erhürman
- In office 14 January 1996 – 24 April 2005
- Preceded by: Özker Özgür
- Succeeded by: Ferdi Sabit Soyer

Member of the Assembly of Republic
- In office 6 December 1998 – 23 April 2005
- Constituency: Lefkoşa (1998, 2003, 2005)

Personal details
- Born: 6 July 1952 (age 74) Kyrenia, British Cyprus
- Party: Republican Turkish Party
- Spouse: Oya Talat
- Children: 2
- Education: Middle East Technical University (BS); Eastern Mediterranean University (MA)

Mehmet Ali Talat (born 6 July 1952) is a Turkish Cypriot politician who served as the president of Northern Cyprus from 2005 to 2010. Talat was the leader of the social democratic Republican Turkish Party (Turkish: Cumhuriyetçi Türk Partisi, CTP), from 1996 to 2005 and 2015 to 2016. He became prime minister in 2004, and subsequently won the presidential election held on 17 April 2005. Talat was inaugurated on 25 April 2005, succeeding retiring leader Rauf Denktaş. He lost the presidential election of 2010 and was replaced by Derviş Eroğlu as President.

== Early life ==
Talat was born in Kyrenia on 6 July 1952. Completing his secondary education in Cyprus, Talat graduated from Electrical and Electronics Engineering Department of the Middle East Technical University (METU) in Ankara, Turkey.

Involved in various political activities since he was a university student, Talat continued after he returned to Cyprus, and played an important role in the establishment of Turkish Cypriot trade unions and the Turkish Cypriot Students' Youth Federation (KOGEF), becoming the first chairman of its executive board.

He also participated in the youth movement of the Republican Turkish Party, and served in various committees and organs of the CTP for many years. He served as the party secretary for Education.

== Political career ==
=== Early political career and party leadership ===
Talat joined the CTP in 1973 and soon rose to the party leadership. He worked as a refrigerator repairman during this time. He was a senior figure in the party when the independence of Northern Cyprus was declared in 1983. The CTP had opposed the creation of an independent state in the north previously, distributing anti-independence pamphlets days before the declaration. However, according to Talat, the party had been threatened by Denktaş to prevent them from voting against the declaration. Talat was one of those against voting for in the internal party debate, but the party leadership narrowly decided to vote for independence. Talat later controversially stated that he had cried after this meeting.

Talat was the Minister of Education and Culture in the first coalition government formed by the CTP-Democratic Party (DP) Alliance after the general elections of December 1993. He undertook the same post in the second DP-CTP coalition government, and became the Minister of State and Deputy Prime Minister in the third DP-CTP coalition government.

Talat was elected as the leader of the CTP on 14 January 1996, succeeding Özker Özgür. After being elected to the TRNC parliament on 14 December 2003, Talat formed another CTP-DP coalition government on 13 January 2004, at the behest of the then-TRNC President Rauf Denktaş, when the incumbent Prime minister Derviş Eroğlu was unable to do so.

=== Presidency ===
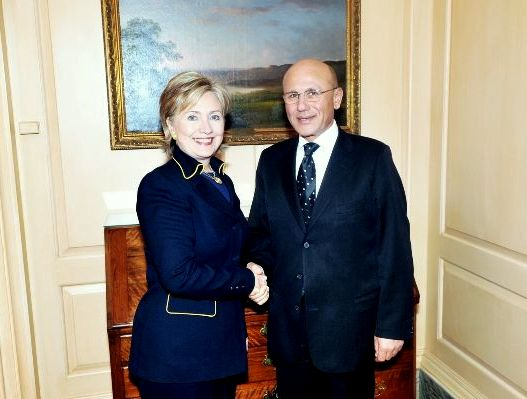
Talat meets with U.S. Secretary of State Hillary Clinton in Washington, D.C. on 15 April 2009.

Winning a victory in the 20 February 2005 general elections, Talat formed the second CTP-DP coalition, serving as Prime Minister until his election as the second TRNC President on 17 April 2005, when he asked CTP Deputy Leader Ferdi Sabit Soyer to form a new government. As part of his cabinet, he appointed Raşit Pertev as Chief Negotiator for the United Nations Peace Talks.

During the 2004 referendum on the Annan Plan to extinguish the Republic of Cyprus through the formation of a loose confederation along ethnic division in advance of its entry to the European Union, Talat promoted a 'Yes' vote among Turkish Cypriots and the plan received overwhelming endorsement north of the Green Line. However, Tassos Papadopoulos, the then President of the Republic of Cyprus, opposed the plan and the Greek Cypriot community rejected it by a large majority opting for an as yet undefined constitution along the EU norms principles such as universal suffrage. As a consequence, the plan was dropped, but the EU declared it would seek to implement trade concessions and other measures designed to alleviate the isolation of Northern Cyprus as a reward for the Turkish Cypriot referendum result. Talat remained publicly committed to reunification. However the pro-solutionist side and Mehmet Al Talat lost momentum, because of the ongoing embargo and isolation, despite promises from the European Union of easing them, which did not occur, and as a result the Turkish Cypriot electorate became frustrated. This led ultimately to the pro-independence side winning the general elections in 2009 and its candidate, former Prime Minister Derviş Eroğlu winning the presidential elections in 2010. Although his side and he himself disagrees with and opposes re-unification with the Republic of Cyprus, and favours the unity of and close relations between northern Cyprus and Turkey and supports the independence of the former, he nevertheless is negotiating with the Greek Cypriot side towards a settlement for reunification, to establish a bi-communal, bi-zonal federation in Cyprus, based on the political equality of the two communities, single sovereignty, single citizenship and international identity.

=== Return to politics ===
On 14 June 2015, Talat won the congress of the CTP and became the leader of the party again. Under his leadership, the Yorgancıoğlu cabinet resigned and was replaced by a cabinet headed by Ömer Kalyoncu, in a grand coalition with the National Unity Party (UBP). Talat was sometimes dubbed as the "shadow leader" of the cabinet, though he refused this designation. The government fell due to the UBP's withdrawal after friction with Turkey on the economic protocol to be signed between the two states and the question of the management of the Northern Cyprus Water Supply Project. Talat then became the leader of the main opposition as UBP and DP formed a government. On 22 May 2016, he announced that he would not be a candidate for the party's leadership in the next congress, due in November 2016.

== Personal life ==
Mehmet Ali Talat is married to Oya Talat, a chemist and women's rights activist. The couple got married on 29 October 1978. They have a daughter and a son.

Political offices
Preceded by Derviş Eroğlu	Prime Minister of Northern Cyprus; 2004–2005	Succeeded by Ferdi Sabit Soyer
Preceded by Rauf Denktaş	President of Northern Cyprus; 2005–2010	Succeeded by Derviş Eroğlu
