= 1998 Northern Cypriot parliamentary election =

| ← 1993 | 6 December 1998 | 2003 → |
- All 50 seats in the Assembly of the Republic; 26 seats needed for a majority
| Party | Leader | Vote % | Seats | +/– |
|---|---|---|---|---|
| UBP | Derviş Eroğlu | 40.39 | 24 | +8 |
| DP | Serdar Denktaş | 22.60 | 13 | −3 |
| TKP | Alpay Durduran | 15.32 | 7 | +2 |
| CTP | Mehmet Ali Talat | 13.37 | 6 | −7 |
This lists parties that won seats. See the complete results below.
| Prime Minister before | Prime Minister after |
|---|---|
| Derviş Eroğlu; UBP | Derviş Eroğlu; UBP |

Parliamentary elections were held in Northern Cyprus on 6 December 1998. The National Unity Party emerged as the largest party in the Assembly of the Republic, winning 24 of the 50 seats.

== Electoral system ==
At the time of the election, Northern Cyprus was divided into five constituencies, electing a total of 50 members of the Assembly by proportional representation. Voters could cast as many votes in their district as there were seats.

== Results ==
| Party | Votes | % | Seats | +/– |
|---|---|---|---|---|
| National Unity Party | 440,626 | 40.39 | 24 | +8 |
| Democratic Party | 246,602 | 22.60 | 13 | –3 |
| Communal Liberation Party | 167,123 | 15.32 | 7 | +2 |
| Republican Turkish Party | 145,874 | 13.37 | 6 | –7 |
| National Rebirth Party | 49,511 | 4.54 | 0 | New |
| Patriotic Peace Movement | 27,467 | 2.52 | 0 | 0 |
| Our Party | 13,487 | 1.24 | 0 | New |
| Independents | 296 | 0.03 | 0 | 0 |
| Total | 1,090,986 | 100.00 | 50 | 0 |
| Valid votes | 99,568 | 93.64 | | |
| Invalid/blank votes | 6,763 | 6.36 | | |
| Total votes | 106,331 | 100.00 | | |
| Registered voters/turnout | 120,758 | 88.05 | | |
Source: YSK
