= Ömer Kalyoncu =

10th prime minister of Northern Cyprus

Prime Minister of Northern Cyprus
- In office 16 July 2015 – 16 April 2016
- President: Mustafa Akıncı
- Preceded by: Özkan Yorgancıoğlu
- Succeeded by: Hüseyin Özgürgün

Personal details
- Born: October 16, 1950 (age 75) Kyrenia, Cyprus
- Party: Republican Turkish Party
- Education: Middle East Technical; University

Ömer Soyer Kalyoncu (born 16 October 1950) is a Turkish Cypriot politician who was the Prime Minister of Northern Cyprus between 16 July 2015 and April 2016.

Kalyoncu was born in Kyrenia in 1950. He studied chemical engineering in the Middle East Technical University, and took part in student associations during his student life. Upon his return to Cyprus, he became first an administrator, then the leader of the Association of Revolutionary Youth.

He became a member of the Republican Turkish Party (CTP) in 1973, and rose to high positions, including the membership of the Central Administrative Board (Turkish: Merkez Yönetim Kurulu, MYK). He was first elected to the Assembly of the Republic from the Girne District in the parliamentary election of 1993. He was the Minister of Labor and Social Security between 11 December 1995 and 16 August 1996. He was re-elected to the parliament in parliamentary election of 1998 and parliamentary election of 2003 and subsequently became the Minister of Public Works and Transportation in the CTP-DP coalition till 2005.

In 2011, Kalyoncu ran for the leadership of the party. In an election in the party congress against Özkan Yorgancıoğlu and Mehmet Çağlar, he came second and the election was scheduled to have a run-off between him and Yorgancıoğlu. However, Kalyoncu withdrew as he had previously announced, and Yorgancıoğlu became the leader.

In June 2015, after Mehmet Ali Talat assumed leadership of the CTP, the cabinet under former party leader Özkan Yorgancıoğlu fell. Kalyoncu was tasked with forming the new government. On 9 July 2015, it was announced that the government would be formed with the National Unity Party.

Political offices
Preceded by Özkan Yorgancıoğlu	Prime Minister of Northern Cyprus; 2015–2016	Succeeded by Hüseyin Özgürgün
