= 2003 Northern Cypriot parliamentary election =

- 15 December 2003
- 50 seats in the Assembly of the Republic; 26 seats needed for a majority
Party	Leader	Vote %	Seats	+/–
CTP	Mehmet Ali Talat	35.2	19	+13
UBP	Derviş Eroğlu	32.9	18	−6
DP	Serdar Denktaş	12.9	7	−6
BDH	Mustafa Akıncı	13.1	6	New
This lists parties that won seats. See the complete results below.
Prime Minister before	Prime Minister after
Derviş Eroğlu; UBP	Mehmet Ali Talat; CTP

Parliamentary elections were held in Northern Cyprus on 15 December 2003. Having come fourth in the 1998 elections, the Republican Turkish Party emerged as the largest party in the Assembly of the Republic, winning 19 of the 50 seats.

== Electoral system ==
Northern Cyprus is divided into five constituencies, electing a total of 50 members of the Assembly by proportional representation. Voters can cast as many votes in their district as there are seats.

== Results ==
Party	Votes	%	Seats	+/–
Republican Turkish Party	469,323	35.17	19	+13
National Unity Party	439,203	32.91	18	–6
Democratic Party	172,650	12.94	7	–6
Peace and Democracy Movement	175,981	13.19	6	New
Nationalist Peace Party	42,807	3.21	0	New
Solution and EU Party	26,439	1.98	0	New
Cyprus Justice Party	8,045	0.60	0	New
Independents	173	0.01	0	0
Total	1,334,621	100.00	50	0
Valid votes	115,823	95.14		
Invalid/blank votes	5,917	4.86		
Total votes	121,740	100.00		
Registered voters/turnout	141,596	85.98		
Source: YSK

== Aftermath ==
Under the Turkish Cypriot constitution, the members of the new parliament must gather to be sworn in 10 days after the results are officially published. Soon after this first session, President Rauf Denktaş had to decide whom to ask building a government. As a result he asked Mehmet Ali Talat of the Republican Turkish Party (CTP) to form the next government. Talat had 15 days to establish a coalition government. It was hard for him to build a government. The two blocs in the parliament, the "pro Annan plan" bloc and the "status quo" bloc, each had 25 seats in parliament. The National Unity Party refused Talat's offer to build a government together, and as a result the only way to build a government for Talat was to get the Democratic Party (DP) to join his government. After some unsuccessful talks, the DP agreed to build a coalition with the CTP. As a result a coalition relying on a narrow majority of 26 out of 50 seats was built.
