= Ferdi Sabit Soyer =

Prime Minister of Northern Cyprus
- In office 26 April 2005 – 5 May 2009
- President: Mehmet Ali Talat
- Preceded by: Serdar Denktaş (acting)
- Succeeded by: Derviş Eroğlu

Leader of the Republican Turkish Party
- In office 21 May 2005 – 5 June 2011
- Preceded by: Mehmet Ali Talat
- Succeeded by: Özkan Yorgancıoğlu

Member of the Assembly of Republic
- In office 12 December 1993 – 7 January 2018
- Constituency: Gazimağusa (1993, 1998, 2003, 2005, 2009, 2013)
- In office 23 June 1985 – 6 May 1990
- Constituency: Gazimağusa (1985)

Personal details
- Born: 5 March 1952 (age 74) Nicosia, British Cyprus
- Party: Republican Turkish Party
- Children: 2

Ferdi Sabit Soyer (/ˈfɛərdi ˈsɑːbɪt ˈsɔɪ.ər/; born 5 March 1952) is a former Prime Minister of the Turkish Republic of Northern Cyprus, and former Leader of Republican Turkish Party (CTP).

Soyer, a former union leader, has been a member of the TRNC parliament from 1985 (except for a three-year absence between 1990 and 1993) until his retirement in 2018. He was named successor to Talat's former post of TRNC Prime Minister on 25 April 2005.

Soyer was born in Nicosia in 1952, attending secondary school in Cyprus, then continued towards a degree in medicine from Turkey. However, due to political reasons he did not complete his university education. While there, Soyer co-founded the Youth Federation of Turkish Cypriot Students (KOGEF) and he was also its leader for a time.

Upon returning to Cyprus, Soyer continued to take an active part in various Turkish-Cypriot political movements. He worked as a member of Republican Turkish Party for a long time, recently holding the party office of secretary-general.

TRNC Cabinet offices that Soyer held was Minister of Agriculture, Natural Resources and Energy in the 1993 DP-CTP coalition government.

Soyer was elected as the new Chairman of the Republican Turkish Party on 21 May 2005, replacing President Talat who vacated his position after taking over the presidency.

Soyer is married with two children.

Political offices
Preceded by Mehmet Ali Talat	Prime Minister of the Turkish Republic of Northern Cyprus; 2005–2009	Succeeded by Derviş Eroğlu
