= Turgay Avcı =

Cypriot politician

Turgay Avcı is the deputy prime minister and minister of Foreign Affairs in the government of the Turkish Republic of Northern Cyprus. He was the Leader of the former Reform Party (Northern Cyprus).

== Biography ==
Avcı was born in Larnaca in 1959. After graduating from Famagusta Namık Kemal High School, he studied Electrical and Electronics Engineering at American University of Beirut, graduating in 1985. He received his master's degree in Business Administration at the Eastern Mediterranean University (EMU) in 1992 and has a doctorate from Çukurova University in Administration and Organization.

He attended trainings in the US and Germany in the fields of tourism, administration and quality.

He was a Member of North Cyprus Atatürk Research and Implementation Centre and Member of the State Television (BRT) Board. In the public sector, he served as a Member of the Advisory Council, Specialization Commission, Tourism Master Plan Working Committee, Tourism Advisory Committee, and Human Resource and Education Committee. In the 14 December 2003 General Elections and later in the 20 February 2005 early elections he was elected to the Parliament as National Unity Party's Famagusta MP. After serving as the Secretary General of the National Unity Party, he resigned from his party and formed the Freedom and Reform Party. He took part in the Republican Turkish Party-United Forces and Freedom and Reform Party coalition government, which was formed on 25 September 2006, as the Deputy Prime Minister and Minister of Foreign Affairs.

As Minister of Foreign Affairs, Turgay Avci worked on embargoes while also beginning direct ship tours and the normalization of relations with Syria.

As the president of higher education institutions, Audit, Accreditation and Coordination Board (YÖDAK), Turgay Avci was arrested for collecting bribe. He resigned from his post at the request of Ersin Tatar, the Northern Cyprus President
