= Sonay Adem =

Turkish Cypriot politician (1957–2018)

Sonay Adem (1957, in Paphos – 29 October 2018) was a Turkish Cypriot politician. He served as the Minister for Labor and Social Security in the Cabinet of Northern Cyprus under Prime Minister Ferdi Sabit Soyer. He was confirmed in his office (in the 20th TRNC Government) in April 2005 and served until 2009. He was a member of the Republican Turkish Party until his resignation, after which he joined the Communal Liberation Party-New Forces in January 2017. He has done extensive work on curbing illegal immigration to the island, as well as immigration reform, in conjunction with organisations such as the Union of Construction Sector Contractors.
