= Özkan Yorgancıoğlu =

9th prime minister of Northern Cyprus

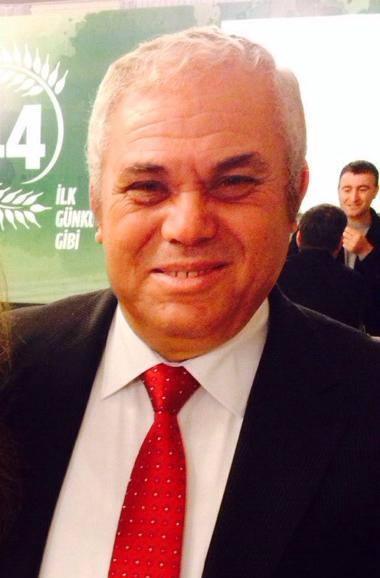

Prime Minister of Northern Cyprus
- In office 2 September 2013 – 16 July 2015
- President: Derviş Eroğlu; Mustafa Akıncı
- Preceded by: Sibel Siber
- Succeeded by: Ömer Kalyoncu

Personal details
- Born: 1 August 1954 (age 72) Lempa, British Cyprus
- Party: Republican Turkish Party
- Education: Istanbul University

Özkan Yorgancıoğlu (born 1 August 1954) is a Turkish Cypriot politician who has been Prime Minister of Northern Cyprus (TRNC) between 2 September 2013 and 16 July 2015. He was also the leader of the Republican Turkish Party.

== Early life and education ==
Yorgancıoğlu was born in 1954 in Lempa, a village in Paphos, the westernmost district of Cyprus, which was, at the time, a British crown colony. He studied at Istanbul University's Department of Economics and Public Finance, receiving his degree in political science in 1980.

== Political career ==
On 28 April 2005, Yorgancıoğlu was appointed Minister of Youth and Sports in the cabinet of TRNC Prime Minister (PM) Ferdi Sabit Soyer, who served from April 2005 to May 2009. In 2011, he replaced Soyer as Chairman of the Republican Turkish Party. After his party won the July 2013 legislative election, he became PM, replacing interim PM Sibel Siber on 2 September.

Political offices
Preceded by Sibel Siber	Prime Minister of Northern Cyprus; 2013–2015	Succeeded by Ömer Kalyoncu
