= Derviş Eroğlu =

President of Northern Cyprus, 2010–2015

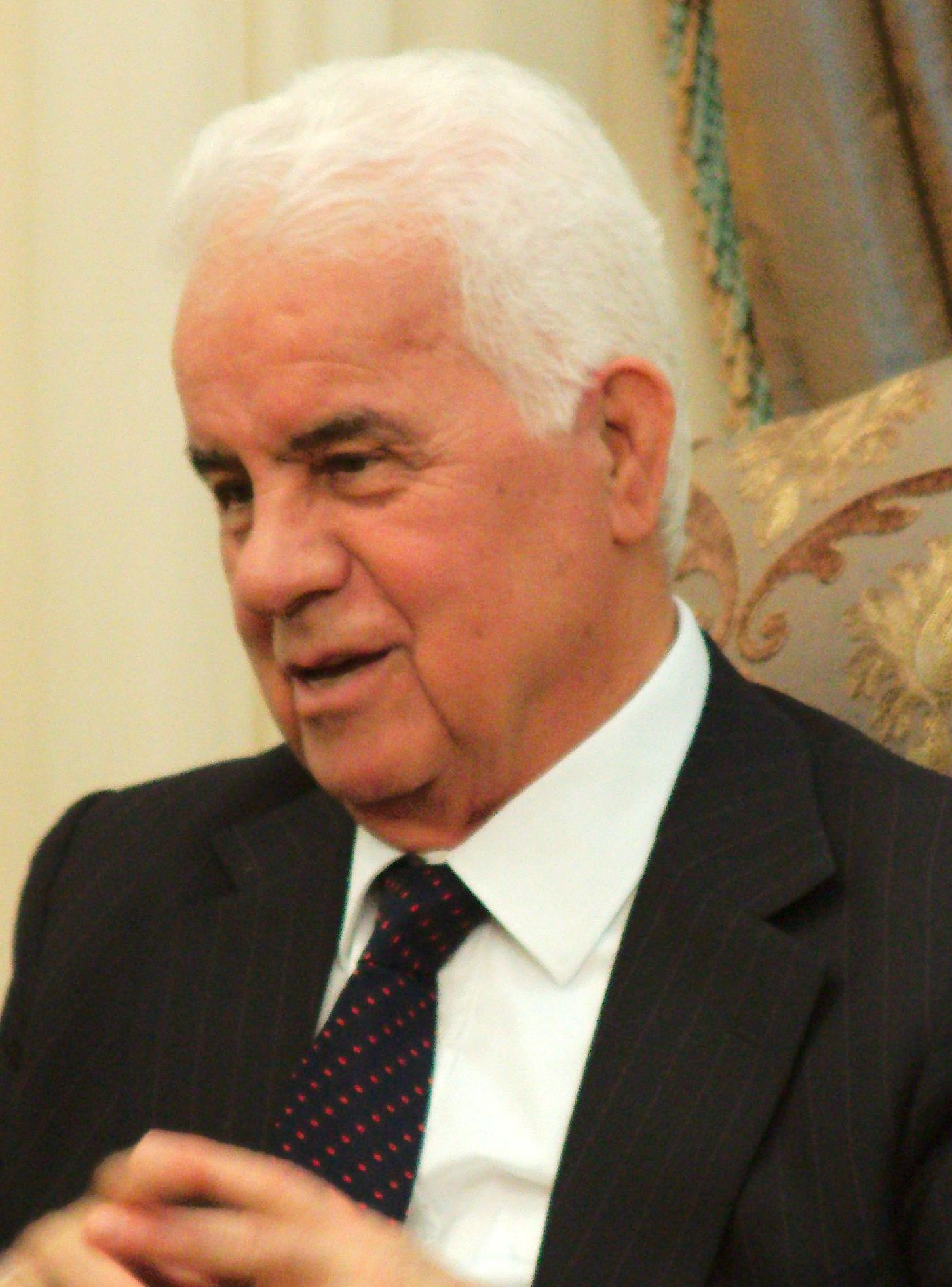

3rd President of Northern Cyprus
- In office 23 April 2010 – 30 April 2015
- Prime Minister: Hüseyin Özgürgün (acting); İrsen Küçük; Sibel Siber; Özkan Yorgancıoğlu
- Preceded by: Mehmet Ali Talat
- Succeeded by: Mustafa Akıncı

Prime Minister of Northern Cyprus
- In office 5 May 2009 – 23 April 2010
- President: Mehmet Ali Talat
- Preceded by: Ferdi Sabit Soyer
- Succeeded by: Hüseyin Özgürgün (acting)
- In office 16 August 1996 – 13 January 2004
- President: Rauf Denktaş
- Preceded by: Hakkı Atun
- Succeeded by: Mehmet Ali Talat
- In office 19 July 1985 – 1 January 1994
- President: Rauf Denktaş; Hakkı Atun (acting); Rauf Denktaş
- Preceded by: Mustafa Çağatay
- Succeeded by: Hakkı Atun

Leader of the National Unity Party
- In office 29 November 2008 – 23 April 2010
- Preceded by: Tahsin Ertuğruloğlu
- Succeeded by: İrsen Küçük
- In office 18 December 1983 – 11 February 2006
- Preceded by: Mustafa Çağatay
- Succeeded by: Hüseyin Özgürgün

Minister of National Education, Training and Cultural Affairs
- In office 5 July 1976 – 10 May 1977
- Prime Minister: Nejat Konuk
- Preceded by: Office established
- Succeeded by: Orhan Zihni Bilgehan

Member of the Assembly of Republic
- In office 20 June 1976 – 22 April 2010
- Constituency: Gazimağusa (1976, 1981, 1985, 1990, 1993, 1998, 2003, 2005, 2009)

Personal details
- Born: 7 March 1938 (age 88) Famagusta, British Cyprus
- Party: National Unity Party
- Spouse: Meral Eroğlu
- Education: Istanbul University

Derviş Eroğlu (born 7 March 1938) is a Turkish Cypriot politician, who served as the president of Northern Cyprus from 2010 to 2015. Previously, he was Prime Minister from 1985 to 1994, 1996 to 2004 and again from 2009 to 2010 and twice-leader of the National Unity Party.

He served a term as prime minister of nearly 17 years, by this he was the longest-serving prime minister of the country. He also holds the record of longest-serving MP.

== Early life and education ==
Eroğlu was born in Famagusta in 1938. He studied medicine at Istanbul University, graduating in 1963. He later specialised in urology.

== Politics ==
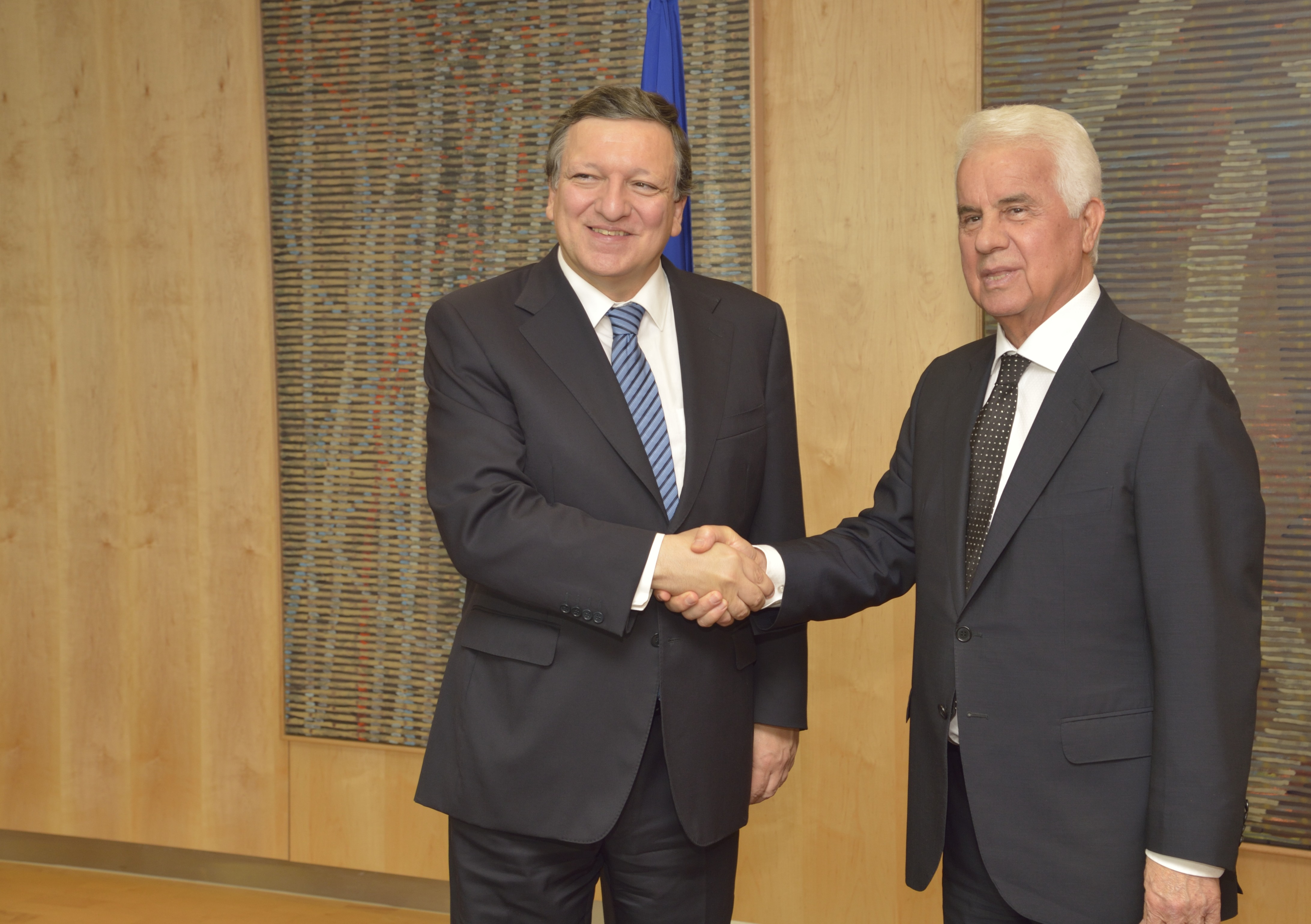
Eroğlu meeting José Manuel Barroso, President of the European Commission

Eroğlu entered the Assembly of the Republic of the then-Turkish Federated State of Northern Cyprus in 1976, serving as minister of education, culture, youth and sports during 1976–77. He served as member of the de facto Northern Cyprus (TRNC) Constituent Assembly in November 1983. As the leader of the National Unity Party (UBP), he was appointed prime minister in four successive governments between 1985 and 1993 (he was opposition leader between 1994 and 1996), and from 1996 until his party lost the general election to the Republican Turkish Party under Mehmet Ali Talat in 2004. Eroğlu's UBP won the majority of seats in the legislative election of 18 April 2009, and Eroğlu became prime minister again.

On 21 November 2005, Eroğlu resigned as leader of the UBP, stating that "it was time for younger blood to take control", but was re-elected to the chair in November 2008. Eroğlu was elected to the office of President of Northern Cyprus on 18 April 2010. Because the UN does not recognize the TRNC, it regards Derviş Eroğlu as bona fide negotiator for the Turkish Cypriot community of the Republic of Cyprus.

In the 2015 general elections, he was defeated by Mustafa Akıncı.

Political offices
Preceded by Mustafa Çağatay	Prime Minister of Northern Cyprus; 1985–1994	Succeeded by Hakkı Atun
Preceded by Hakkı Atun	Prime Minister of Northern Cyprus; 1996–2004	Succeeded by Mehmet Ali Talat
Preceded by Ferdi Sabit Soyer	Prime Minister of Northern Cyprus; 2009–2010	Succeeded by Hüseyin Özgürgün; Acting
Preceded by Mehmet Ali Talat	President of Northern Cyprus; 2010–2015	Succeeded by Mustafa Akıncı
