= National Unity Party (Northern Cyprus) =

Political party in Northern Cyprus

National Unity Party Ulusal Birlik Partisi
- Leader: Ünal Üstel
- Founder: Rauf Denktaş
- Founded: 11 October 1975; 50 years ago
- Headquarters: North Nicosia
- Ideology: Liberal conservatism National conservatism Turkish nationalism Two-state solution
- Political position: Right-wing
- European affiliation: European Conservatives and Reformists (until 2022)
- Colors: Orange; White; Black
- Parliament: 24 / 50
- Municipalities: 6 / 18

Website
- ulusalbirlikpartisi.com.tr

The National Unity Party (Turkish: Ulusal Birlik Partisi, UBP) is a political party in Northern Cyprus. The UBP party was founded by Rauf Denktaş on 11 October 1975. The party was in power from its creation until the 2003 elections with the exception of the period from 1994–1996. Ideologically, it has been variously described as conservative, nationalist, liberal conservative, and national-conservative. The party is positioned on the right-wing of the political spectrum, and it supports a two-state solution to the Cyprus dispute. Until April 2022, the party was a member of the European Conservatives and Reformists Party, which it had joined in April 2017.

In the 2005 Northern Cypriot presidential election, the party's candidate Derviş Eroğlu amassed 22.8% of the votes. In the 2009 Northern Cypriot parliamentary election, the party won 44% of the popular vote and 26 out of 50 seats, forming a majority government led by Eroğlu. The party also won the 2010 Northern Cyprus presidential election with Eroğlu as its candidate, and the 2020 Northern Cypriot presidential election with Ersin Tatar as its candidate. From 2016 until 2018 Northern Cypriot parliamentary election, the party was the senior partner in a minority government with the Democratic Party, with its leader Hüseyin Özgürgün serving as prime minister. It had previously been a junior partner in a coalition government with the Republican Turkish Party, preceded by a period as the opposition party between 2013 and 2015. Since January 2023, the party has been led by Ünal Üstel, who replaced Faiz Sucuoğlu.

== Election results ==
Assembly of the Republic
Election	Votes			Seats		Role	Notes
Election	No.	%	Rank	No.	±	Role	Notes
1976	408,380	53.8	1st	30 / 40	new	Government	
1981	431,732	42.5	1st	18 / 40	▼12	Government	
1985	546,582	36.8	1st	24 / 50	▲6	Government	
1990	954,592	54.7	1st	34 / 50	▲10	Government	
1993	535,316	29.8	1st	16 / 50	▼18	Opposition	In government from 1996
1998	440,626	40.3	1st	24 / 50	▲8	UBP–DP coalition	
2003	439,249	32.9	2nd	18 / 50	▼6	Opposition	
2005	410,813	31.7	2nd	19 / 50	▲1	Opposition	
2009	622,804	44.1	1st	26 / 50	▲7	Government	
2013	339,864	27.3	2nd	14 / 50	▼12	Opposition	In government from 2016
2018	1,907,030	35.6	1st	21 / 50	▲7	Government	In government from 2019
2022	1,971,400	39.5	1st	24 / 50	▲3	UBP–DP–YDP coalition	

== Party leaders ==
- Rauf Denktaş (11 October 1975 – 3 July 1976)
- Nejat Konuk (3 July 1976 – 2 March 1978)
- Osman Örek (18 April 1978 – 7 January 1979)
- Mustafa Çağatay (7 January 1979 – 30 November 1983)
- Derviş Eroğlu (18 December 1983 – 11 February 2006)
- Hüseyin Özgürgün (11 February 2006 – 16 December 2006)
- Tahsin Ertuğruloğlu (16 December 2006 – 29 November 2008)
- Derviş Eroğlu (29 November 2008 – 23 April 2010)
- İrsen Küçük (9 May 2010 – 11 June 2013)
- Hüseyin Özgürgün (31 August 2013 – 30 October 2018)
- Ersin Tatar (30 October 2018 – 23 October 2020)
- Ersan Saner (20 December 2020 – 31 October 2021)
- Faiz Sucuoğlu (31 October 2021 – 1 January 2023)
- Ünal Üstel (since 1 January 2023)

== See also ==
- List of political parties in Northern Cyprus
