= Assembly of the Republic (Northern Cyprus) =

Parliament of Northern Cyprus

Coordinates: 35°11′27″N 33°19′55″E

Assembly of the Republic Cumhuriyet Meclisi
- 10th Parliament of the Turkish Republic of Northern Cyprus
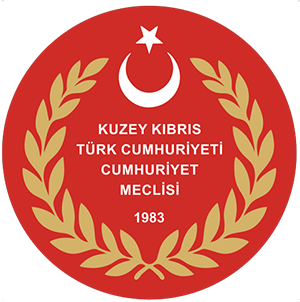

Type
- Type: Unicameral

History
- Founded: 15 November 1983
- Preceded by: Turkish Federated Assembly of Cyprus

Leadership
- Speaker of Parliament: Ziya Öztürkler (UBP) since 21 October 2024
- Deputy Speaker of Parliament: Fazilet Özdenefe (CTP) since 7 March 2022
- Prime Minister of Northern Cyprus: Ünal Üstel (UBP) since 12 May 2022
- Leader of the Main Opposition of Northern Cyprus: Sıla Usar İncirli (CTP) since 30 November 2025

Structure
- Seats: 50
- Political groups: Government (27) UBP (24) DP (3) Opposition (22) CTP (18) YDP (2) Ind. (2) Vacant (1)
- Length of term: 5 years

Elections
- Voting system: Party-list proportional representation D'Hondt method with 5% electoral threshold
- First election: 23 June 1985
- Last election: 23 January 2022
- Next election: 6 December 2026

Motto
- Egemenlik Kayıtsız Şartsız Ulusundur; Sovereignty unconditionally belongs to the Nation

Meeting place
- Assembly of the Republic Building; Ortaköy, Lefkoşa; Northern Cyprus

Website
- Assembly of the Northern Cyprus

The Assembly of the Republic (Turkish: Cumhuriyet Meclisi) is the parliament of the Turkish Republic of Northern Cyprus. It has 50 members, elected for a five-year term by mitigated proportional representation. A party must cross the electoral threshold (5% of the total vote) to be awarded any seats. The parliament is composed of 50 MPs, chosen from six electoral districts, which are coterminous with the districts of Northern Cyprus: Lefkoşa, Gazimağusa, Girne, Güzelyurt, Lefke and İskele.

In Northern Cyprus parliamentary elections, voters vote for individual candidates. There are two ways of voting.

- Voters can vote for a party, which in effect is voting for every MP candidate from that party in that district once. The voter can further prioritize the MPs in this kind of voting.
- Alternatively, the voter may not choose a party, but vote for candidates from different parties. In this kind of mixed voting, the voter cannot choose more than the number of MPs the district is allotted.

== Current composition ==
Parliamentary elections were last held on 23 January 2022.

Party	Votes	%	+/–	Seats	+/–
National Unity Party	1,971,400	39.54	+3.93	24	+3
Republican Turkish Party	1,597,137	32.04	+11.09	18	+6
Democratic Party	369,239	7.41	–0.41	3	0
People's Party	333,090	6.68	–10.39	3	–6
Rebirth Party	318,763	6.39	–0.60	2	0
Communal Democracy Party	220,610	4.42	–4.23	0	–3
Independence Path	97,575	1.96	New	0	New
Communal Liberation Party New Forces	76,902	1.54	–	0	0
Independents	827	0.02	–0.11	0	0
Total	4,985,543	100.00	–	50	0
Total votes	117,421	–			
Registered voters/turnout	203,792	57.62			
Source: BRTK

Note: Each voter may cast multiple votes, one for each seat in the parliament. Hence, the vote totals may exceed the number of registered voters.

== Location ==
The parliament building is located within the new TRNC Republic Complex, opposite the TRNC Presidency in North Nicosia.

In 2025, the National Assembly of Northern Cyprus relocated to the newly designated complex from Osmanpaşa Caddesi, also in North Nicosia The move aimed to modernize parliamentary facilities in Northern Cyprus.

== Council of Europe assembly representation ==
In 2004, the Turkish Cypriot community was awarded "observer status" in the Parliamentary Assembly of the Council of Europe (PACE). Since then, the two Turkish Cypriot representatives to PACE are elected by the Assembly of Northern Cyprus.

- 2005–2007: CTP Özdil Nami; UBP Huseyin Ozgurgun
- 27 January 2011: CTP Mehmet Caglar; UBP Ahmet Eti
- 4 December 2013: CTP Mehmet Caglar; UBP Tahsin Ertugruloglu

== See also ==
- List of speakers of the Assembly of the Republic (Northern Cyprus)
