= List of cabinets of Northern Cyprus =

This is a list of the Cabinets of the government of Northern Cyprus since 26 August 1974, the establishment of the Autonomous Turkish Cypriot Administration.

== From August 26, 1974 to November 15, 1983 ==
No.	Prime Minister	Period in office	In office as a result of	Party	Amendments
0	Rauf Denktaş (Note: Denktaş headed the committee as the head of state.)	August 26, 1974 - October 8, 1974	Establishment of the Autonomous Turkish Cypriot Administration	None	
1	Rauf Denktaş (Note: Denktaş headed the government as the head of state.)	October 8, 1974 – February 13, 1975		None	
2	Rauf Denktaş (Note: Denktaş headed the government as the head of state.)	February 13, 1975 – July 5, 1976	Establishment of the Turkish Federated State of Cyprus	None	
3	Nejat Konuk	July 5, 1976 – April 21, 1978		UBP	On July 7, 1977
4	Osman Örek	April 21, 1978 – December 12, 1978		UBP	
5	Mustafa Çağatay	December 12, 1978 – August 4, 1981		UBP	
6	Mustafa Çağatay	August 4, 1981 – March 15, 1982	Minority government after elections	UBP	
7	Mustafa Çağatay	March 15, 1982 – November 15, 1983		UBP-DHP-TBP	

== Cabinets of the Turkish Republic of Northern Cyprus ==
No. (As TRNC)	Prime Minister	Period in office	In office as a result of	Party	Amendments
7 (0)	Mustafa Çağatay	November 15, 1983 – December 13, 1983		UBP-DHP-TBP	
8 (1)	Nejat Konuk	December 13, 1983 – July 19, 1985	Caretaker government until scheduled elections after the declaration of the TRNC	None	
9 (2)	Derviş Eroğlu	July 19, 1985 – September 2, 1986		UBP-TKP	
10 (3)	Derviş Eroğlu	September 2, 1986 – May 23, 1988		UBP-YDP	
11 (4)	Derviş Eroğlu	May 23, 1988 – June 20, 1990		UBP-Independents	On May 11, 1989
12 (5)	Derviş Eroğlu	June 20, 1990 – January 1, 1994		UBP	On March 24, 1992
13 (6)	Hakkı Atun	January 1, 1994 – May 22, 1995		DP-CTP	On January 18, 1995
14 (7)	Hakkı Atun	May 22, 1995 – December 11, 1995		DP-CTP	
15 (8)	Hakkı Atun	December 11, 1995 – August 16, 1996		DP-CTP	
16 (9)	Derviş Eroğlu	August 16, 1996 – December 30, 1998		UBP-DP	On September 16, 1998
17 (10)	Derviş Eroğlu	December 30, 1998 – June 8, 2001		UBP-TKP	
18 (11)	Derviş Eroğlu	June 8, 2001 – January 13, 2004		UBP-DP	
19 (12)	Mehmet Ali Talat	January 13, 2004 – March 8, 2005		CTP-DP	On August 9, 2004
20 (13)	Mehmet Ali Talat	March 8, 2005 – April 26, 2005		CTP-DP	
21 (14)	Ferdi Sabit Soyer	April 26, 2005 – September 25, 2006		CTP-DP	
22 (15)	Ferdi Sabit Soyer	September 25, 2006 – May 4, 2009		CTP-ÖRP	On June 6, 2007; On March 11, 2008
23 (16)	Derviş Eroğlu	May 4, 2009 – May 17, 2010		UBP	
24 (17)	İrsen Küçük	May 17, 2010 – June 13, 2013		UBP	On April 6, 2011; On September 10, 2012; On September 18, 2012
25 (18)	Sibel Siber	June 13, 2013 – August 30, 2013	Caretaker government till scheduled early election	CTP-DP-TDP	
26 (19)	Özkan Yorgancıoğlu	August 30, 2013 – July 15, 2015		CTP-DP	On October 10, 2014; On May 12, 2015; On May 22, 2015; On May 29, 2015
27 (20)	Ömer Kalyoncu	July 15, 2015 – April 16, 2016		CTP-UBP	On October 19, 2015
28 (21)	Hüseyin Özgürgün	April 16, 2016 – February 2, 2018		UBP-DP-Independents	On November 2, 2017
28 (22)	Tufan Erhürman	February 2, 2018 – May 22, 2019		CTP-HP-TDP-DP	
29 (23)	Ersin Tatar	May 22, 2019 – December 9, 2020		UBP-HP	On June 19, 2020
30 (24)	Ersan Saner	December 9, 2020 – November 5, 2021		UBP-DP-YDP	
31 (25)	Faiz Sucuoğlu	November 5, 2021 – February 21, 2022	Caretaker government till scheduled early election	UBP-DP	
32 (26)	Faiz Sucuoğlu	February 21, 2022 – 12 May 2022		UBP-DP-YDP	
33	Ünal Üstel	12 May 2022		UBP	

== See also ==
- List of presidents of Northern Cyprus
- List of prime ministers of Northern Cyprus
