= Politics of Northern Cyprus =

The politics of Northern Cyprus takes place in a framework of a semi-presidential representative democratic republic, whereby the president is head of state and the prime minister is the head of government, and of a multi-party system. Executive power is exercised by the government. Legislative power is vested in both the government and the Assembly of the Republic. The judiciary is independent of the executive and the legislature.

Since the Turkish invasion of 1974, the Republic of Cyprus has been divided: the northern third of the island was unilaterally declared to be the Turkish Republic of Northern Cyprus (TRNC) by its Turkish Cypriot population. The United Nations considers the declaration of independence of Northern Cyprus to be legally invalid and calls for the withdrawal of troops from Turkey that invaded the island in support of the Turkish Cypriot minority. The government of Northern Cyprus has not been diplomatically recognized only by the Government of Turkey since its unilateral declaration of independence in 1983.

In 1974, the Greek-backed Cypriot National Guard took over the government in a coup. Turkey sent troops in response, claiming it had authority under the 1960 Treaty of Guarantee, Turkish Cypriots set up their own institutions as the "Turkish Federated State of North Cyprus". In 1983, the Turkish Cypriots unilaterally declared independence as the Turkish Republic of Northern Cyprus (TRNC). In 1985, they adopted a constitution and held elections—an arrangement thus far recognized only by Turkey.

== Political conditions ==
From 1975 to 2005, the president was Rauf Denktaş. An ardent nationalist, he pursued a policy of trying to gain international recognition of Northern Cyprus. However, this stance proved to be a major stumbling block to reconciliation efforts. This stance, while initially supported by the Turkish Cypriot populace, began to work against him when the Republic of Cyprus joined the European Union.

Northern Cyprus held multi-party parliamentary elections in 1993, removing the long-ruling National Unity Party in favour of a coalition of the Democratic Party and Republican Turkish Party (CTP). However, in August 1996, a new coalition was formed between the two main rightist parties, the National Unity Party and the Democratic Party, which stayed in power for the next eight years. In 2003, the CTP and DP formed a new government, placing CTP leader Mehmet Ali Talat as the new prime minister.

In 2005, Rauf Denktaş retired from the presidency. Talat won the presidential election, becoming the second President of the republic. He resigned as prime minister, and replaced by CTP Deputy Leader Ferdi Sabit Soyer.

UN-sponsored negotiations to develop institutional arrangements acceptable to both communities began in 1968; several sets of negotiations and other initiatives followed. Turkish Cypriots focused on bi-zonality, security guarantees, and political equality between the two communities. The Greek Cypriots however emphasized the rights of unrestricted population movement, recovery of property, resettlement, and the return of territory to their control. Turkish Cypriots favour a federation of two nearly autonomous societies living side by side with limited contact, and allowing Turkish migrants to stay, while Greek Cypriots envision a more integrated structure, and requiring the Turkish migrants to leave the island.

UN Secretary-General Kofi Annan tried to present a compromise formula which would have enabled a federal state to be established on the island. While there were serious compromises made on both sides, neither the Greek and Turkish Cypriot leaderships were happy with the final plan. Nonetheless, it was decided to put the issue to the voters.

In 2004, the Annan Plan was supported in a referendum by two-thirds of the Turkish Cypriots voting. However, it was defeated by nearly three-quarters of the Greek Cypriots. Had the plan been accepted by both communities, the United Cyprus Republic would have resulted. However, the rejection by the Greek Cypriots meant that only they could benefit from all the privileges of EU membership. (Turkish Cypriots of genuine Cypriot extraction are able to apply for Republic of Cyprus passports.) This has started to change international attitudes towards the Turkish Cypriots as the Republic of Cyprus government still insists upon maintaining the international embargoes on the TRNC despite the results of the vote.

In October 2020, Ersin Tatar, the candidate of the National Unity Party (UBP), was elected as the 5th president of the Turkish Republic of Northern Cyprus after winning the presidential elections against incumbent president Mustafa Akıncı.

== Executive branch ==
Main office-holders
Office	Name	Party	Since
President	Ersin Tatar	National Unity Party	23 October 2020
Prime Minister	Ünal Üstel	National Unity Party	12 May 2022

== Legislative branch ==
Northern Cyprus elects a legislature. The Assembly of the Republic (Cumhuriyet Meclisi) has 50 members, elected for a five-year term by mitigated proportional representation. A party must cross the election threshold (5% of the total vote) to get any seats in parliament. The parliament is composed of 50 MPs, chosen from 6 electoral districts, Lefkoşa (Nicosia), Mağusa (Famagusta), Girne (Kyrenia), Güzelyurt (Morphou), Iskele (Trikomo) and Lefke (Lefka). In parliamentary elections, voters vote for individual candidates. There are two ways of voting for this.

- One can either vote for a party, which in effect means is voting for every candidate from that party in that electoral district once. Voter can further prioritize the MPs in this kind of voting.
- Or alternatively one may not choose a party but would vote for different candidates from different parties. In this kind of mixed voting, a person can not choose more than the number of MPs from that district.

== Political parties and elections ==
The presidential election takes place every 5 years. In the elections, in order to secure outright victory, a candidate has to have at least 50% of the votes. Otherwise the candidates that receive the two highest votes will go to second round voting one week later and the winner becomes the president.

Summary of the 2020 presidential election results:

Candidate	Party	First round		Second round	
Candidate	Party	Votes	%	Votes	%
Ersin Tatar	National Unity Party	35,825	32.35	67,322	51.69
Mustafa Akıncı (inc.)	Independent	33,053	29.84	62,910	48.31
Tufan Erhürman	Republican Turkish Party	24,008	21.68		
Kudret Özersay	Independent	6,356	5.74		
Erhan Arıklı	Rebirth Party	5,937	5.36		
Serdar Denktaş	Independent	4,653	4.20		
Fuat Türköz Çiner	Nationalist Democracy Party	327	0.30		
Arif Salih Kırdağ	Independent	282	0.25		
Alpan Uz	Independent	156	0.14		
Ahmet Boran	Independent	83	0.07		
Mustafa Ulaş	Independent	69	0.06		
Total		110,749	100.00	130,232	100.00
Valid votes		110,749	95.66	130,232	97.24
Invalid/blank votes		5,027	4.34	3,699	2.76
Total votes		115,776	100.00	133,931	100.00
Registered voters/turnout		198,867	58.22	199,029	67.29
Source: Kibris Online, Kibris Online

Summary of the 2018 parliamentary election results:

Party	Votes	%	Seats	+/–
National Unity Party	1,920,517	35.61	21	+7
Republican Turkish Party	1,129,938	20.95	12	–9
People's Party	920,490	17.07	9	New
Communal Democracy Party	466,369	8.65	3	+1
Democratic Party	421,792	7.82	3	–9
Rebirth Party	376,826	6.99	2	New
Alliance for Change and Liberation (TKP-YG+BKP)	143,863	2.67	0	0
Nationalist Democracy Party	7,099	0.13	0	New
Independents	6,955	0.13	0	0
Total	5,393,849	100.00	50	0
Valid votes	112,004	88.86		
Invalid/blank votes	14,036	11.14		
Total votes	126,040	100.00		
Registered voters/turnout	190,553	66.14		
Source: YSK

== Judicial branch ==
Magistrate Courts. They handle all minor criminal cases and minor civil cases, including small claims. Criminal courts can impose sentences of up to 5 years imprisonment

Traffic Courts. They handle all violations of traffic rules. The highest penalty they can impose are fines and community service.

Administrative District Courts They handle all administrative cases including tax, probate, immigration, and citizenship issues.

Family Courts. Handle all cases involving family law

Labor Courts. Handle all cases involving labor law.

Criminal District Courts. They handle all cases of first instance in major criminal cases, major civil cases, and juvenile.

Military District Courts. Handle all criminal, civil, and administrative cases involving military personnels.

Supreme Court. Is the only and last court of appeals in all cases for all courts. Judges are appointed by the High Judicial Council (made up of eight High Court judges, the President of the Republic, representatives from the Republic's Assembly, the Bar, and the Prosecutor General).

Source: BRTK

== Other issues ==
Political pressure groups and leaders: Federation of Turkish Cypriot Labor Unions (or Turk-Sen)

International organization participation: Organisation of Islamic Cooperation (OIC) (observer-state member), Economic Cooperation Organization (ECO) (observer-state member)

== See also ==
- Politics of Turkey
