= 2020 Northern Cypriot presidential election =

- 11 October 2020 (first round); 18 October 2020 (second round)
- Turnout: 58.31% (first round); 67.29% (second round)
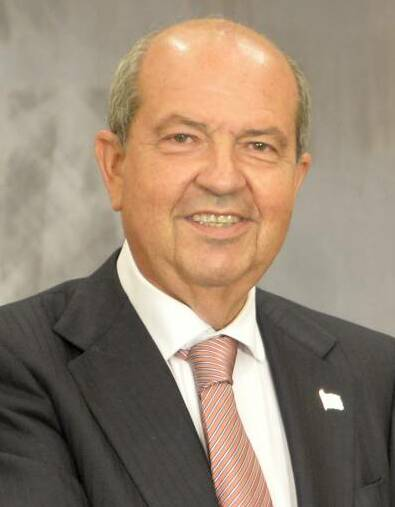

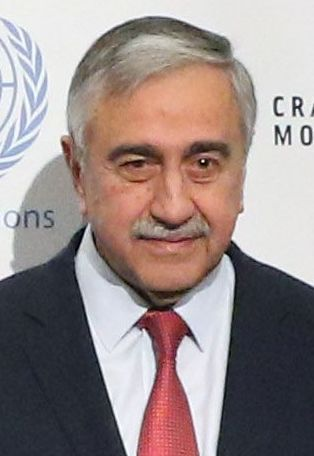
| Candidate | Ersin Tatar | Mustafa Akıncı |
| Party | UBP | Independent |
| Popular vote | 67,322 | 62,910 |
| Percentage | 51.69% | 48.31% |
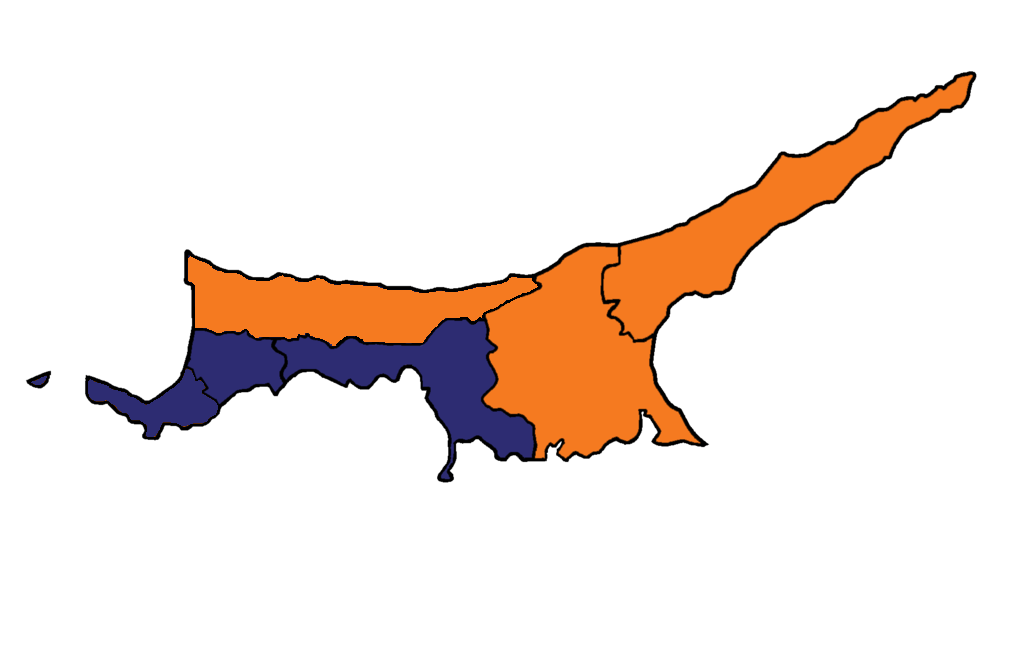
- Second round results by district
President before election
Mustafa Akıncı
Independent
Elected President
Ersin Tatar
UBP

Presidential elections were held in Northern Cyprus on 11 October 2020 alongside a constitutional referendum, with a run-off held on 18 October 2020. They were originally scheduled to take place on 26 April 2020, but were postponed in March 2020 for six months due to the COVID-19 pandemic. No candidate won a majority of votes in the first round.

The two candidates contesting the second round were Mustafa Akıncı, the incumbent president running as an independent candidate and supporting a federal solution to the Cyprus dispute, and Ersin Tatar, the Prime Minister, running as the National Unity Party candidate, and opposing a federal solution in favour of a two-state solution. During his first term in office after being elected in 2015, Akıncı pursued a relationship with Turkey on the basis of Northern Cyprus not becoming a "sub-administration", whilst Tatar deemed Akıncı's stance too belligerent and promised to repair relations. The elections have been marked by controversies surrounding allegations and reports of interference from the Turkish government, with Akıncı claiming he was threatened by Turkish authorities in an attempt to force him to withdraw his candidacy. Five days before the first round, Tatar announced a partial reopening of the ghost town of Varosha, sparking international condemnation and the fall of his cabinet after the junior partner in the coalition withdrew from the government.

Despite the parties of candidates receiving lower votes in the first round predominantly supporting Mustafa Akıncı, including the Republican Turkish Party (CTP), Tatar won a narrow victory in the second round and thus became the 5th President of Northern Cyprus. His victory, which was the closest ever margin in the history of Northern Cyprus, was welcomed by most political parties in Turkey.

== Electoral system ==
The President of Northern Cyprus is elected using the two-round system. If no candidate receives a majority of the vote in the first round, a second is held between the top two candidates.

== Candidates ==
11 candidates ran in the first round of the election:

- Mustafa Akıncı (Independent, supported by TDP and others)
- Tufan Erhürman (CTP)
- Ersin Tatar (UBP)
- Kudret Özersay (Independent, supported by HP)
- Serdar Denktaş (Independent, supported by DP)
- Erhan Arıklı (YDP)
- Fuat Türköz Çiner (MDP)
- Arif Salih Kırdağ (Independent)
- Alpan Uz (Independent)
- Ahmet Boran (Independent)
- Mustafa Ulaş (Independent)

== Campaigns ==
=== Mustafa Akıncı ===
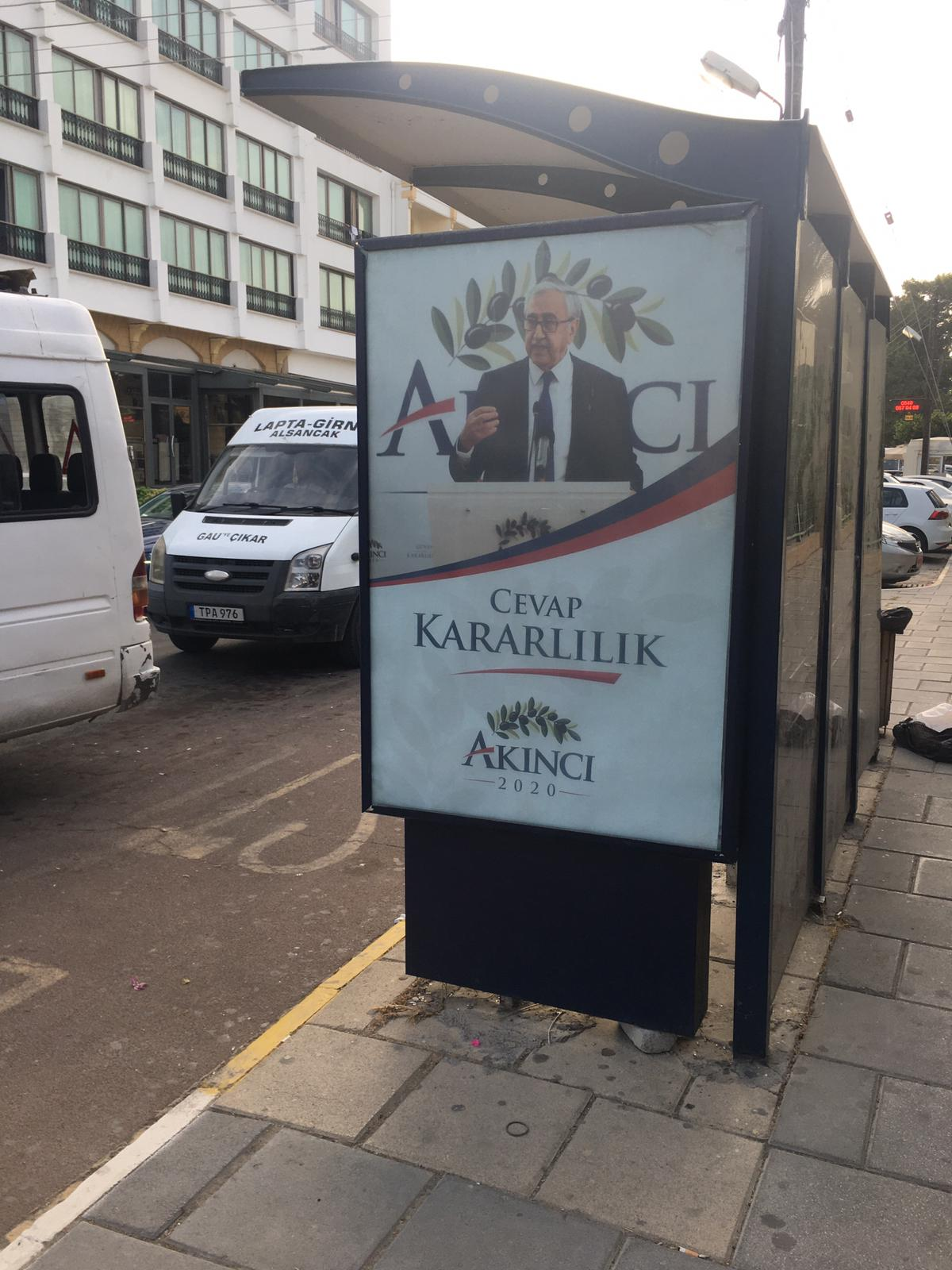
An Akıncı campaign poster in Kyrenia. The slogan reads "The answer is determination".

Akıncı, the incumbent president, sought re-election as an independent. He announced his candidacy and set out his vision for a second term on 5 February 2020 at a rally in Nicosia titled "Trust and Determination Evening". He defended the federal model for the resolution of the Cyprus dispute as the only feasible and reasonable option, declaring "We do not want to be a minority amongst Greek Cypriots, nor do we want to be a sub-administration dependent on Turkey." His re-election bid was shaped around the slogan "The Answer is Akıncı" (Turkish: Cevap Akıncı), and the themes promoted in the campaign included "trust", "determination", "sincerity" and "responsibility", all associated with Akıncı.

The left-wing Communal Democracy Party (TDP) chairman Cemal Özyiğit declared his party's support for Akıncı's re-election on 23 October 2019, when Akıncı was yet to announce his candidacy. Other parties to declare support for Akıncı in the first round were the extraparliamentary Communal Liberation Party New Forces, Independence Path, United Cyprus Party and Left Movement. The Republican Turkish Party declared its support for Akıncı in the second round, while the New Cyprus Party called on voters not to vote for Ersin Tatar.

=== Ersin Tatar ===
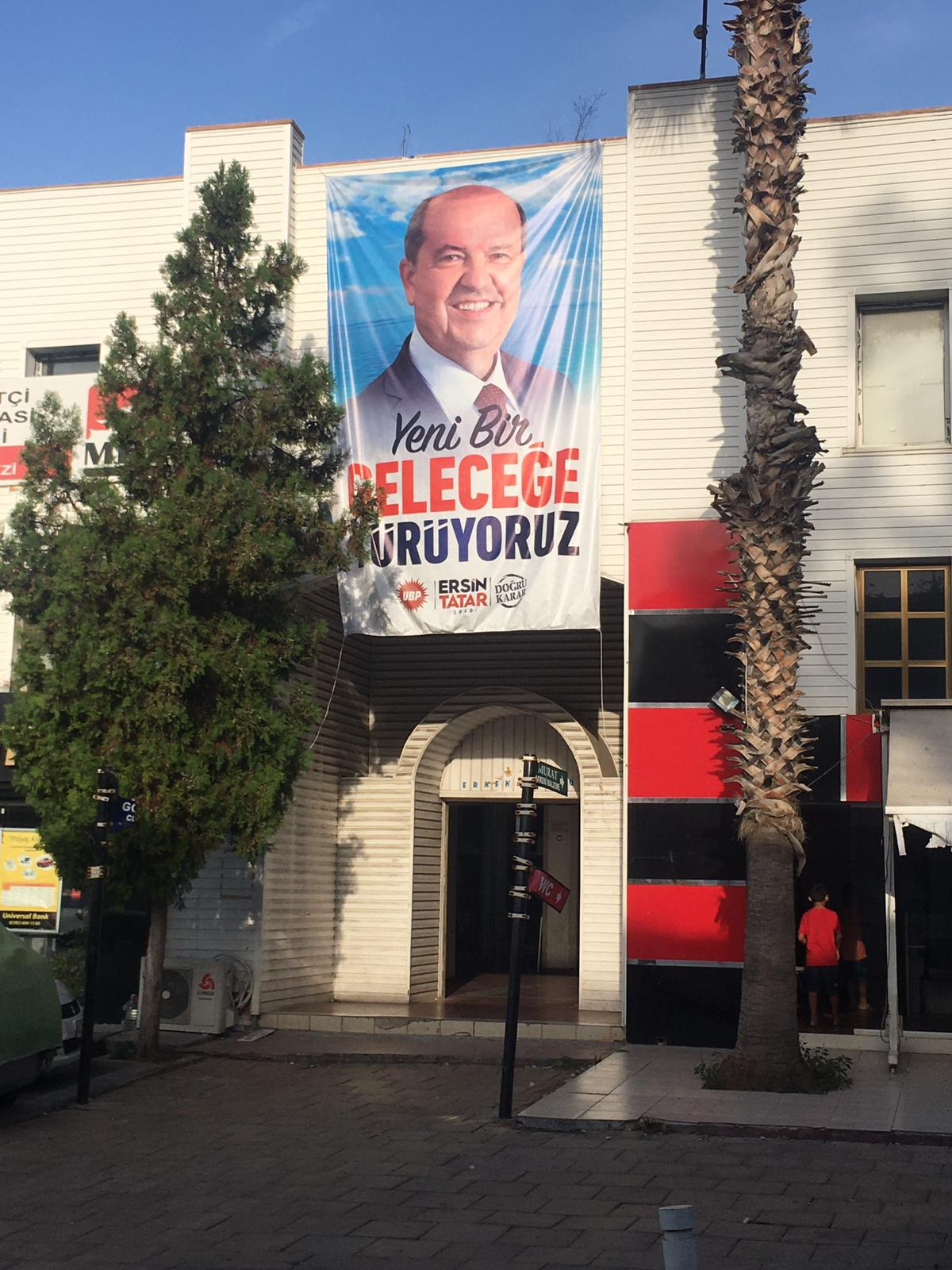
A banner of Ersin Tatar in Kyrenia, with the banner reading "We are walking to a new future".

Ersin Tatar, leader of the right-wing National Unity Party (UBP) and Prime Minister, put forward his candidacy representing the UBP on 18 January 2020. He set out his vision for the Presidency on 16 September 2020, in an event in Nicosia titled "We are walking to a new future". Whilst Tatar has said that he would be willing to negotiate with Greek Cypriots for a resolution of the Cyprus dispute, he advocated a two-state solution, involving separate Turkish Cypriot and Greek Cypriot states in the European Union as his preferential model. He based this on his position that, having been explored as an option 1977, he believed the federal model for Cyprus to have been exhausted. A key campaign promise was to fully reopen the ghost town of Varosha, with the land being used by its original inhabitants under Turkish Cypriot sovereignty. He also held that Akıncı had been too belligerent with regards to the relationship with Turkey, and he said that he would undo the "damage" in the Turkey-Northern Cyprus relations brought upon by Akıncı.

Tatar's central campaign slogan was "We are walking to a new future" (Turkish: Yeni bir geleceğe yürüyoruz), with an emphasis in his campaign on the message "Enough is enough! We will not lose another five years."

Political parties to declare support for Tatar in the second round were the Democratic Party the Rebirth Party and extraparliamentary the Nationalist Democracy Party.

=== Tufan Erhürman ===
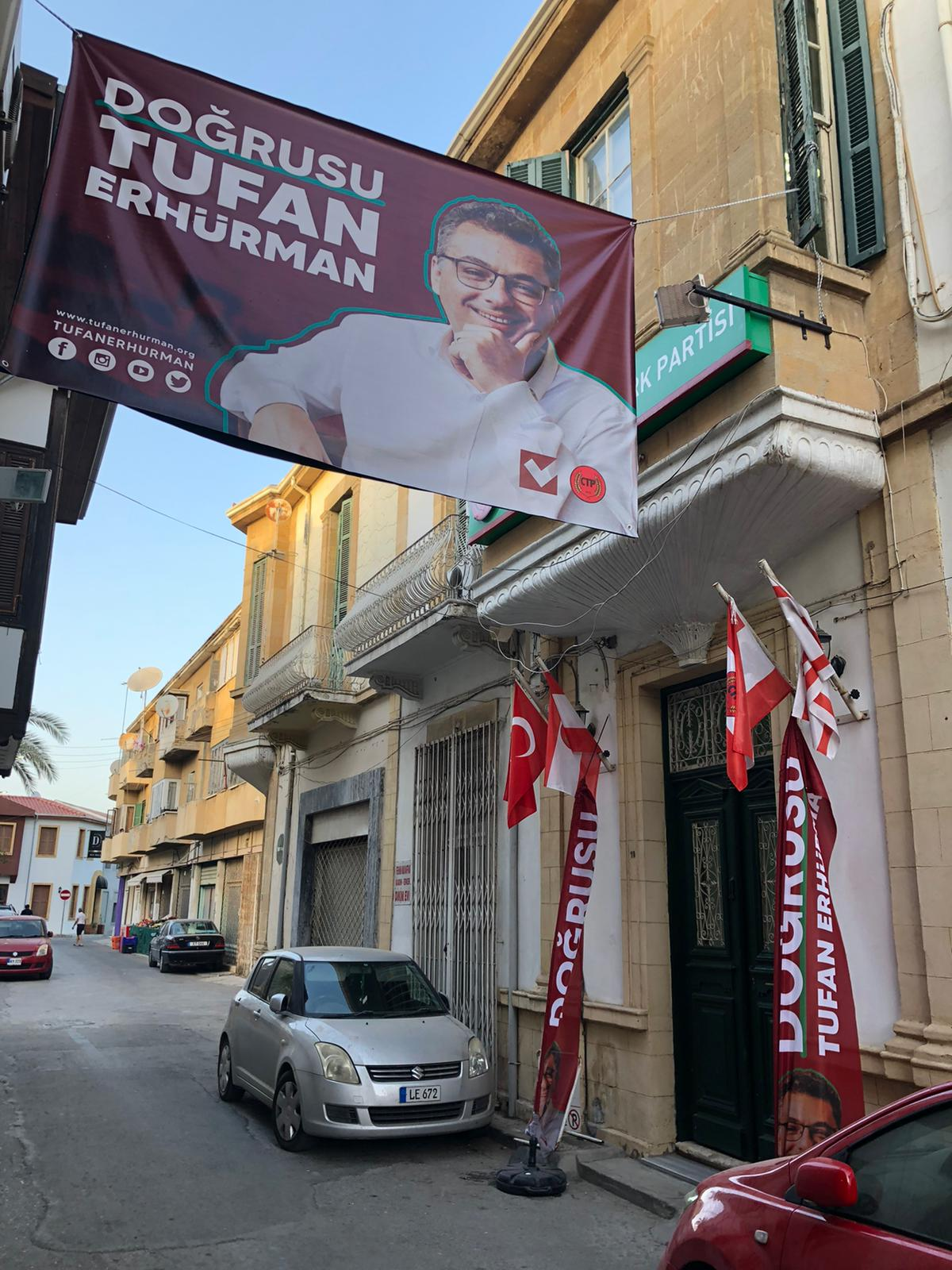
Tufan Erhürman banners in front of CTP headquarters in Nicosia

Tufan Erhürman, head of the left-wing Republican Turkish Party (CTP), Leader of the Main Opposition and former Prime Minister, put forward his candidacy as the representative of his party on 17 December 2019, in an expanded party meeting in Nicosia. A proponent of the federal solution, Erhürman initially set out a "three-piece" vision for the Presidency, with the three pieces consisting of a comprehensive solution to the Cyprus dispute, a proactive foreign policy and a self-sustaining economy. He promised to campaign proactively against the embargo against Northern Cyprus on fields such as trade and sports, whilst still striving for a "result-oriented" process to solve the Cyprus dispute. Whilst the president of Northern Cyprus has often left the major executive functions to the office of the Prime Minister, Erhürman promised a more active role for the Presidency in internal politics, foreseeing the Presidency as a stabiliser and a "bridge" between the short-lasting, volatile governments of Northern Cyprus.

Erhürman emphasised that he would place relations with Turkey, the European Union and Greek Cypriots "on the correct footing", with a particular emphasis on Turkish Cypriot "will" and self-sufficiency. He promoted "dialogue" as a basis for relations with Turkey, saying that he would act "responsibly, not problematically".

Erhürman's campaign slogan was "The correct one is Tufan Erhürman" (Turkish: Doğrusu Tufan Erhürman), with a particular messaging focus on "all-round leadership".

=== Kudret Özersay ===
Kudret Özersay, Deputy Prime Minister and Minister of Foreign of Affairs, resigned from his position as head of the People's Party (HP) to run as an independent, supported by the HP. Özersay's campaign emphasised his previous experience as Chief Negotiator and a scholar of international law, and used the slogan "This is his job" (Turkish: Bu, onun işi, with a double meaning, also meaning "he can get this done"). Özersay ran on a platform advocating that there were alternatives to a federal solution, proposing a model of "partnership based on collaboration" instead. Another key campaign promise was to reopen Varosha, but only after "informing the international community correctly" about the nature of the reopening.

== Campaign issues ==
=== Controversy over Turkish interference ===
Mustafa Akıncı made multiple statements over the course of the campaign that the government of Turkey was actively interfering in the elections against him. He stated on 1 October that members of the Turkish parliament of the ruling Justice and Development Party and Nationalist Movement Party were touring villages in Northern Cyprus, telling people not to vote for Akıncı, and that he had been receiving insults and threats from Turkish "sources". The Turkish embassy in Nicosia released a statement condemning "the mentality that considered every Turkish team on the island an interference in the elections" and said that it was unacceptable that "Turkey was being turned into campaign material".

On 9 October, Akıncı stated that he had been threatened by Turkish authorities early in his campaign, with a "person related to intelligence activity in Cyprus" telling his chief of staff that it would be "better for Akıncı himself, his family and the nation" if he withdrew from the election. He also revealed that his, his Chief of Staff's and his campaign team's emails had been hacked into. The Turkish embassy in Nicosia categorically denied that Akıncı had been threatened. Tatar said that it was unacceptable for a President to make such statements about Turkey.

On 5 October, Özgür Gazete, an online newspaper in Northern Cyprus, published photos of Ersin Tatar meeting advisors of the Turkish Vice-president Fuat Oktay in a hotel in Kyrenia, reporting that the meetings had been taking place daily with Tatar briefing a Turkish ruling party campaign team about campaign developments and receiving strategic directives. Tatar released a statement in response, claiming that "foreign intelligence agencies had been secretly photographing technical teams from Turkey and serving them to websites set up specifically to manipulate the election". He claimed that the photos were a violation of his right to privacy, and that the state would "take legal action against those who committed against the State and the nation". Tatar's statement was condemned by the CTP, the TDP and various civil society organisations as an assault on the freedom of the press.

Various pro-government Turkish newspapers also ran headlines attacking Akıncı in the run-up to the election.

=== Partial reopening of Varosha and the fall of the government ===
On 6 October 2020, with five days to go before the election, Ersin Tatar flew to Ankara upon the special invitation of Turkish President Recep Tayyip Erdoğan. This was the date for the scheduled reopening of the Northern Cyprus Water Supply Project after months of repairs, but the High Electoral Board had banned any political speeches at the reopening ceremony in Cyprus. The ceremony took place nonetheless, with Tatar and Erdoğan taking part virtually via videoconferencing from a live press conference in Ankara.

During the ceremony, Tatar announced that the ghost town of Varosha, which had been sealed off during the 1974 conflict after the flight of its Greek Cypriot population, would be partially reopened on 8 October. This would involve the reopening of a couple of avenues and the beach for the public to visit. Erdoğan stated his support for the move and said that the infrastructure work required would be completed swiftly.

The move met with condemnation from Josep Borrell, the foreign policy chief of the European Union, and expressions of concern from the United Nations Security Council and Russia. The UN Security Council presidential statement urged the reversal of the decision and that the UN Security Council decisions regarding Varosha be respected.

This move was seen as a pre-election political manoeuvre by other political figures in Northern Cyprus. Akıncı said that the developments were "a black stain on Turkish Cypriot democracy", saying that they constituted "yet another development in the interference with our elections just to confer advantage to one candidate". He also called using the reopening of Varosha as campaign material a "grave mistake".

Kudret Özersay, Deputy Prime Minister, Minister of Foreign Affairs and member of the People's Party, the junior partner in the ruling coalition, said that he had no prior knowledge of the reopening, and that without a Council of Ministers decision, this could not possibly be a real reopening of Varosha. The Party Assembly of the People's Party decided to withdraw from the coalition, leading to a collapse of the government, citing Ersin Tatar's "bypassing" of his coalition partners and "using Varosha as an election ploy" as the reason.

== Opinion polls ==
=== First round ===
| Polling firm | Date | Sample size | Akıncı TDP | Tatar UBP | Erhürman CTP | Özersay HP | Others | Lead |
|---|---|---|---|---|---|---|---|---|
| Gezici | 8–10 February 2020 | 4,428 | 29.3 | 32.6 | 17.4 | - | 29.7 | 3.3 |
| Gezici | 11–13 January 2020 | 3,264 | 28.8 | 34.2 | 17.4 | 8.3 | 14.2 | 5.4 |
| Gezici | December 2019 | – | 28.2 | 33.9 | 19.7 | 10.5 | 7.7 | 5.7 |

=== Second round ===
| Polling firm | Date | Sample size | Akıncı TDP | Tatar UBP | Lead |
|---|---|---|---|---|---|
| Gezici | 8–10 February 2020 | 4,428 | 46.9 | 53.1 | 6.2 |
| Gezici | 11–13 January 2020 | 3,264 | 47.5 | 52.5 | 5.0 |
| Gezici | December 2019 | – | 45.4 | 54.6 | 9.2 |

== Results ==
The first round results were regarded in the Turkish Cypriot media as a disappointment for Özersay, Arıklı and Denktaş, and especially for Özersay, who had suffered a loss of 15% from the previous election. Özersay said that he would "reconsider his future political career" based on the election results, saying that he had performed far below his expectations. Erhürman congratulated the two candidates reaching the second round and said that the election results would be critiqued by the CTP Party Assembly.

On 13 October, the CTP Party Assembly unanimously voted to support Akıncı in the second round, citing their common goal of the federal solution as the rationale. Arıklı's YDP and the Democratic Party endorsed Tatar for the second round. The DP decision was a contested one, and as a response, Serdar Denktaş resigned from the party that he had previously led for 21 years, releasing a statement implying that he would vote for Akıncı and saying "If my party cannot defend its honour, I have to defend mine".

Tatar was elected in the second round by a narrow margin, winning 51.74% of the vote. The Gazimağusa and İskele districts swayed the result in favour of Tatar, with Tatar attaining 70.79% of the votes in İskele. Tatar had a lead of 1% in Girne District, whilst Akıncı won all three remaining districts, garnering 56.14% of the votes in the capital Lefkoşa District.

| Candidate | Party | First round | | Second round | |
| Candidate | Party | Votes | % | Votes | % |
|---|---|---|---|---|---|
| Ersin Tatar | National Unity Party | 35,872 | 32.34 | 67,322 | 51.69 |
| Mustafa Akıncı | Independent | 33,058 | 29.80 | 62,910 | 48.31 |
| Tufan Erhürman | Republican Turkish Party | 24,075 | 21.71 | | |
| Kudret Özersay | Independent | 6,365 | 5.74 | | |
| Erhan Arıklı | Rebirth Party | 5,999 | 5.41 | | |
| Serdar Denktaş | Independent | 4,627 | 4.17 | | |
| Fuat Türköz Çiner | Nationalist Democracy Party | 329 | 0.30 | | |
| Arif Salih Kırdağ | Independent | 282 | 0.25 | | |
| Alpan Uz | Independent | 155 | 0.14 | | |
| Ahmet Boran | Independent | 84 | 0.08 | | |
| Mustafa Ulaş | Independent | 69 | 0.06 | | |
| Total | | 110,915 | 100.00 | 130,232 | 100.00 |
| Valid votes | | 110,915 | 95.64 | 130,232 | 97.24 |
| Invalid/blank votes | | 5,051 | 4.36 | 3,699 | 2.76 |
| Total votes | | 115,966 | 100.00 | 133,931 | 100.00 |
| Registered voters/turnout | | 198,867 | 58.31 | 199,029 | 67.29 |
Source: YSK, YSK

== Aftermath ==
Speaking after he was elected, Tatar thanked the Turkish Cypriot electorate, who elected him "out of free will", as well as the political parties that supported him in the second round, "motherland Turkey" and Turkish President Recep Tayyip Erdoğan. He promised an expansion of the relations with Turkey, stated that he would be ready for talks on the resolution of the Cyprus dispute "based on facts" and speaking in English, said "We are the voice of Turkish Cypriots, we are fighters, we are fighting to exist within the TRNC, Therefore our neighbours in the south and the international community should respect our fight to live with freedom within the TRNC." Tatar was immediately congratulated by Turkish President Erdoğan, as well as the Turkish Minister of Foreign Affairs, Mevlüt Çavuşoğlu.

In his concession speech, Akıncı congratulated Tatar, but reiterated that "this was not an election conducted under normal circumstances", and wished that "no one would resort to these ways once again". He also said that "it would be beneficial for Turkish Cypriots to assess which results came out of which region". He announced that he would be ending his political career.

Amongst Greek Cypriots, the left-wing opposition party AKEL called the election result a "negative development", but added that "the Greek Cypriot side must remain committed and consistent in resuming negotiations from the point they left off". EDEK stated that the Greek Cypriots should put an "end to illusions", claiming that the results showed that Ankara had the defining role in decision making in the north. President Nicos Anastasiades stated that the verdict of Turkish Cypriots is absolutely respected.
