= 2018 Northern Cypriot parliamentary election =

- 7 January 2018
- All 50 seats in the Assembly of the Republic; 26 seats needed for a majority
Party	Leader	Vote %	Seats	+/–
UBP	Hüseyin Özgürgün	35.61	21	+7
CTP	Tufan Erhürman	20.95	12	−9
HP	Kudret Özersay	17.07	9	New
TDP	Cemal Özyiğit	8.65	3	0
DP	Serdar Denktaş	7.82	3	−9
YDP	Erhan Arıklı	6.99	2	New
This lists parties that won seats. See the complete results below.
Results by constituency
Prime Minister before	Prime Minister after
Hüseyin Özgürgün; UBP	Tufan Erhürman; CTP

Parliamentary elections were held in Northern Cyprus on 7 January 2018 to elect the 50 members of the Assembly of the Republic for a five-year term. Going into the elections, the government was led by Prime Minister Hüseyin Özgürgün, who had served since 16 April 2016, leading a coalition consisting of the National Unity Party and the Democratic Party.

Following the elections, a new coalition government was formed by the Republican Turkish Party (CTP), the People's Party, Communal Democracy Party and the Democratic Party, with CTP leader Tufan Erhürman becoming prime minister.

== Background ==
=== 2013 parliamentary election ===
The 2013 parliamentary elections resulted in the election of Özkan Yorgancıoğlu of the center-left Republican Turkish Party (CTP) as Prime Minister. His party formed a coalition with the right-leaning Democratic Party (DP), led by Serdar Denktaş. Meanwhile, the nationalist National Unity Party (UBP) became the main opposition party.

The CTP secured 38% of the vote and 21 seats. Its rivals in the UBP fell to 27% of the vote and 14 seats. Two other parties, the DP and the Communal Democracy Party (TDP), managed to enter parliament with 23% and 7% of the vote respectively. Owing to a 5% election threshold, the United Cyprus Party failed to win any seats, having won only 3% of the vote.

=== 2015 presidential election ===
The 2015 presidential elections were held on 19 April, with a runoff the following week on 26 April. In the first round of voting, the incumbent, UBP-backed President Derviş Eroğlu received 30,328 votes, or slightly above 28% of the total. Mustafa Akıncı, a former MP for the TDP, came second with 27%, while Sibel Siber of the CTP and the independent candidate Kudret Özersay won 22.5% and 21% respectively. As a result, Eroğlu and Akıncı proceeded to a second round of voting on 26 April. Ultimately, Akıncı secured a landslide victory, securing 60.5% of the vote against 39.5% for Eroğlu. Akıncı was formally inaugurated as the fourth President of Northern Cyprus on 30 April 2015.

Mehmet Ali Talat then challenged Prime Minister Yorgancıoğlu for the leadership of the CTP; this was owing in part to the poor performance of the party in the presidential race. Talat defeated the prime minister, triggering the latter's resignation. Since only MPs may serve in the Cabinet of Northern Cyprus, Talat did not become prime minister; the position ultimately went to Ömer Kalyoncu, who was sworn in on 16 July 2015. Kalyoncu formed a grand coalition of the CTP and the UBP, as opposed to the former CTP–DP constellation. His administration was short-lived, however; Hüseyin Özgürgün managed to establish a right-wing coalition on 16 April 2016, consisting of the DP of Serdar Denktaş—son of the TRNC's pater patriae, Rauf Denktaş—and the UBP.

== Electoral system ==
The fifty members of the Assembly were elected by proportional representation in six multi-member constituencies with an electoral threshold of 5%. Voters can vote for either a party list or individual candidates. If they choose the latter, they may cast as many votes as there are seats in each constituency. Voters are not limited to their constituency if they wish to vote for individual candidates; they may vote for candidates in any constituency so long as the total number of votes cast is between 24 and 50.

== Participating parties ==
Party	Ideology	Leader
Republican Turkish Party (CTP)	Social democracy, pro-reunification	Tufan Erhürman
National Unity Party (UBP)	Turkish nationalism, conservatism	Hüseyin Özgürgün
Democratic Party (DP)	Turkish nationalism, conservatism	Serdar Denktaş
Communal Democracy Party (TDP)	Social democracy, pro-reunification	Cemal Özyiğit
People's Party (HP)	Centrism	Kudret Özersay
Rebirth Party (YDP)	Turkish nationalism	Erhan Arıklı
Communal Liberation Party-New Forces (TKP-YG)	Social democracy, pro-reunification	Mehmet Çakıcı

=== Change and Liberation Alliance ===
Mehmet Çakıcı's TKP-YG had agreed to form an "election coalition" with the United Cyprus Party (BKP). Under this arrangement BKP members were to run for the parliament on the TKP-YG list. Tözün Tunalı's Social Democrat Party, and a fraction from the CTP led by Sonay Adem, had previously joined with TKP-YG. The New Cyprus Party was also asked to join, but refused to be a part of the Alliance.

== Campaigns ==
=== National Unity Party (UBP) ===
The first six UBP candidates were announced by Özgürgün, Prime Minister and the leader of the party, on 16 November. These candidates included Özgürgün himself, as well as Özdemir Berova and Hakan Dinçyürek who were serving at the time as independent MPs, having been previously elected from the DP list. Other candidates and their order on the ballot were determined in a primary election on 18 November, in which 11,616 party members were eligible to vote. The three candidates that received the highest numbers of votes were Faiz Sucuoğlu, Ersin Tatar and Hasan Taçoy.

In the run-up to the election, the government's practice of accepting numerous people into citizenship and delivering land titles was criticised as corrupt. Özgürgün countered these accusations by saying that these were practices carried out by previous governments as well and that the Republic of Cyprus actually bestowed citizenship in return for money. Furthermore, he claimed that "the reactions of our Greek Cypriot brothers" were behind the criticism directed to his government.

Özgürgün refused to rule out forming a coalition with any party, but said that he would resign as party leader if his party was not in the first place in the elections. With regards to the Cyprus dispute, he stated that whilst a solution would have been the ultimate aim, talks on a federation had been stalled "because Greek Cypriots refused to accept political equality", and that two states could co-exist on the island in the meanwhile. He proposed a policy of opening Varosha, a ghost quarter of the city of Famagusta that is subject to intercommunal negotiations, under Turkish Cypriot control. He claimed that significant economic development had taken place during his tenure, pointing out to a 30% rise in the minimum wage, and claimed credit for the successful delivery of water from the Northern Cyprus Water Supply Project that took place during his tenure.

The UBP initially used the slogan "Thousands of hearts united in one heart!" (Turkish: Binlerce yürek tek yürek!) for the campaign. At the launch of its formal campaign on 12 December, the party set a target of winning a majority. Subsequent slogans included "Our path is one for service to the people", "Our party is one, our path is one" and "There is only one target, a single-party government".

The UBP announced its "targets and projects for a new period of development" on 18 November. Core policies include the provision of electricity from Turkey to Northern Cyprus via cables under the Mediterranean Sea, increased cooperation with Turkey in searching for natural gas and oil, instituting a general health insurance system, expanding the Ercan Airport, reforming local administrations and building five new hospitals in five districts.

During the campaign, Özgürgün was the subject of controversy after the revelation of his financial details as part of his ongoing divorce case with his wife and his affair with another woman. His wife's lawyer stated that Özgürgün had bought two luxurious cars for his lover, and demanded that these should be included in the division of properties during the divorce. This was followed by the leak of documents submitted about his bank transactions, showing a spending of more than $1,000,000. This was followed by calls for Özgürgün to announce the source of this income. Özgürgün's lawyer called this "an operation on people's perception" and claimed that the source of this income was obvious.

=== Republican Turkish Party (CTP) ===
The CTP saw a renewal of its cadre in the run-up to the election, with established politicians stepping down and younger candidates taking their place. Those who did not sign up to become candidates in the 2018 election included four former prime ministers: Ferdi Sabit Soyer, Sibel Siber, Özkan Yorgancıoğlu and Ömer Kalyoncu. In total, seven sitting MPs did not apply to become candidates. Except for the ten candidates determined at the discretion of the party leader, Erhürman, the party list was determined at a party congress on 18 November. One of the candidates picked by Erhürman, Fikri Toros, had been serving at the time as the head of the Turkish Cypriot Chamber of Commerce and had made statements on the economy espousing a liberal position. This move, seen as part of a "transformation strategy", was controversial within the party, especially in more hard-left circles.

CTP slogans for the election included "This system will change" (Turkish: Bu sistem değişecek) and "We will work to achieve it" (Turkish: Çalışır yaparız). Erhürman promised "social transformation" and "a change of the established order", calling the Özgürgün cabinet the most corrupt of all UBP governments in power to date.

On 15 December, the CTP announced its manifesto for the election, titled "Programme for Economic and Social Development". Core policies include:

- the establishment of a Statistical Office to enable more efficient data-based decision making
- increasing the share of public investments in the GDP from 2% to 5% and forming a Public Investment Evaluation Unit
- restructuring government spending on welfare for "the needy", support for non-governmental organisations and autonomous public institutions to decrease internal government debt
- instituting a constant tax for each tourist staying at a hotel and additional measures to increase self-sufficiency of municipalities
- increased administrative and financial autonomy for local administrations
- restructuring incentives to prioritise entrepreneurship, innovation, research and development; limiting tax breaks to the period during which the investment is being committed
- diversifying tourism by providing incentives for boutique hotels, village redevelopment, investment in new destinations, eco-tourism and agro-tourism
- restructuring the Cyprus Turkish Electricity Authority and creating a Department of Energy
- forming a new agricultural incentive programme based a suitable crops for each region and the promotion of niche products and environmentally friendly practices; adding a performance target a criterion in providing income support to farmers
- building new fishing ports and improving the existing ones
- ensuring affordable plane ticket prices by enforcing the Competition Law; regulating the administration of the Ercan International Airport
- revision of textbooks to make them more Turkish Cypriot in character
- introducing a general health insurance system and allowing choice of doctors
- establishing two new laboratories to control imported food in Ercan and Famagusta

=== People's Party (HP) ===
The HP slogan for the election was "For the administration that we have always desired, the hope of the people is the Party of the People" (Turkish: Hep özlediğimiz yönetim için Halkın umudu, Halkın Partisi). His party being a newcomer to politics, leader Kudret Özersay called the election a "referendum" between "the established order and a new, fairer order". Core policies proposed by the party included the establishment of a health insurance system, the extension of doctors' working hours at public healthcare services, state-subsidised housing projects, increases in benefits, restrictions on property being rented in more stable foreign currency, the introduction of new laws for the accountability of politicians, a new citizenship law, renegotiating the free movement protocol with Turkey to prevent the entry of those with criminal record in Turkey into Northern Cyprus, the opening of Varosha under Turkish Cypriot control, the introduction of a public transport system and night buses and additional anti-corruption measures.

The process of candidate selection in the party officially took place in the Party Assembly. However, the process was controversial as it was secretive, and it was claimed that Özersay personally chose the candidates and presented the list to the Party Assembly.

== Opinion polls ==
Date	Polling firm	CTP	UBP	DP	TDP	BKP + TKP-YG	HP	YDP	Others	Lead
7 Jan 2018	Election	20.9	35.6	7.8	8.6	2.7	17.1	7.0	0.3	14.7
18–20 Nov 2017	Gezici	22.1	34.2	4.2	13.7	1.8	18.2	5.1	0.7	12.1
Oct 2017	Gezici	22.3	31.1	4.8	11.2	2.3	21.3	6.3	0.8	8.8
Sep 2017	DETAY	21.2	30.8	3.4	11.2	2.6	23.7	4.8	1.8	7.1
13–15 May 2017	Gezici	18.1	23.4	7.8	10.2	3.4	30.8	4.8	1.5	7.4
April 2017	DETAY	20.9	38.0	7.7	11.0	3.2	14.0	3.9	1.7	17.1
February 2017	DETAY	19.8	36.1	8.9	9.4	3.2	16.9	3.3	1.6	16.3
28 July 2013	Parliamentary election	38.4	27.3	23.2	7.4	3.2	—N/a	—N/a	0.6	11.1

== Results ==
Party	Votes	%	Seats	+/–
National Unity Party	1,920,517	35.61	21	+7
Republican Turkish Party	1,129,938	20.95	12	–9
People's Party	920,490	17.07	9	New
Communal Democracy Party	466,369	8.65	3	+1
Democratic Party	421,792	7.82	3	–9
Rebirth Party	376,826	6.99	2	New
Alliance for Change and Liberation (TKP-YG+BKP)	143,863	2.67	0	0
Nationalist Democracy Party	7,099	0.13	0	New
Independents	6,955	0.13	0	0
Total	5,393,849	100.00	50	0
Valid votes	112,004	88.86		
Invalid/blank votes	14,036	11.14		
Total votes	126,040	100.00		
Registered voters/turnout	190,553	66.14		
Source: YSK

=== By district ===
District	UBP	CTP	HP	TDP	DP	YDP	TKP-YG	MDP	IND
Gazimağusa	37.2	20.7	16.5	5.8	7.9	8.5	3.2	0.2	0.1
Girne	35.6	21.1	18.1	9.3	7.0	6.8	1.8	0.2	0.1
Güzelyurt	35.7	20.7	15.6	8.7	10.1	5.7	3.2	0.2	0.1
İskele	38.5	17.1	14.7	5.4	7.6	12.7	3.7	0.2	0.1
Lefkoşa	33.5	22.2	18.6	11.1	7.3	4.7	2.3	0.2	0.2
Lefke	32.8	23.4	13.4	11.1	11.9	3.7	3.4	0.1	0.1
Source: Yeniduzen

== Reactions and aftermath ==
The results were considered a victory for the UBP specifically and for the right-wing in Northern Cyprus in general. The total share of votes obtained by left-wing parties saw a major decrease. The election produced the first six-party parliament in the history of Northern Cyprus and yielded the greatest number of female MPs ever elected to the parliament in the country, forming 18% of the 15th Parliament of Northern Cyprus at 9 MPs. This was seen as a positive result achieved thanks to the gender quota introduced before the election.

According to Kıbrıs Postası, the UBP "renewed trust" in the election. Party leader Özgürgün thanked the voters in a victory address, which was also attended by the party's historic leader, Derviş Eroğlu. He said that his party would continue working "in unity" for "grand projects".

CTP's major losses in the election met with "great disappointment" in the party and were considered "catastrophic" by some commentators. Party leader Erhürman said that the party respected the results but found them "undesirable", accepting that the election had not been successful for the CTP. He ruled out forming a grand coalition with the UBP and said that "this was only a beginning for the struggle", which would "continue tomorrow".

The HP achieved a "remarkable" result for a new party, but it was commented that the party had not met its own expectations and thus viewed the results with dismay. Despite this, the HP was described as one of the winners of the election. Party leader Özersay stated that the party viewed the results as "not bright for the future of the country" as the voters had voted for the "continuation of the status quo". Özersay stated that his party would keep working to encourage voters to mobilise for change and that his party would not be a part of this status quo. The HP ruled out any coalition talks with the UBP.

The Rebirth Party (YDP), a party dominated by the Turkish settlers in Northern Cyprus, was also considered as one of the winners in the election. Kıbrıs Postası called the share of votes achieved by the YDP "a surprise". YDP leader Arıklı also called his party's results a "great success".

Kıbrıs stated that the government formation process would yield either a three-party coalition of the UBP with two of the smaller parties or a re-run of the election.

The office of Nicos Anastasiades, the President of the Republic of Cyprus, released a statement stating that they hoped that the results of the election would not lead to "further hardening of [the Turkish Cypriot community's] positions and its intransigence" in relation to a solution for the Cyprus problem.

Recep Tayyip Erdoğan, President of Turkey and Binali Yıldırım, Prime Minister of Turkey, called Özgürgün to congratulate him on the election results.

However, Özgürgün's UBP was ousted from power and a new coalition government was formed by the Republican Turkish Party (CTP), the People's Party, Communal Democracy Party and the Democratic Party, with CTP leader Tufan Erhürman becoming prime minister.
