= Sucuoğlu cabinet =

The Sucuoğlu cabinet ruled Northern Cyprus from 2021 to 2022. The current makeup of the Council of Ministers, the 2nd Sucuoğlu cabinet, which replaced the 1st Sucuoğlu cabinet, was appointed on 21 February 2022 by the president Ersin Tatar. The cabinet was led by Prime Minister of Northern Cyprus Faiz Sucuoğlu and consists of 10 ministers formed by a coalition of the National Unity Party (UBP), the Democratic Party (DP) and the Rebirth Party (YDP). UBP got 8 and DP and YDP got 1 minister each.

== First formation ==
The First Sucuoğlu cabinet, was formed in November 2021 and was a minority coalition government of the National Unity Party (UBP) and the Democratic Party (DP). It functioned as a caretaker government until the snap election.

== Second formation ==
Following the 2022 Northern Cypriot parliamentary election, the second cabinet was formed:

| Title | Name | Period | Party |
|---|---|---|---|
| Prime Minister | Faiz Sucuoğlu | 21 February 2022– | UBP |
| Deputy Prime Minister and Minister of Tourism, Culture, Youth and Environment | Fikri Ataoğlu | 21 February 2022– | DP |
| Minister of Public Works and Transport | Erhan Arıklı | 21 February 2022– | YDP |
| Minister of National Education | Nazım Çavuşoğlu | 21 February 2022– | UBP |
| Minister of Finance | Sunat Atun | 21 February 2022– | UBP |
| Minister of Interior | Ünal Üstel | 21 February 2022– | UBP |
| Minister of Foreign Affairs | Hasan Taçoy | 21 February 2022– | UBP |
| Minister of Health | Ali Pilli | 21 February 2022– | UBP |
| Minister of Agriculture and Natural Resources | Dursun Oğuz | 21 February 2022– | UBP |
| Minister of Labour and Social Security | Oğuzhan Hasipoğlu | 21 February 2022– | UBP |

== See also ==
- List of cabinets of Northern Cyprus
