= Tatar cabinet =

== Cabinet ==
The current council, Tatar cabinet, which replaced the Erhürman cabinet is appointed on 22 May 2019 by the president, Mustafa Akıncı. The cabinet consists of 10 ministers formed by a coalition of the National Unity Party (UBP) and People's Party (HP). UBP got 7 and HP got 3 ministers in the cabinet. HP withdrew from the coalition on 6 October 2020. However, the official resignation process of the ministers and the cabinet did not proceed due to the election process.

Title	Name	Period	Party
Prime Minister	Ersin Tatar	22 May 2019–23 October 2020^{de jure} 22 May 2019–9 December 2020^{de facto}	UBP
Deputy Prime Minister and Minister of Foreign Affairs	Kudret Özersay	22 May 2019–9 December 2020	HP
Minister of National Education and Culture	Nazım Çavuşoğlu	22 May 2019–9 December 2020	UBP
Minister of Finance	Olgun Amcaoğlu	22 May 2019–9 December 2020	UBP
Minister of Interior	Ayşegül Baybars	22 May 2019–9 December 2020	HP
Minister of Economy and Energy	Hasan Taçoy	22 May 2019–9 December 2020	UBP
Minister of Health	Ali Pilli	22 May 2019–9 December 2020	UBP
Minister of Agriculture and Natural Resources	Dursun Oğuz	22 May 2019–9 December 2020	UBP
Minister of Public Works and Transport	Tolga Atakan	22 May 2019–9 December 2020	HP
Minister of Tourism and Environment	Ünal Üstel	22 May 2019–19 June 2020	UBP
Minister of Tourism and Environment	Kutlu Evren	19 June 2020–9 December 2020	UBP
Minister of Labour and Social Security	Faiz Sucuoğlu	22 May 2019–9 December 2020	UBP

== See also ==
- List of cabinets of Northern Cyprus
