= 2022 Northern Cypriot parliamentary election =

- 23 January 2022
- All 50 seats in the Assembly of the Republic; 26 seats needed for a majority
Party	Leader	Vote %	Seats	+/–
UBP	Faiz Sucuoğlu	39.54	24	+3
CTP	Tufan Erhürman	32.04	18	+6
DP	Fikri Ataoğlu	7.41	3	0
HP	Kudret Özersay	6.68	3	−6
YDP	Erhan Arıklı	6.39	2	0
This lists parties that won seats. See the complete results below.
Seats won by constituency
Prime Minister before	Prime Minister after
Faiz Sucuoğlu; UBP	Faiz Sucuoğlu; UBP

Snap parliamentary elections were held in Northern Cyprus on 23 January 2022. Going into the election, the government was led by Prime Minister Faiz Sucuoğlu of the National Unity Party (UBP). The Sucuoğlu cabinet, was formed in November 2021 and was a minority coalition government of the National Unity Party (UBP) and the Democratic Party (DP). It functioned as a caretaker government until the snap election.

The National Unity Party won 24 seats, gaining three compared to the previous elections in 2018. The main opposition party, the Republican Turkish Party won 18 seats, gaining six. Three other parties won seats; the Democratic Party and the People's Party both won three seats, while the Rebirth Party won two. The Communal Democracy Party lost all the seats it held.

== Electoral system ==
The fifty members of the Assembly were elected by proportional representation in six multi-member constituencies with an electoral threshold of 5%. Voters can vote for either a party list or individual candidates. If they choose the latter, they may cast as many votes as there are seats in each constituency. Voters are not limited to their constituency if they wish to vote for individual candidates; they may vote for candidates in any constituency so long as the total number of votes cast is between 24 and 50.

== Results ==
Party	Votes	%	Seats	+/–
National Unity Party	2,025,768	39.61	24	+3
Republican Turkish Party	1,631,758	31.91	18	+6
Democratic Party	379,658	7.42	3	0
People's Party	342,263	6.69	3	–6
Rebirth Party	329,497	6.44	2	0
Communal Democracy Party	225,218	4.40	0	–3
Independence Path	99,086	1.94	0	New
Communal Liberation Party New Forces	79,626	1.56	0	0
Independents	810	0.02	0	0
Total	5,113,684	100.00	50	0
Valid votes	105,412	90.09		
Invalid/blank votes	11,593	9.91		
Total votes	117,005	100.00		
Registered voters/turnout	203,792	57.41		
Source: YSK

=== Seats by district ===
District	UBP	CTP	DP	HP	YDP	Total
Gazimağusa	6	4	1	1	1	13
Girne	5	4	1	1	0	11
Güzelyurt	2	1	0	0	0	3
İskele	3	2	0	0	0	5
Lefke	1	1	0	0	0	2
Lefkoşa	7	6	1	1	1	16
Source: Yeniduzen

== Government formation ==
On 8 February President Ersin Tatar gave Faiz Sucuoğlu the task of forming a government, for which he had fifteen days to do so. On 19 February Sucuoğlu stated an agreement had been reached to form a UBP–DP–YDP coalition government. The government will consist of eight ministers from the UBP, while the DP and YDP will have one each. He presented his cabinet list to the president on 21 February.

On 3 March the Assembly approved the government by a vote of 29–20, with one CTP member absent.
