= Özdil Nami =

British-born Turkish Cypriot politician

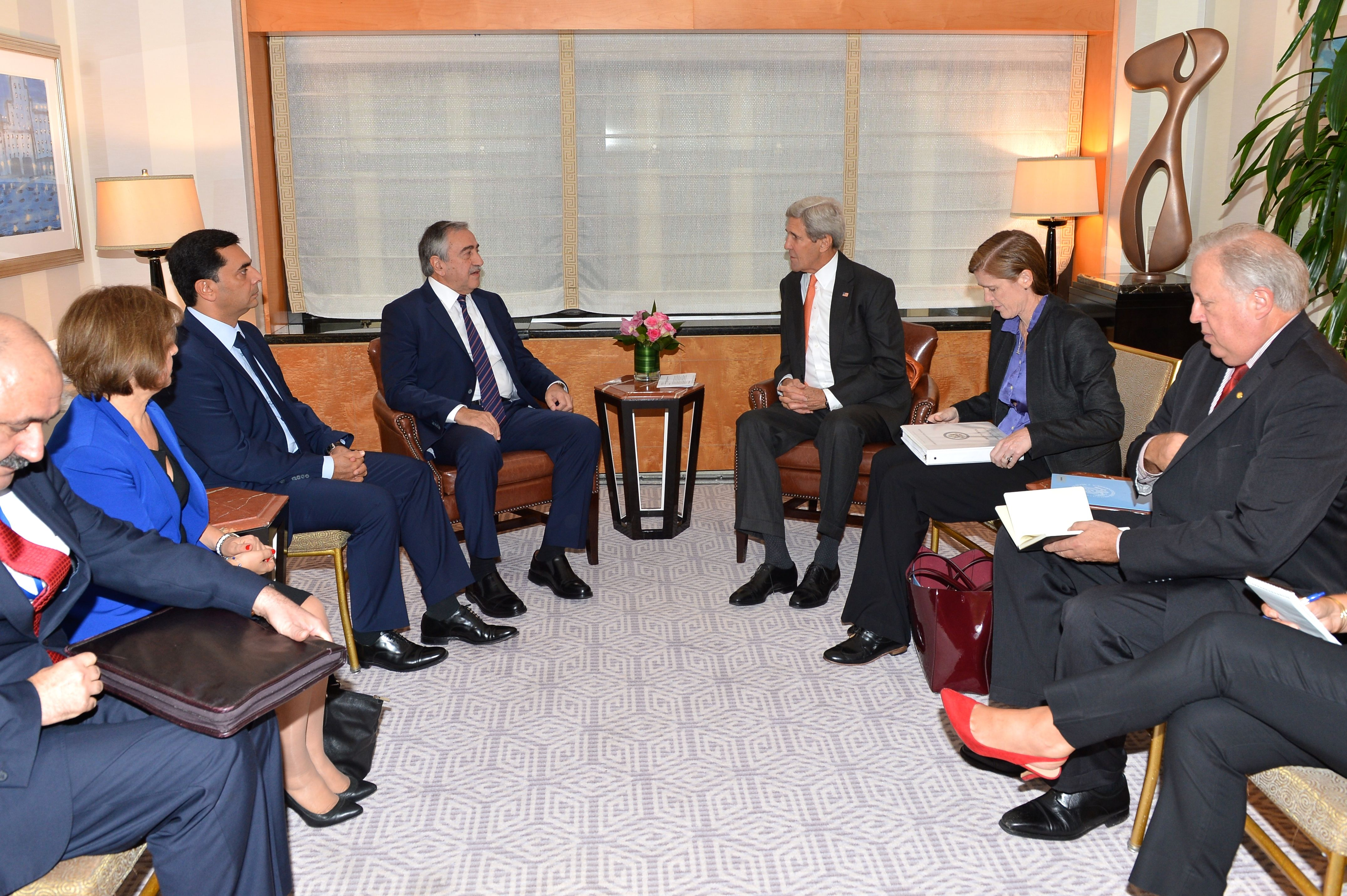
- Nami (third from the left) meeting US Secretary of State John Kerry as part of the team of Akıncı

Minister of Economy and Energy
- In office 2 February 2018 – 22 May 2019
- Prime Minister: Tufan Erhürman

Minister of Foreign Affairs
- In office 1 September 2013 – 14 May 2015
- Prime Minister: Özkan Yorgancıoğlu
- Preceded by: Kutlay Erk
- Succeeded by: Teberrüken Uluçay (acting)

Personal details
- Born: May 23, 1967 (age 59) London, United Kingdom
- Party: Republican Turkish Party
- Education: Boğaziçi University

Özdil Nami (born 23 May 1967) is a British-born Turkish Cypriot politician. He has served as the Minister of Foreign Affairs of Northern Cyprus and the Turkish Cypriot Special Representative in the negotiations to solve the Cyprus dispute. He served as the Minister of Economy and Energy of Northern Cyprus between 2018 and 2019.

Nami was born in London on 23 May 1967. He studied business in the Boğaziçi University Faculty of Economics and Administrative Sciences, in Istanbul, Turkey, graduating in 1988, and went on to complete a master's degree in finance in the University of California, Berkeley in 1991.

After his return to Cyprus, he started to work in the company of his family, Erdil & Sons Ltd as a director. Between 1993 and 1997, he delivered business lectures in the Eastern Mediterranean University, Near East University and the European University of Lefke. He was appointed in 1997 as an adviser to the President Rauf Denktaş on political analysis and took part in the negotiations to solve the Cyprus dispute until 2000. He then served as a Councillor at the Turkish Cypriot Chamber of Commerce in 2000 and 2001 and as the Chairperson of Cyprus Turkish Businessmen Association between 2001 and 2003.

In the 2003 parliamentary election, he was elected as a member of the parliament for the Republican Turkish Party (CTP), representing the Lefkoşa District. In January 2005, he was chosen to represent Turkish Cypriots at the Parliamentary Assembly of the Council of Europe and in February 2005. He was re-elected to the same position in the parliament in 2005 and appointed to the position of the Turkish Cypriot Special Representative for the negotiations under President Mehmet Ali Talat, serving in that position until Talat's replacement by Derviş Eroğlu in 2010. He was re-elected as a CTP MP for the Lefkoşa District in the 2009 and 2013 parliamentary elections.

On 1 September 2013, he was appointed as the Minister of Foreign Affairs of Northern Cyprus in the Yorgancıoğlu cabinet. On 11 May 2015, he resigned from his position as a minister after being appointed by the newly elected President Mustafa Akıncı as his Special Representative in the negotiations; Nami had already taken over this position on 4 May.

On 2 February 2018, he assumed the role of the Minister of Economy and Energy in the Erhürman cabinet.
