= Council of Ministers (Northern Cyprus) =

Executive authority in Northern Cyprus

The Council of Ministers (Turkish: Bakanlar Kurulu) is the executive branch of the government of the unrecognized state Northern Cyprus, consisting of ministers. The council is chaired by the prime minister of Northern Cyprus and the ministers head executive departments of the government. The president of Northern Cyprus is reserved the right to chair the Council of Ministers, albeit without voting. The maximum number of ministries, as defined by the constitution, is ten.

The Council of Ministers is appointed by the prime minister, and the program of the government needs to be read out in the Assembly of the Republic within a week of the appointment. The cabinet then needs to receive a vote of confidence by the majority of the members of the Assembly. A vote of no confidence can be initiated after three months has elapsed, by nine members of the Assembly.

== Cabinet ==
The current council, 2nd Sucuoğlu cabinet, replaced the 1st Sucuoğlu cabinet was appointed on 21 February 2022 by the president, Ersin Tatar. The cabinet consisted of 10 ministers formed by a coalition of the National Unity Party (UBP), the Democratic Party (DP) and the Rebirth Party (YDP). UBP received 8 and DP and YDP received 1 minister each.

Title	Name	Period	Party
Prime Minister	Faiz Sucuoğlu	21 February 2022–	UBP
Deputy Prime Minister and Minister of Tourism, Culture, Youth and Environment	Fikri Ataoğlu	21 February 2022–	DP
Minister of Public Works and Transport	Erhan Arıklı	21 February 2022–	YDP
Minister of National Education	Nazım Çavuşoğlu	21 February 2022–	UBP
Minister of Finance	Sunat Atun	21 February 2022–	UBP
Minister of Interior	Ünal Üstel	21 February 2022–	UBP
Minister of Foreign Affairs	Hasan Taçoy	21 February 2022–	UBP
Minister of Health	Ali Pilli	21 February 2022–	UBP
Minister of Agriculture and Natural Resources	Dursun Oğuz	21 February 2022–	UBP
Minister of Labour and Social Security	Oğuzhan Hasipoğlu	21 February 2022–	UBP

== See also ==
- List of cabinets of Northern Cyprus
