= Erhürman cabinet =

Government of northern Cyprus 2018-19

Erhürman cabinet was the government of Northern Cyprus between 2 February 2018 and 22 May 2019. It replaced the Özgürgün cabinet and consisted of 10 ministers formed by a coalition of the Republican Turkish Party (CTP), People's Party (HP), Communal Democracy Party (TDP) and Democratic Party (DP), which is a first in the history of TRNC cabinets. CTP got 4, HP got 3, TDP got 2 and DP got 2 ministers in the cabinet.

Title	Name	Period	Party
Prime Minister	Tufan Erhürman	2 February 2018–22 May 2019	CTP
Minister of Agriculture and Natural Resources	Erkut Şahali	2 February 2018–22 May 2019	CTP
Minister of Health	Filiz Besim	2 February 2018–22 May 2019	CTP
Minister of Economy and Energy	Özdil Nami	2 February 2018–22 May 2019	CTP
Deputy Prime Minister and Minister of Foreign Affairs	Kudret Özersay	2 February 2018–22 May 2019	HP
Minister of Interior	Ayşegül Baybars	2 February 2018–22 May 2019	HP
Minister of Public Works and Transport	Tolga Atakan	2 February 2018–22 May 2019	HP
Minister of Finance	Serdar Denktaş	2 February 2018–22 May 2019	DP
Minister of Tourism and Environment	Fikri Ataoğlu	2 February 2018–22 May 2019	DP
Minister of National Education and Culture	Cemal Özyiğit	2 February 2018–22 May 2019	TDP
Minister of Labour and Social Security	Zeki Çeler	2 February 2018–22 May 2019	TDP
