= Freedom and Reform Party =

Freedom and Reform Party Özgürlük ve Reform Partisi
- Leader: Turgay Avcı
- Founded: 2006
- Dissolved: 2010
- Split from: UBP
- Merged into: UBP
- Headquarters: North Nicosia, Northern Cyprus
- Ideology: Liberalism
- Parliament: 0 / 50

Website
- www.ozgurparti.org

The Freedom and Reform Party (Turkish: Özgürlük ve Reform Partisi, ÖRP) was a liberal political party in the Turkish Republic of Northern Cyprus.

The party was formed in 2006 by four former MP's from the National Unity Party (UBP) and the Democratic Party (DP). This party served as the junior coalition partner in the former de facto TRNC Government consisting of itself and the Republican Turkish Party led by Mehmet Ali Talat.

Party Leader Turgay Avcı served in the TRNC Cabinet as Deputy Prime Minister and Minister of Foreign Affairs.
