= Tufan Erhürman =

President of Northern Cyprus since 2025

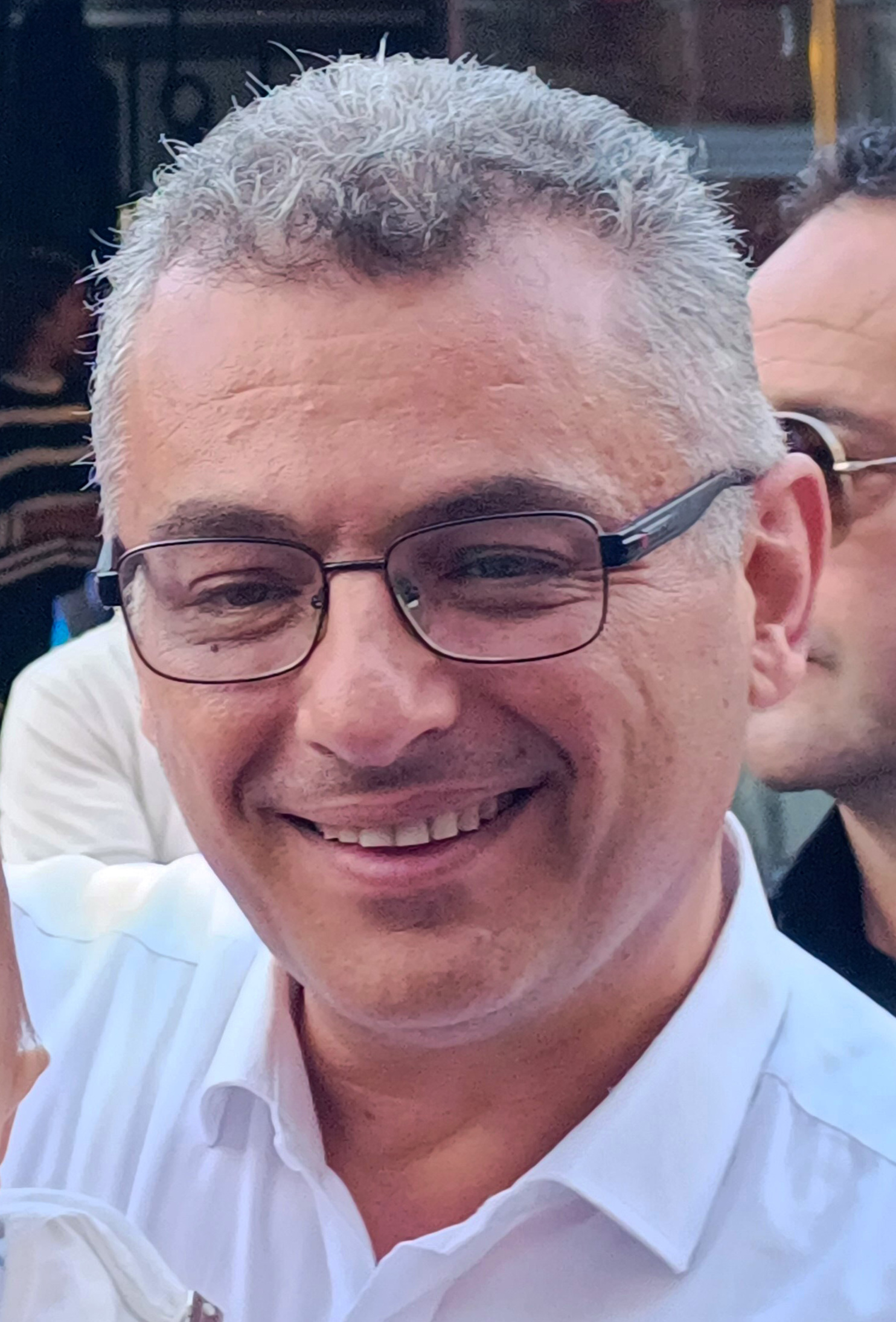

6th President of Northern Cyprus
- Incumbent
- Assumed office 24 October 2025
- Prime Minister: Ünal Üstel
- Preceded by: Ersin Tatar

Prime Minister of Northern Cyprus
- In office 2 February 2018 – 22 May 2019
- President: Mustafa Akıncı
- Deputy: Kudret Özersay
- Preceded by: Hüseyin Özgürgün
- Succeeded by: Ersin Tatar

Leader of the Republican Turkish Party
- In office 13 November 2016 – 24 October 2025
- Preceded by: Mehmet Ali Talat
- Succeeded by: Sıla Usar İncirli

Member of the Assembly of Republic
- Incumbent
- Assumed office 28 July 2013
- Constituency: Lefkoşa (2013, 2018)

Personal details
- Born: 11 September 1970 (age 56) Nicosia, Cyprus
- Citizenship: Cypriot
- Party: Republican Turkish (until 2025)
- Spouse: Nilden Bektaş Erhürman
- Children: 1
- Education: Türk Maarif Koleji
- Alma mater: Ankara University (LLB, LLM, PhD)
- Website: tufanerhurman.org

Tufan Erhürman (born 11 September 1970) is a Turkish Cypriot academic, lawyer, diplomat, and politician who has been the 6th president of Northern Cyprus since 2025. A scholar in public law by profession, he served in the negotiations to solve the Cyprus dispute between 2008 and 2010. He previously worked for the Ministry of Justice of Turkey between 1999 and 2004 and worked for the establishment of the position of ombudsman in Turkey.

He served as the leader of the Republican Turkish Party between 2016 and 2025, until his ascension to the Presidency. He held the office of Prime Minister beginning January 2018 as the leader of a four-party coalition. The coalition government resigned on 9 May 2019, with Erhürman continuing as Prime Minister until the office was taken over by Ersin Tatar on 22 May 2019. He was elected president of Northern Cyprus in a landslide in the 2025 Northern Cypriot presidential election.

== Education ==
Erhürman finished his secondary education in Türk Maarif Koleji. He was then enrolled to study law at Ankara University in 1988. He received his master's degree and doctorate from Ankara University as well. His 2001 PhD thesis was on the "Non-Juridical Inspection of the Authority and the Ombudsman".

== Academic career ==
Erhürman lectured on public law at the Ankara University, Middle East Technical University and Hacettepe University between 1995 and 2001. He then lectured at the Eastern Mediterranean University from 2001 to 2006, and from 2008 to 2013. Erhürman also lectured at the Near East University between the years of 2006 and 2008.

== Political career ==
Erhürman became involved in the negotiations to solve the Cyprus dispute under President Mehmet Ali Talat between 2008 and 2010.

He ran for a Nicosia seat at the Assembly of the Republic in the 2013 elections and became a Member of Parliament as a candidate of the Republican Turkish Party-United Forces. He worked extensively to change the constitution where 23 changes were agreed by all 4 parties which were being represented in the parliament at that time. However, 62.3% of the voters rejected the new constitution in the 2014 referendum. He became the Secretary General of the Republican Turkish Party-United Forces.

On 13 November 2016, Erhürman became the leader of the Republican Turkish Party and thus of the main opposition.

He was reelected as a Member of the Parliament during the 2018 snap elections, however he could not prevent his party from losing 9 seats. On 19 January 2018, negotiations started to form a coalition between 4 parties, the Republican Turkish Party, the People's Party, the Democratic Party and the Communal Democracy Party, ultimately succeeding in the formation of the Erhürman cabinet.

On 19 October 2025, Erhürman defeated incumbent president Ersin Tatar in the 2025 Northern Cypriot presidential election, winning 62.76% of the vote.

== Political positions ==
Erhürman has stated his support for the reunification of Cyprus under a federal model. However he has also stated that he would not go down such a route without the approval of the government of Turkey.

== Electoral history ==
=== 2025 Northern Cypriot presidential election ===
Candidate	Party	Votes	%
Tufan Erhürman	Republican Turkish Party	87,137	62.76
Ersin Tatar	Independent	49,714	35.81
Arif Salih Kırdağ	Independent	459	0.33
Osman Zorba	Cyprus Socialist Party	443	0.32
İbrahim Yazıcı	Independent	330	0.24
Mehmet Hasgüler	Independent	300	0.22
Hüseyin Gürlek	Independent	257	0.19
Ahmet Boran	Independent	199	0.14
Total		138,839	100.00
Valid votes		138,839	98.04
Invalid/blank votes		2,776	1.96
Total votes		141,615	100.00
Registered voters/turnout		218,313	64.87
Source: Cyprus Post

=== 2020 Northern Cypriot presidential election ===
Candidate	Party	First round		Second round	
Candidate	Party	Votes	%	Votes	%
Ersin Tatar	National Unity Party	35,825	32.35	67,322	51.69
Mustafa Akıncı	Independent	33,053	29.84	62,910	48.31
Tufan Erhürman	Republican Turkish Party	24,008	21.68		
Kudret Özersay	Independent	6,356	5.74		
Erhan Arıklı	Rebirth Party	5,937	5.36		
Serdar Denktaş	Independent	4,653	4.20		
Fuat Türköz Çiner	Nationalist Democracy Party	327	0.30		
Arif Salih Kırdağ	Independent	282	0.25		
Alpan Uz	Independent	156	0.14		
Ahmet Boran	Independent	83	0.07		
Mustafa Ulaş	Independent	69	0.06		
Total		110,749	100.00	130,232	100.00
Valid votes		110,749	95.66	130,232	97.24
Invalid/blank votes		5,027	4.34	3,699	2.76
Total votes		115,776	100.00	133,931	100.00
Registered voters/turnout		198,867	58.22	199,029	67.29

Political offices
Preceded by Hüseyin Özgürgün	Prime Minister of Northern Cyprus; 2018–2019	Succeeded by Ersin Tatar
Preceded by Ersin Tatar	President of Northern Cyprus; 2025–present	Incumbent
