= Ali Pilli =

Turkish Cypriot politician (born 1955)

Minister of Health of Northern Cyprus
- Incumbent
- Assumed office 22 May 2019
- President: Ersin Tatar
- Preceded by: Filiz Besim

Personal details
- Born: 1955 (age 70–71) Paphos, Cyprus
- Party: National Unity Party
- Children: 1
- Education: Çukurova University
- Alma mater: Medicine

Ali Pilli (born 1955) is a Turkish Cypriot doctor and politician. He is the minister of health of the 41st government of Northern Cyprus. He is from Paphos.

== Early life and career ==
Ali Pilli was born on 1955 in the village Falya of Paphos. He completed his primary education in Falya and secondary education and high school in Paphos. After graduating from Çukurova University Medical School he received the title of medical doctor. After the 2013 general elections Pilli was appointed as the Minister of Health.
