= Independence Path =

Left-wing political party operating in the Turkish Republic of Northern Cyprus

Independence Path Bağımsızlık Yolu
- Abbreviation: BY
- General Secretary: Umut Ersoy
- Founded: 21 June 2018
- Headquarters: Lefkoşa
- Ideology: Socialism; United Cyprus
- Political position: Left-wing
- Colours: Black; Purple; Green; Red
- Slogan: Independent Cyprus. All Peoples are Brothers! (Turkish: Bağımsız Kıbrıs Bütün Halklar Kardeştir!)
- Assembly of the Republic: 0 / 50

Website
- www.bagimsizlikyolu.org

Independence Path (Turkish: Bağımsızlık Yolu, BY) is a left-wing political party operating in the Turkish Republic of Northern Cyprus. The formation, which previously operated as a non-governmental organization, became a party in 2018. In 2022, the party participated in its first parliamentary election.

== Election results ==
Assembly of the Republic
Election	Votes			Seats		Role
Election	#	%	Rank	#	±	Role
2022	99,086	1.94	7th	0 / 50	New	extra-parliamentary
