= President of Northern Cyprus =

Head of state

President of the Turkish Republic of Northern Cyprus
- Kuzey Kıbrıs Türk Cumhuriyeti Cumhurbaşkanı (Turkish)
- Emblem of the Presidency

- Presidential Standard

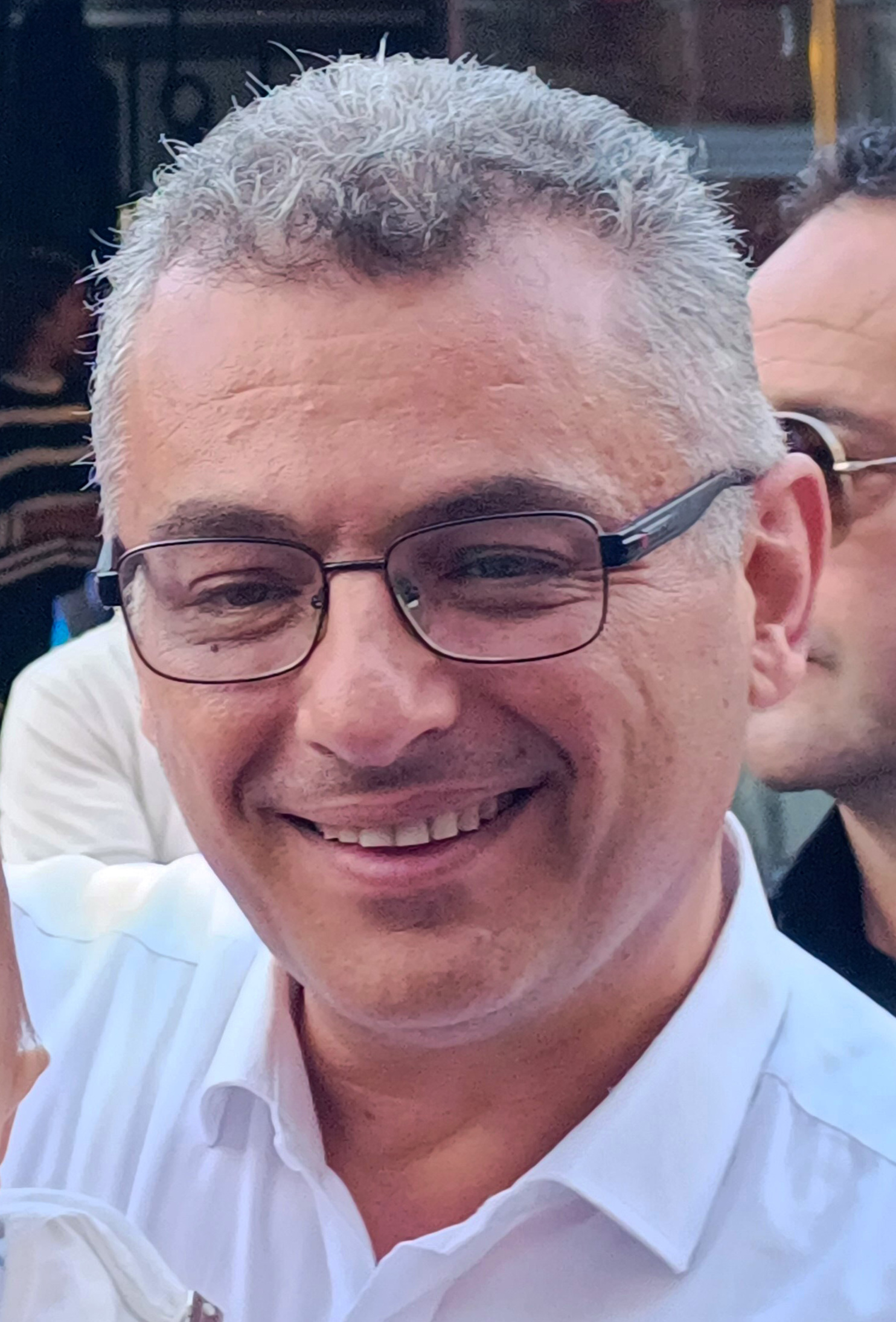
- Incumbent; Tufan Erhürman since 24 October 2025
- Style: Mr. President (informal); The Honourable (formal); His Excellency (formal, diplomatic)
- Residence: Presidential palace North Nicosia
- Term length: Five years, renewable once
- Inaugural holder: Rauf Denktaş
- Formation: 15 November 1983; 42 years ago
- Salary: ₺411,320 monthly (2025)
- Website: www.kktcb.org

The president of Northern Cyprus is the head of state of the self-proclaimed Turkish Republic of Northern Cyprus. Rauf Denktaş was the first and founding president of Northern Cyprus, and retired in 2005. His position was taken over by Mehmet Ali Talat, followed by Derviş Eroğlu, then Mustafa Akıncı, Ersin Tatar, and the current president, Tufan Erhürman.

The president is elected every five years. Presidential elections are held in two rounds if no candidate gains more than 50% of the votes in the first round. It is necessary that the president is originated from the island of Cyprus. The president must have lived in the country for five years, received secondary education and be over 30 years old.

The presidency is not a ceremonial position in the semi-presidential political system of Northern Cyprus. The president reserves the right to dismiss the Assembly of the Republic in case a government cannot be formed within sixty days or three successive governments receive votes of no confidence. They also can preside over the Council of Ministers if they wish to do so, approve the appointments of the judges and president of the Supreme Court and have the right to send laws approved by the Assembly of the Republic to the Supreme Court. The president has also traditionally been the chief negotiator for the resolution of the Cyprus dispute and been responsible for the foreign relations of Northern Cyprus.

The president is represented by the speaker of the Assembly of the Republic when the president is abroad.

The most recent presidential election was held on 19 October 2025. Tufan Erhürman is the current president.

== List of officeholders ==
History of the office holders follows.

№	Portrait	Name (Birth–Death)	Term of office	
№	Portrait	Name (Birth–Death)	Inaugurated	Left office
1		Fazıl Küçük (1906–1984)	16 August 1960	18 February 1973
2		Rauf Denktaş (1924–2012)	18 February 1973	15 July 1974 (deposed)

=== President of the Turkish Federated State of Cyprus (1975–1983) ===
The Turkish Federated State of Cyprus was intended as an autonomous part of Cyprus, but was rejected by the government of the Republic of Cyprus.

No.	Portrait	Name (Birth–Death)	Elected	Term of office			Political party
No.	Portrait	Name (Birth–Death)	Elected	Took office	Left office	Duration	Political party
1		Rauf Denktaş (1924–2012)	1976; 1981	15 July 1974	15 November 1983	8 years, 275 days	Independent (until 11 October 1975) National Unity Party (11 October 1975 onwards)

=== Presidents of the Turkish Republic of Northern Cyprus (1983–present) ===
This list gives all presidents after Northern Cyprus' unilateral declaration of independence in 1983, which followed after the refusal of the government of the Republic of Cyprus to recognize the Turkish Federated State of Cyprus.

No.	Portrait	Name (Birth–Death)	Elected	Term of office			Political party
No.	Portrait	Name (Birth–Death)	Elected	Took office	Left office	Duration	Political party
1		Rauf Denktaş (1924–2012)	1985	15 November 1983	15 March 1990	6 years, 120 days	National Unity Party
—		Hakkı Atun (born 1935) (acting)	—	15 March 1990	25 April 1990	41 days	National Unity Party
(1)		Rauf Denktaş (1924–2012)	1990; 1995; 2000	25 April 1990	24 April 2005	14 years, 364 days	National Unity Party
2		Mehmet Ali Talat (born 1952)	2005	24 April 2005	23 April 2010	4 years, 364 days	Republican Turkish Party
3		Derviş Eroğlu (born 1938)	2010	23 April 2010	30 April 2015	5 years, 7 days	National Unity Party
4		Mustafa Akıncı (born 1947)	2015	30 April 2015	23 October 2020	5 years, 176 days	Independent
5		Ersin Tatar (born 1960)	2020	23 October 2020	24 October 2025	5 years, 1 day	National Unity Party
6		Tufan Erhürman (born 1970)	2025	24 October 2025	Incumbent	360 days	Republican Turkish Party

== Latest election ==
Candidate	Party	Votes	%
Tufan Erhürman	Republican Turkish Party	87,137	62.76
Ersin Tatar	Independent	49,714	35.81
Arif Salih Kırdağ	Independent	458	0.33
Osman Zorba	Cyprus Socialist Party	443	0.32
İbrahim Yazıcı	Independent	331	0.24
Mehmet Hasgüler	Independent	300	0.22
Hüseyin Gürlek	Independent	258	0.19
Ahmet Boran	Independent	198	0.14
Total		138,839	100.00
Valid votes		138,839	98.12
Invalid/blank votes		2,665	1.88
Total votes		141,504	100.00
Registered voters/turnout		218,313	64.82
Source: YSK

== See also ==
- Politics of Northern Cyprus
- Prime Minister of Northern Cyprus
