= Turkish Cypriot Chamber of Commerce =

Turkish Cypriot Chamber of Commerce (Turkish: Kıbrıs Türk Ticaret Odası) is a chamber of commerce and was founded in Nicosia in 1958 and represents businesses in the Turkish Republic of Northern Cyprus. It has around 3500 members as of 2025 and membership is obligatory for Northern Cypriot businesses.
