= Mustafa Akıncı =

President of Northern Cyprus from 2015 to 2020

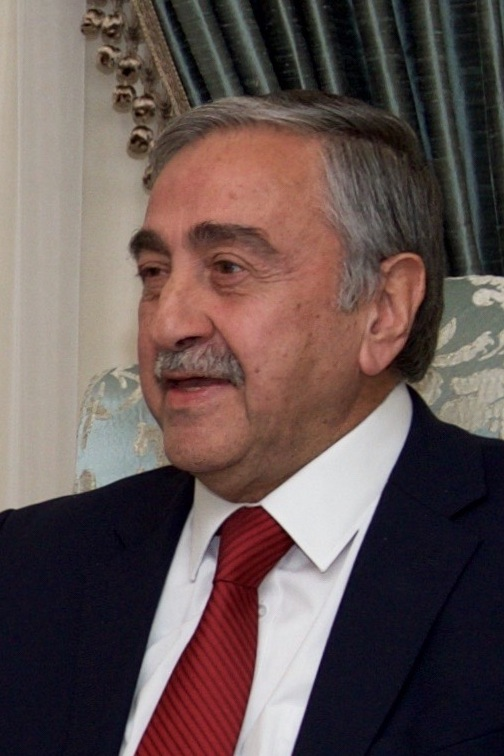
- Akıncı in 2015

4th President of Northern Cyprus
- In office 30 April 2015 – 23 October 2020
- Prime Minister: Özkan Yorgancıoğlu; Ömer Kalyoncu; Hüseyin Özgürgün; Tufan Erhürman; Ersin Tatar
- Preceded by: Derviş Eroğlu
- Succeeded by: Ersin Tatar

Deputy Prime Minister of Northern Cyprus
- In office 30 December 1998 – 8 June 2001
- Preceded by: Serdar Denktaş
- Succeeded by: Salih Coşar

Mayor of North Nicosia
- In office 1976–1990
- Preceded by: Ziver Kemal
- Succeeded by: Burhan Yetkili

Personal details
- Born: 28 December 1947 (age 78) Limassol, British Cyprus
- Party: Communal Democracy; Independent
- Spouse: Meral Akıncı
- Education: Middle East Technical; University
- Profession: Architect

Mustafa Akıncı (Turkish: [mustaˈfa akɯnˈdʒɯ]; born 28 December 1947) is a Turkish Cypriot politician who was the president of Northern Cyprus from April 2015 until October 2020.

An architect by profession, Akıncı in 1976 became the first elected mayor of the Nicosia Turkish Municipality in Northern Cyprus, at the age of 28. He defeated a candidate endorsed by President Rauf Denktaş as the candidate of the Communal Liberation Party (TKP). He held this position for an uninterrupted term of 14 years until 1990, leading several projects for the city that won him international awards including the Aga Khan Award for Architecture and collaborating with his Greek Cypriot counterpart. Meanwhile, he rose to prominence and gained influence within his party, first becoming Secretary General and then leader in 1987. He served as a member of the Assembly of the Republic between 1993 and 2009 and as the Deputy Prime Minister and Minister of State between 1999 and 2001. His leadership of the TKP ended in 2001. He established the Peace and Democracy Movement in 2003 and served as its leader.

Akıncı is a long-standing advocate of the reunification of Cyprus and has opposed Turkey's increasing influence in Northern Cyprus. His stance has seen strong opposition from the Turkish government in Ankara, which supported his rival Ersin Tatar in the 2020 presidential election. Akıncı lost re-election to Tatar, taking 48% of the vote in the run-off.

== Early life ==
Akıncı was born in Limassol on 28 December 1947. He studied architecture at the Middle East Technical University, where he met his wife, Meral Akıncı. He returned to Cyprus in 1973 and the couple married in 1974. Their first child, Doğa, was born in 1975.

== Political career ==
=== Early political career and mayorship ===
In 1975, Akıncı was elected to the Constituent Assembly of Turkish Cypriots. He ran as the candidate of the Communal Liberation Party for the mayorship of the Nicosia Turkish Municipality and was endorsed by the Republican Turkish Party in the Northern Cyprus local elections of 24 May 1976. Akıncı campaigned on a platform of democratisation, using the slogan "An order of fraternity instead of an order of whips!" (Turkish: Kırbaç düzeni değil, kardeşlik düzeni). He defeated his main rival, businessman Nevzat Uzunoğlu of the right-wing National Unity Party (UBP), who had been endorsed by historical Turkish Cypriot leader Rauf Denktaş, by a margin of 1500 votes, receiving 48.99% of the votes against Uzunoğlu's 31.81%. Following this election, he became the first elected mayor of the Nicosia Turkish Municipality, and served for an uninterrupted term of 14 years from 1976 to 1990. In the Northern Cyprus local elections of 1 June 1980, he was re-elected with 39.98% of the votes. In the election for his third term, the Northern Cyprus local elections, 1986 of 2 June 1986, the UBP mounted a vigorous campaign to take back the municipality. Akıncı again prevailed with 46.42% of the votes, against 40.93% of the votes for Ramiz Manyera, the UBP candidate.

During his 14 years of Mayorship, he collaborated with Nicosia's then Greek-Cypriot Mayor Lellos Demetriades on the implementation of the Nicosia Sewerage Project and the Nicosia Master Plan. The Nicosia Master Plan received the 'World Habitat Award' in 1989 and the Aga Khan Award for Architecture in 2007. Additionally, in 2003, Akıncı and Demetriades were awarded the 'Europa Nostra Medal of Honour' in recognition of their consistent and successful efforts for Nicosia and its citizens during particularly difficult times, and for the preservation of the historical and architectural environment of the Walled City.

In 1983, Akıncı became the first president of the newly established in Turkish-Cypriot Municipalities. In 1987, he was elected leader of the Communal Liberation Party, a position he would hold until 2001.

In 1985, the Communal Liberation Party (TKP) decided to join the cabinet that was ever headed by UBP leader Derviş Eroğlu. Akıncı, who was Secretary General of TKP at the time, refused the formation of this government. He opposed the economic policy proposed by the Turkish government under Turgut Özal, to which UBP and some ministers of the TKP had supported, and led the party to eventually opposing the agreement on the economy, a move that ended the government. Akıncı referred Erbilen, Minister of Health at the time, to the party's disciplinary committee, which led in Erbilen's resignation from TKP.

=== Member of Parliament; Minister of State; failed presidential bids ===
Between 1993 and 2009, Akıncı served as a member of the parliament of Northern Cyprus. In the presidential election of 15 April 1995, Akıncı ran for the presidency as the TKP candidate. He received 14.23% of the votes and came 4th, behind independent Rauf Denktaş, UBP candidate Derviş Eroğlu and CTP candidate Özker Özgür. On 30 December 1998, he was appointed Minister of State and Deputy Prime Minister in the sixth cabinet headed by Derviş Eroğlu, Akıncı being the head of TKP, the junior partner in the UBP-TKP coalition.

Akıncı ran for the presidency again in the presidential election of 15 April 2000 as the TKP candidate. He received 11.70% of the votes and came 3rd, behind independent Denktaş and UBP candidate Eroğlu, failing to progress to the run-off. He held his ministerial position until 8 June 2001, when the government fell apart.

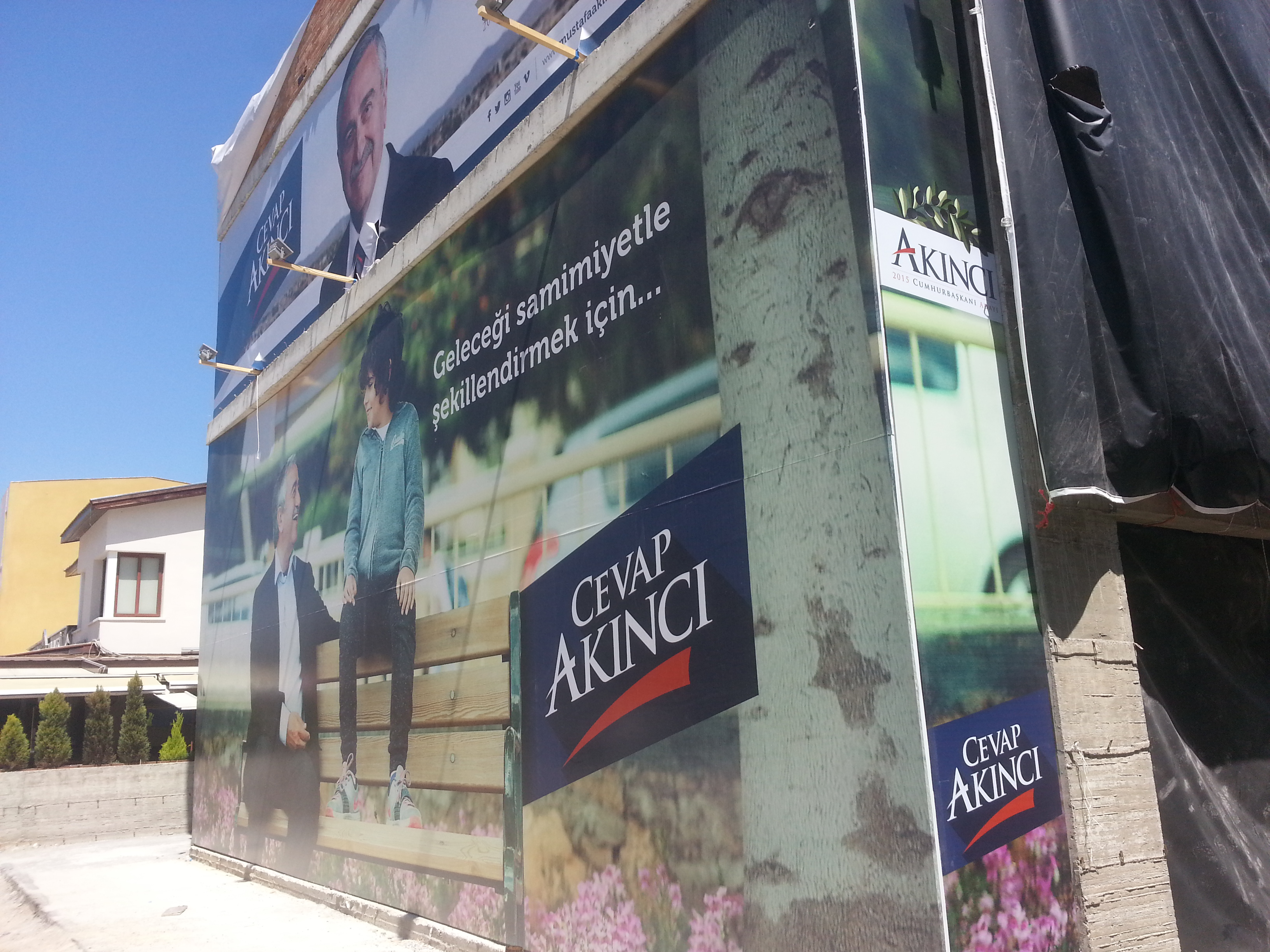
Poster promoting Mustafa Akıncı in Dereboyu Avenue, Northern Nicosia

The TKP, led by Akıncı, was often involved in political friction with President Denktaş and the Turkish military over the Cyprus dispute and various political issues. The TKP called for the continuation of talks between Greek and Turkish Cypriots and the placement of the police under the jurisdiction of the Ministry of the Interior rather than the existing, Turkish military command. Akıncı stated in 2001 that the Northern Cyprus government had run "smoothly" except for two incidents and that the government fell due to the cooperation of Denktaş and Turkey. Later, in 2007, he claimed that the government had fallen in 2001 after an intervention by the Turkish military as a result of a difference in their respective positions in 2000. He claimed that if not for this crisis, he might have had a "chance at the presidency."

=== "Peace and Democracy Movement" ===
In 2003, Akıncı established the social democratic Peace and Democracy Movement party. The main aims of the party were the promotion of the reunification of Cyprus based on the United Nations's Annan Plan and the consequent European Union accession of a re-unified island. As of 2015, Akıncı continued to view European integration very favourably.

=== 2015 presidential bid ===
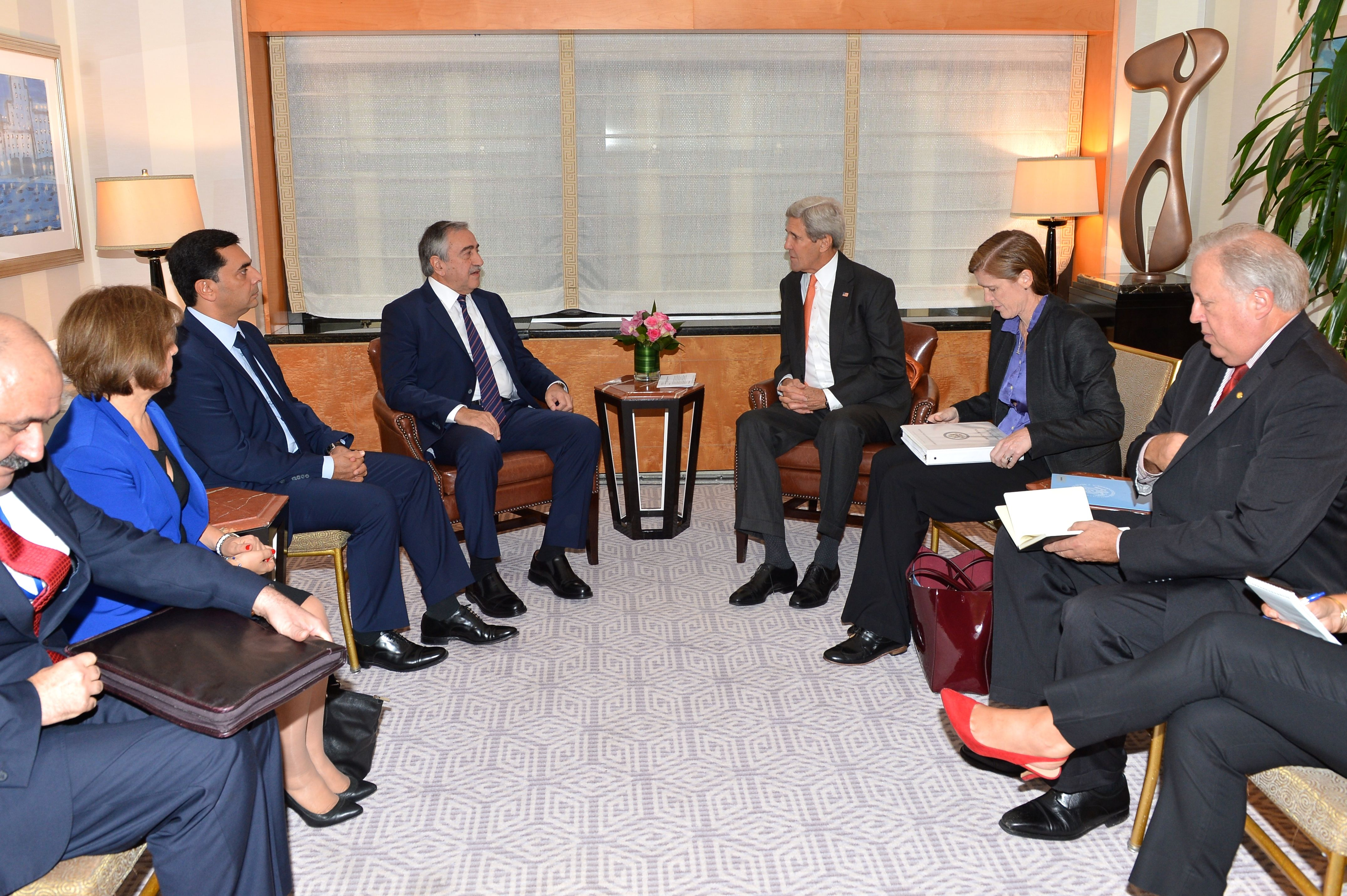
Akıncı with U.S. Secretary of State John Kerry, 2 October 2015

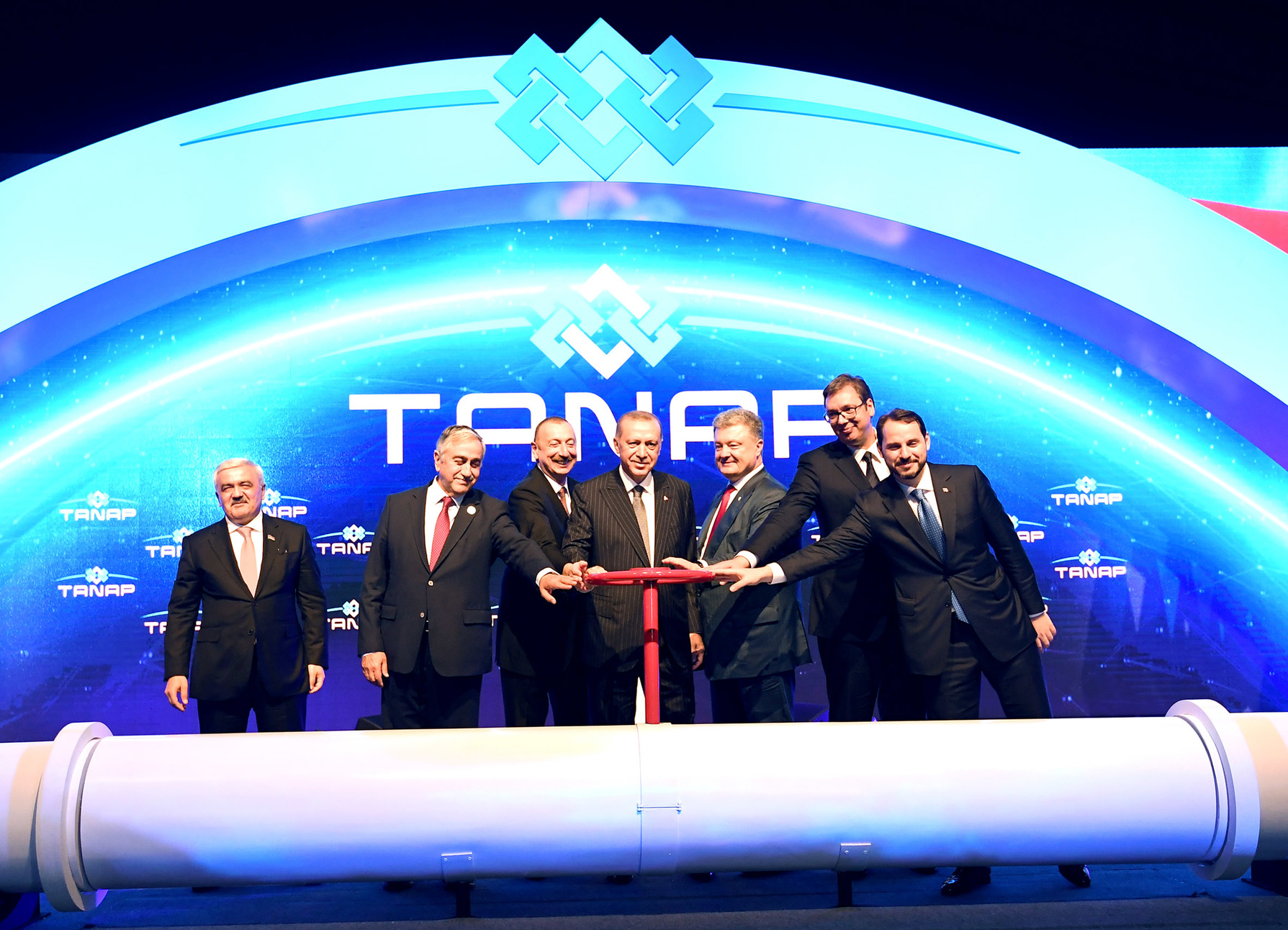
Trans-Anatolian gas pipeline inauguration at the Turkish city of Eskişehir, 12 June 2018

On 13 March 2015, Mustafa Akıncı successfully completed his application to run for presidency.

During his campaign, he spoke out regarding the town of Varosha, calling for "negotiations" to solve the problem. Regarding Varosha, Akıncı stated that, "Instead of living side by side [with] a corpse, let Varosha become a lively city where people live, contractors from both communities do business together, and young people can find jobs".

On 19 April 2015, the presidential elections took place in Northern Cyprus and Mustafa Akıncı won 26.9% of the votes, which put him 2nd behind Derviş Eroğlu who got 28.2% of the votes. As a result, Akıncı advanced to the second round of the presidential elections, facing Derviş Eroğlu in the 26 April 2015 run-off. Akıncı won the second round of the elections with 60.5% of the vote. He was sworn in as president of Northern Cyprus on 30 April 2015.

Akıncı was perceived as representing the "brother nation" (kardeş vatan) outlook regarding relations with Turkey, as opposed to the "young nation" (yavru vatan) outlook officially maintained by Turkey. Akıncı's policy of increasing Northern Cyprus's independence from Turkey met with strong opposition from the Turkish government, with Turkish President Recep Tayyip Erdoğan having a phone-in debate with Akıncı on live TV soon after his election. While Akıncı proposed greater independence from Turkey, the Turkish government was "sceptical" due to the large amount of financial and military aid that had been given to Northern Cyprus since the 1974 invasion.

Political observers, including Greek Cypriot ones, commented that on the "level of statements and impressions, [Akıncı's] election could lighten the atmosphere in future negotiations on the Cyprus problem," adding that "despite Akinci's good intentions, it will be difficult to do any of the things he has in mind without the consent of the Turkish government." Republic of Cyprus President Nicos Anastasiades welcomed the electoral result, posting on Twitter that Akıncı's win was "a hopeful development for our common homeland." Anastasiades added that he'd spoken with Akıncı on the telephone and both men expressed "the desire for genuine reunification of our country."

=== 2020 re-election campaign ===
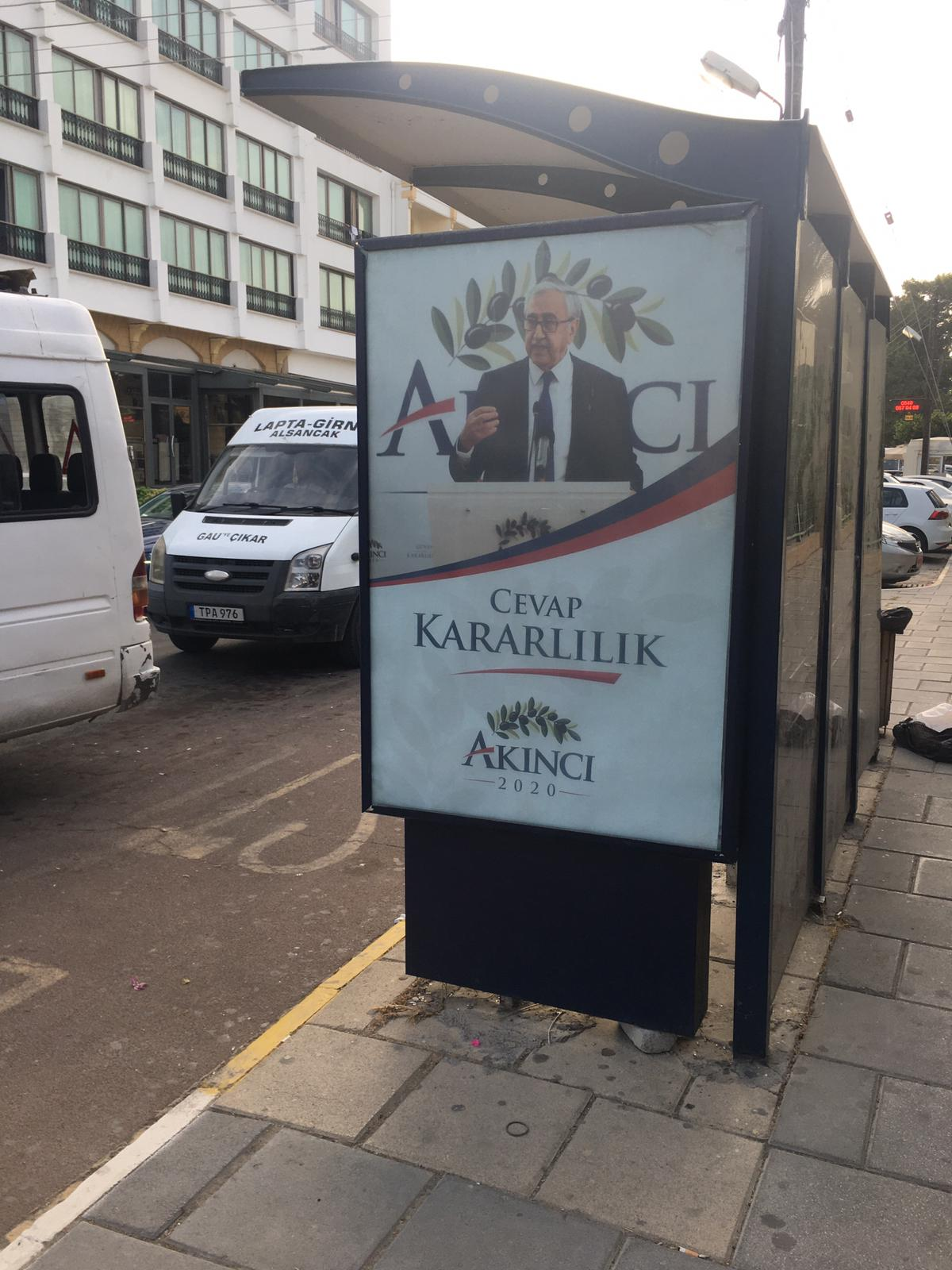
An Akıncı campaign poster in Kyrenia. The slogan reads "The answer is determination".

Akıncı, sought re-election as an independent. He announced his candidacy and set out his vision for a second term on 5 February 2020 at a rally in Nicosia titled "Trust and Determination Evening". He defended the federal model for the resolution of the Cyprus dispute as the only feasible and reasonable option, declaring "We do not want to be a minority amongst Greek Cypriots, nor do we want to be a sub-administration dependent on Turkey." His re-election bid was shaped around the slogan "The Answer is Akıncı" (Turkish: Cevap Akıncı), and the themes promoted in the campaign included "trust", "determination", "sincerity" and "responsibility", all associated with Akıncı.

The TDP chairman Cemal Özyiğit declared his party's support for Akıncı's re-election on 23 October 2019, when Akıncı was yet to announce his candidacy. Other parties to declare support for Akıncı in the first round were the extraparliamentary Communal Liberation Party New Forces, Independence Path, United Cyprus Party and Left Movement. The Republican Turkish Party declared its support for Akıncı in the second round, while the New Cyprus Party called on voters not to vote for Ersin Tatar.

Akıncı made multiple statements over the course of the campaign that the government of Turkey was actively interfering in the elections against him. He stated on 1 October that members of the Turkish parliament of the ruling Justice and Development Party and Nationalist Movement Party were touring villages in Northern Cyprus, telling people not to vote for Akıncı, and that he had been receiving insults and threats from Turkish "sources". The Turkish embassy in Nicosia released a statement condemning "the mentality that considered every Turkish team on the island an interference in the elections" and said that it was unacceptable that "Turkey was being turned into campaign material".

On 9 October, Akıncı stated that he had been threatened by Turkish authorities early in his campaign, with a "person related to intelligence activity in Cyprus" telling his chief of staff that it would be "better for Akıncı himself, his family and the nation" if he withdrew from the election. He also revealed that his, his Chief of Staff's and his campaign team's emails had been hacked into. The Turkish embassy in Nicosia categorically denied that Akıncı had been threatened.

== Book ==
In 2010, Akıncı published Belediye Başkanlığı'nda 14 yıl ("Fourteen Years in the Mayoral Office"), that summarises his experiences as mayor of the Nicosia Turkish Municipality.

== Negotiations ==
A few weeks after being elected president, Mustafa Akıncı, on 11 May 2015, began negotiations directly with Republic of Cyprus president Anastasiades, on the issue of reunification. The negotiations, in which the United Kingdom, Greece, and Turkey were eventually to participate, The talks collapsed without an agreement being reached with both sides accusing each other of failure.

Political offices
| Preceded by Derviş Eroğlu | President of Northern Cyprus; 2015–2020 | Succeeded by Ersin Tatar |
