= Republican Turkish Party =

Republican Turkish Party Cumhuriyetçi Türk Partisi
- Leader: Sıla Usar İncirli
- Founder: Ahmet Mithat Berberoğlu
- Founded: 1970
- Headquarters: North Nicosia, Northern Cyprus
- Youth wing: Cumhuriyetçi Türk Partisi Gençlik Örgütü
- Ideology: Social democracy United Cyprus; Cypriotism
- Political position: Centre-left
- European affiliation: Party of European Socialists (observer)
- International affiliation: Progressive Alliance; Socialist International
- Colours: Red; Green (customary)
- Parliament: 18 / 50
- Municipalities: 7 / 18

Website
- cumhuriyetciturkpartisi.org

The Republican Turkish Party (Turkish: Cumhuriyetçi Türk Partisi, CTP) is a social democratic political party in Northern Cyprus. The party was founded in 1970 by Ahmet Mithat Berberoğlu, a lawyer, in opposition to the leadership of Fazıl Küçük and Rauf Denktaş.

On 30 June 2008, the Republican Turkish Party became a consultative member of the Socialist International (voted in by all members except the Greek Cypriot Movement for Social Democracy). It became a full member of the organization in 2014.

== Policies and ideology ==
The CTP is a social democratic political party, positioned on the centre-left on the political spectrum. The party espoused a pro-Soviet stance during the Cold War, especially under the leadership of Özker Özgür. However, the party never described itself as explicitly communist. Under Özgür, the party held rapprochement meetings with the Greek-Cypriot dominated leftist party of Cyprus, the Progressive Party of Working People (AKEL). Under Mehmet Ali Talat, the party shifted towards its current moderate leftist position.

On the Cyprus dispute, the CTP traditionally favours a pragmatic approach, and supports the reunification of the island. During the presidency of former CTP leader Mehmet Ali Talat, the party led reunification talks with the Republic of Cyprus.

== History ==
=== 20th century ===
The Republican Turkish Party was established in 1970 by Ahmet Mithat Berberoğlu, in opposition to Rauf Denktaş, and later his National Unity Party (UBP). The CTP was further vocally opposed to Fazıl Küçük, who served as the first Vice President of the Republic of Cyprus. The CTP was led by Özker Özgür between 1976 and 1996; Özgür also served as Deputy prime minister in the aftermath of the 1993 legislative election.

=== 21st century ===
Mehmet Ali Talat became party leader in 1996, taking over from Özgür. Under his leadership, the party lost seven seats in the 1998 elections, becoming the fourth largest party in Northern Cyprus. However, in 2003, he led the party to victory, scoring over 35% of the vote, and taking 19 of the 50 seats in the Assembly of the Republic. The following year, Talat formed a government and became prime minister on 13 January 2004. He stepped down in 2005, after winning that year's presidential election; he went on to serve a single term as President of Northern Cyprus, until 2010. During his presidency, Talat conducted weekly meetings with the Greek Cypriot president, Demetris Christofias. The two leaders discussed issues such as power-sharing, armed forces, land ownership, and other problems that would arise in the event of reunification of the island.

Ferdi Sabit Soyer served as leader of the CTP for a certain period, and became prime minister in April 2005 after Talat's presidential victory, serving until May 2009. The CTP lost the 2009 legislative election to the National Unity Party, and entered into opposition in the Assembly of the Republic.

After winning the 2013 elections with 38% of the vote and 21 seats, the CTP chairman Özkan Yorgancıoğlu, in office since 2011, became prime minister of Northern Cyprus on 2 September 2013. His government also included the rightist Democratic Party (DP). In the 2015 presidential elections, CTP fielded Sibel Siber as their candidate. However, Siber took just under 23% of the vote, and was eliminated in the first round of voting. As a result, Özkan Yorgancıoğlu resigned as prime minister two months later; Ömer Kalyoncu, also of the CTP, then formed a grand coalition with the National Unity Party. On 16 April 2016, the CTP government was ousted by a coalition led by Hüseyin Özgürgün, consisting of the National Unity Party and the Democrats, who together ruled Northern Cyprus as a minority government until 2018.

The Republican Turkish Party was returned to power following the 2018 elections. Despite dropping from 38% of the popular vote and first place in 2013 to only 21% and second place, the party was able to put together a four-party coalition, which also included the People's Party, the Communal Democracy Party and the Democratic Party, and held 27 of the 50 seats in parliament. The leader of CTP, Tufan Erhürman, was appointed Prime Minister of Northern Cyprus by President Mustafa Akıncı on 2 February 2018.

== Leaders of the Republican Turkish Party ==
№	Portrait	Name	Term in Office	
№	Portrait	Name	Start	End
1		Ahmet Mithat Berberoğlu	27 December 1970	31 October 1976
2		Özker Özgür	31 October 1976	14 January 1996
3		Mehmet Ali Talat	14 January 1996	24 April 2005
4		Ferdi Sabit Soyer	21 May 2005	5 June 2011
5		Özkan Yorgancıoğlu	5 June 2011	14 June 2015
(3)		Mehmet Ali Talat	14 June 2015	13 November 2016
6		Tufan Erhürman	13 November 2016	24 October 2025
7		Sıla Usar İncirli	30 November 2025	Incumbent

== Election results ==
=== Parliamentary ===
Assembly of the Republic
Election	Votes			Seats		Role	Notes
Election	#	%	Rank	#	±	Role	Notes
1976	97,637	12.9	3rd	2 / 40	new	in opposition	
1981	152,805	15.1	3rd	5 / 40	▲3	in opposition	
1985	317,843	21.4	2nd	12 / 50	▲7	in opposition	
1990	776,418	44.5	2nd	16 / 50	▲4	in opposition	With Party for Democratic Struggle.
1993	433,134	24.2	3rd	13 / 50	▼3	CTP–DP coalition	
1998	145,874	13.4	4th	6 / 50	▼7	in opposition	
2003	469,279	35.2	1st	19 / 50	▲13	CTP–DP coalition	
2005	577,444	44.5	1st	24 / 50	▲5	CTP–DP coalition	
2009	415.574	29.2	2nd	15 / 50	▼9	in opposition	
2013	477,209	38.4	1st	21 / 50	▲6	CTP–DP coalition	Opposition from 2016.
2018	1,121,478	20.9	2nd	12 / 50	▼9	CTP–HP–TDP–DP coalition	Opposition from 2019.
2022	1,597,137	32.0	2nd	18 / 50	▲6	in opposition	

== See also ==
- Sonay Adem
- Naci Talat
- Asım Akansoy
