= People's Party (Northern Cyprus) =

People's Party Halkın Partisi
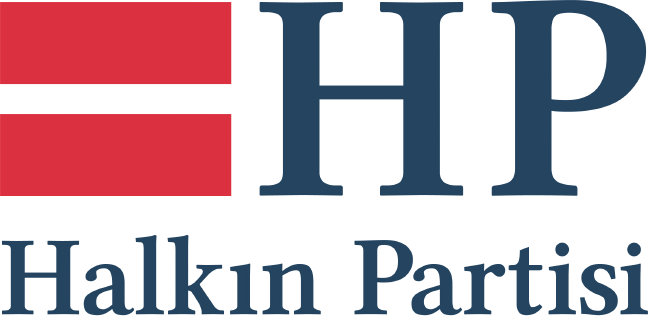
- Chairman: Kudret Özersay
- General Secretary: Ahmet Tokatlıoğlu
- Founded: 6 January 2016
- Headquarters: North Nicosia, Northern Cyprus
- Ideology: Anti-corruption; Third Way; Populism
- Political position: Centre
- Colours: Blue, Red, White
- Parliament: 0 / 50

Website
- www.halkinpartisi.biz

The People's Party (Turkish: Halkın Partisi, HP) is a political party in Northern Cyprus, founded on 6 January 2016. The party has stated its aims as erasing the old political system based on corruption, and the good administration of Northern Cyprus. Its leader is Kudret Özersay and its secretary general is Ahmet Tokatlıoğlu. It first gained representation in the parliament in the 2018 elections.

The party has a different organization from all other political parties in Northern Cyprus. It has no women's or youth wings, with the stated aim of directly integrating women and youth into its administration. It has no system of delegates that represent local branches of the party and there are no heads of local branches. It prohibits members of the parliament who have switched or are switching parties, or those who have served as leader or secretary general in another party from joining it. The party claims that the problems of Northern Cyprus do not stem from ideology, but stem from the degeneration in its application. It operates upon two stated principles: good governance, including the eradication of partisanship and corruption and maximizing transparency, and social justice, where the state will support the vulnerable.

== Formation ==
Following the decision to form a party, the People's Party was established by 51 founding members under the leadership of Kudret Özersay. On January 6, 2015, Kudret Özersay, together with the founding members, filed an application for forming a party to the Ministry of Interior of the TRNC. The Turkish Cypriot Chamber of Commerce issued a press release to the Turkish Cypriot Chamber of Commerce. Kudret Özersay and Tolga Atakan were elected as the Secretary General at the first party meeting held on January 8.

== Election results ==
Assembly of the Republic
Election	Votes			Seats		Role
Election	#	%	Rank	#	±	Role
2018	915,666	17.1	3rd	9 / 50	new	CTP–HP–TDP–DP coalition (2018–2019); UBP-HP coalition (2019–2020); Opposition (2020–)
2022	333,090	6.7	4th	3 / 50	▼6	in opposition
