= Rebirth Party (Northern Cyprus) =

Rebirth Party Yeniden Doğuş Partisi
- Chairman: Erhan Arıklı
- General Secretary: Talip Atalay
- Founded: 7 October 2016
- Split from: Democratic Party
- Headquarters: North Nicosia, Northern Cyprus
- Ideology: Turkish nationalism Conservatism; Two-state solution
- Political position: Center-right
- Colours: Turquoise, Red
- Parliament: 2 / 50

Website
- www.ydpkktc.com/Default.aspx

The Rebirth Party (Turkish: Yeniden Doğuş Partisi, YDP) is a political party in Northern Cyprus. It was founded on 7 October 2016. Its leader is Erhan Arıklı, a professor, and its Secretary General is Turan Büyükyılmaz. Arıklı has stated that the ideological basis of the party is "allegiance to the motherland, Turkey" and "to ensure the survival of the Turkish Republic of Northern Cyprus". However, the party strongly rejects the classification of Northern Cyprus as the "daughter country" of Turkey and states that it advocates an equal relationship between Turkey and Northern Cyprus as independent states.

The party represents the continuation of the New Dawn Party (Turkish: Yeni Doğuş Partisi), a historical political party that represented the interest of the Turkish settlers in Northern Cyprus. It was founded with the reorganization of the Rebirth Movement, founded in 2015 as a "movement across party lines". The majority of its founders consisted of those who had their political origin in the Democratic Party.

Journalist Levent Özadam has written that Arıklı and other founders of the party had a nationalistic ideology and that the party would be one of the settlers; such concerns were shared by scholar Mehmet Hasgüler. Özadam further pointed out that the head of the association of Cypriot residents with Hatay origins had resigned from the National Unity Party and was expected to join the Rebirth Party. The party itself, however, has strongly rejected charges of exclusivity to settlers.

== Election results ==
Assembly of the Republic
Election	Votes			Seats		Role
Election	#	%	Rank	#	±	Role
2018	375,113	7.0	6th	2 / 50	new	in opposition
2022	318,763	6.4	5th	2 / 50	0	UBP–DP–YDP coalition
