= Ersin Tatar =

President of Northern Cyprus from 2020 to 2025

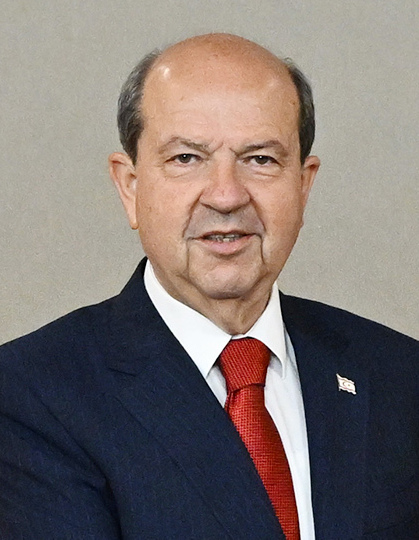
- Tatar in 2025

5th President of Northern Cyprus
- In office 23 October 2020 – 24 October 2025
- Prime Minister: Ersan Saner; Faiz Sucuoğlu; Ünal Üstel
- Preceded by: Mustafa Akıncı
- Succeeded by: Tufan Erhürman

13th Prime Minister of Northern Cyprus
- In office 22 May 2019 – 23 October 2020
- President: Mustafa Akıncı
- Preceded by: Tufan Erhürman
- Succeeded by: Ersan Saner

Leader of the National Unity Party
- In office 30 October 2018 – 23 October 2020
- Preceded by: Hüseyin Özgürgün
- Succeeded by: Ersan Saner

Leader of the Opposition
- In office 30 October 2018 – 22 May 2019
- Prime Minister: Tufan Erhürman

Member of the Assembly of the Republic
- In office 19 April 2009 – 23 October 2020
- Constituency: Lefkoşa (2009, 2013, 2018)

Personal details
- Born: 7 September 1960 (age 65) Nicosia, Cyprus
- Party: National Unity Party (2003–2020)
- Spouse: Sibel Tatar
- Children: 2
- Education: Forest School, Walthamstow
- Alma mater: Jesus College, Cambridge

Ersin Tatar (born 7 September 1960) is a Turkish Cypriot politician who served as the fifth president of Northern Cyprus (de facto state) from 2020 to 2025. He previously served as the fourth Prime Minister of Northern Cyprus following the collapse of Tufan Erhürman's coalition government in 2019, and remained so until his election as president. He was also the leader of the National Unity Party (UBP) and Leader of the Opposition from 2018 until his election.

== Early life ==
Tatar comes from a family of Crimean Tatars who left Crimea in the 19th century and eventually moved to Cyprus. Tatar was born in Nicosia on 7 September 1960, the son of Canev and Rüstem Tatar. His father was also a politician. He was sent to England to attend Forest School, a private boarding school in Walthamstow, then earned an economics degree from Cambridge University's Jesus College in 1982.

== Pre-politics career ==
From 1982 to 1986, Tatar worked as a chartered accountant for PriceWaterhouse in London. From 1986 to 1991, he worked for Polly Peck, and was the company's assistant treasurer when it collapsed with debts of £1.3 billion. In the resulting trial that led to CEO Asil Nadir receiving a 10-year jail term, it was alleged that Tatar had "assisted Mr. Nadir in the dishonest movement of money from PPI and enjoyed a close working relationship with the Polly Peck boss". When Tatar visited the UK in 2019, for the first time since 1991, there was concern that he might be arrested for his role in the scandal; however, the government's Serious Fraud Office said that this was "no longer in the public interest".

In 1991, Tatar moved to Ankara, where he worked at FMC Nurol Defense Industry Co. until 1992. From 1992 to 2001, he was the general coordinator of Show TV, a Turkish television channel owned by Ciner Media Group. In 1996, he founded the television channel Kanal T in Nicosia. He was also an active member of the Cypriot diaspora community in Turkey, and was chair of the Istanbul Turkish Cypriot Cultural Association from 1997 to 2001.

== Politics ==
Tatar entered politics in 2003, joining the National Unity Party (UBP). He was first elected to Parliament in 2009, serving as Finance Minister under Derviş Eroğlu until his party's electoral defeat in 2013. He unsuccessfully ran for the UBP leadership in 2015, before running again and winning in 2018. He voiced support for the 2019 Turkish offensive into north-eastern Syria and said that Turkish Cypriots "are always on Turkey's side". He is a supporter of a two-state solution to the Cyprus dispute.

One week before the 2020 Northern Cyprus presidential election, Tatar visited Turkey. After his arrival, he announced that he would be reopening the Varosha beachfront with Turkish President Recep Tayyip Erdoğan's blessing. The move to open Varosha, which had been closed to the public and guarded by Turkish soldiers since the 1974 Turkish invasion of Cyprus, attracted widespread condemnation both in Northern Cyprus and the Republic of Cyprus, as well as the international community. His Deputy Prime Minister Kudret Özersay resigned, accusing of Tatar of stealing his idea; Özersay, who was the first to call for the reopening of Varosha under Turkish Cypriot control, said he was against Tatar's decision because he had turned the issue into a campaign matter ahead of the election. Özersay was also a candidate in the election. Özersay's resignation triggered a crisis that led to the government of Northern Cyprus dissolving just one week before the election. Attempting to deflect the accusations that the decision to reopen Varosha was not a campaign ploy on behalf of Turkey, Tatar said he made the decision in his capacity as Prime Minister and not as a candidate in the upcoming elections.

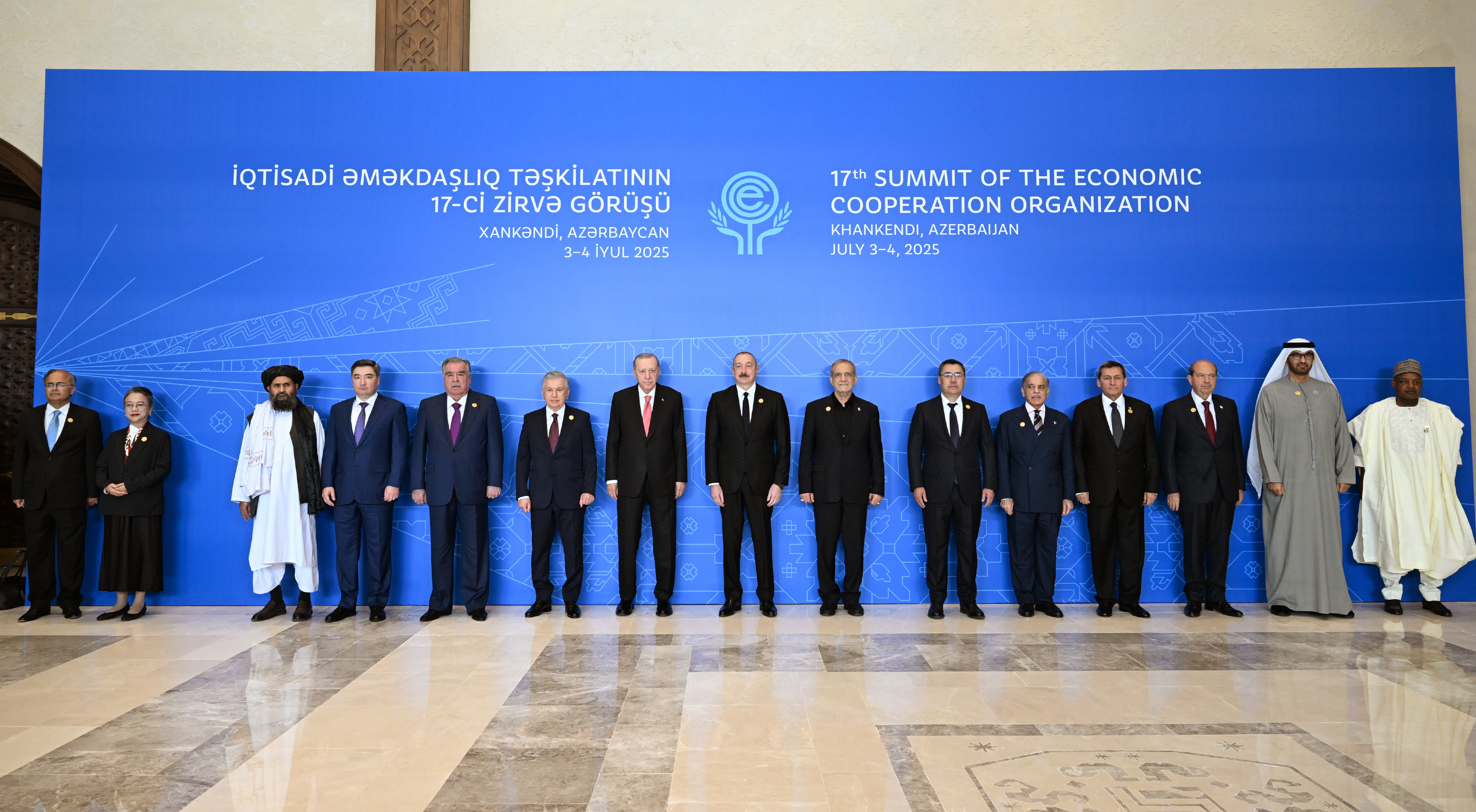
Group photo at the 17th ECO Summit in Khankendi, Azerbaijan, featuring Ersin Tatar, 4 July 2025

In the second and final round of the election on 18 October 2020, Tatar received 51.69% of the vote whilst incumbent President Mustafa Akıncı received 48.31%, the closest ever margin in the history of Northern Cyprus. Tatar took office on 23 October. The election was marred by accusations that Turkey had interfered on Tatar's behalf.

Tatar was decisively defeated in the 2025 Northern Cypriot presidential election on 19 October 2025, receiving 35.81% of the vote while former Prime Minister Tufan Erhürman received 62.76%.

== Personal life ==
Tatar is married to Sibel Tatar, with whom he has two children.

Political offices
Preceded by Tufan Erhürman	Prime Minister of Northern Cyprus; 2019–2020	Succeeded by Ersan Saner
Preceded by Mustafa Akıncı	President of Northern Cyprus; 2020–2025	Succeeded by Tufan Erhürman
