= Democratic Party (Northern Cyprus) =

Democratic Party Demokrat Parti
- Leader: Fikri Ataoğlu
- Founded: 30 July 1992
- Split from: National Unity Party
- Headquarters: North Nicosia, Northern Cyprus
- Ideology: Conservatism; Turkish Cypriot nationalism Two-state solution
- Political position: Centre-right
- Colors: Red, White, Green
- Parliament: 3 / 50
- Municipalities: 1 / 18

Website
- kktcdemokratparti.org

The Democratic Party (Turkish: Demokrat Parti, DP) is a conservative political party in Northern Cyprus. The leader of the party is Fikri Ataoğlu.

== Overview ==
The Democratic Party was founded as a breakaway from the ruling right-wing National Unity Party (UBP) in 1992. The party merged in 1993 with the New Dawn Party (YDP), a party representing the interests of the Turkish settlers in Northern Cyprus, and consistently had high levels of support in the settler population until the 2003 election. Rauf Denktaş had considerable influence on the party.

At the legislative elections for the Assembly of the Republic on 20 January 2005, the party won 13.5% of the popular vote and 6 out of 50 seats. Its candidate, Mustafa Arabacıoğlu, won 13.3% of the votes in the Northern Cyprus presidential elections on 17 April 2005. At the legislative elections on 19 April 2009 the DP won 5 out of 50 seats and 10.7% of the popular vote.

In 2013, 8 members of the parliament resigned from the National Unity Party (UBP) and joined the Democratic Party. The party subsequently renamed itself Democratic Party — National Forces. At the legislative elections in 2013, the DP greatly increased its share of the votes and won 12 out of 50 seats and 23.2% of the popular vote. The party then subsequently went on to become the junior partner of the coalition government under the Republican Turkish Party (CTP). However, in 2014, four members of the parliament resigned from the party and three of them joined the National Unity Party. In July 2015, the party became the main opposition party, against the CTP-UBP coalition. It joined the government as the junior partner once again, this time with the UBP, in April 2016.

== Leaders of the Democratic Party ==
- Hakkı Atun (30 July 1992 – 16 August 1996)
- Serdar Denktaş (16 August 1996 – 2000)
- Salih Coşar (2000 – December 2002)
- Serdar Denktaş (December 2002 – 30 November 2019)
- Fikri Ataoğlu (30 November 2019 – present)

== Election results ==
Assembly of the Republic
Election	Votes			Seats		Role
Election	#	%	Rank	#	±	Role
1993	—N/a	29.2	2nd	16 / 50	new	DP–CTP coalition
1998	246,602	22.6	4th	13 / 50	▼3	UBP–DP coalition
2003	172,473	12.9	3rd	7 / 50	▼6	CTP–DP coalition
2005	174,721	13.5	3rd	6 / 50	▼1	CTP–DP coalition
2009	150,695	10.7	3rd	5 / 50	▼1	in opposition
2013	288,021	23.2	3rd	12 / 50	▲7	CTP–DP coalition
2018	420,102	7.8	5th	3 / 50	▼9	CTP–HP–TDP–DP coalition
2022	369,239	7.4	3rd	3 / 50	0	UBP–DP-YDP coalition
