= Kudret Özersay =

Turkish Cypriot politician

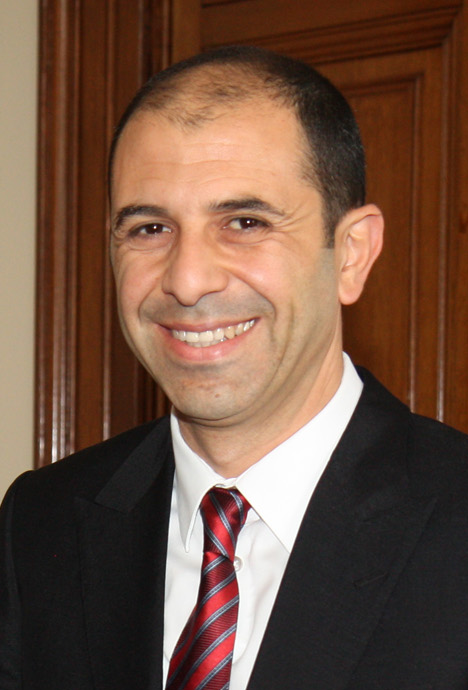

Deputy Prime Minister of Northern Cyprus Minister of Foreign Affairs
- In office 2 February 2018 – 9 December 2020
- Preceded by: Serdar Denktaş (Deputy Prime Minister); Tahsin Ertuğruloğlu (Minister of Foreign Affairs)
- Succeeded by: Erhan Arıklı (Deputy Prime Minister); Tahsin Ertuğruloğlu (Minister of Foreign Affairs)

Leader of the People's Party
- In office 6 January 2016 – 11 January 2020
- Preceded by: office established
- Succeeded by: Yenal Senin

Member of the Assembly of Republic
- Incumbent
- Assumed office 7 January 2018
- Constituency: Lefkoşa (2018)

Personal details
- Born: 16 December 1973 (age 52) Alaminos, Cyprus
- Party: People's Party
- Spouse: Aliye Ummanel
- Education: Ankara University (PhD)
- Website: www.kudretozersay.com

Kudret Özersay (born 16 December 1973) is a Turkish Cypriot academic, diplomat and politician. A scholar in international politics by profession, he served in the negotiations to solve the Cyprus dispute between 2002 and 2012 and in 2014. He was the Special Representative of the President of Northern Cyprus between 2010 and 2012 and again in 2014. He established and led the Toparlanıyoruz Movement and is one of the founders and the current leader of People's Party.

His father was one of the victims of the 1974 Alaminos massacre in Cyprus.

== Education ==
Özersay studied international relations at Ankara University. His 2002 PhD thesis was on the "Validity of the 1959–1960 Cyprus Treaties In International Law".

== Political career ==
Özersay became involved in the negotiations to solve the Cyprus dispute under President Rauf Denktaş in 2002. He then was a part of President Mehmet Ali Talat's team for the negotiations. He was appointed as the Special Representative of Turkish Cypriot President Derviş Eroğlu on 9 May 2010. In May 2012, he founded the Toparlanıyoruz Movement, with the stated aim of combating corruption in politics, increasing transparency in political parties and bureaucracy and bringing about positive change to the political order. This move was disapproved by Eroğlu and he resigned from his post on 8 June 2012. The movement headed by him criticized the government, political parties, and other institutions such as the Directorate General for Police.

On 8 February 2014, Özersay was appointed by Eroğlu as the Chief Negotiator. However, after his announcement of his candidacy for the 2015 presidential election, Eroğlu removed him from his post on 8 October 2014.

Özersay ran for President of Northern Cyprus in the 2015 election and finished fourth, thus being eliminated in the first round. However, he received 21.3% of the vote in an election where all four leading candidates received votes between 20% and 30%. His share of the vote was seen as a surprise success, especially given his lack of political history and lack of endorsement from any political party.

On 6 January 2016, Özersay, along with other founding members, established the People's Party, after leaving the leadership of the Toparlanıyoruz Movement. He stated the party's aim as erasing the old political order based on corruption and the good administration of the Turkish Cypriot people.
