= Prime Minister of Northern Cyprus =

Head of government

Prime Minister of Northern Cyprus Kuzey Kıbrıs Türk Cumhuriyeti Başbakanı
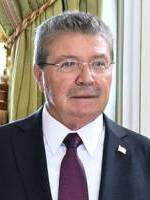
- Incumbent; Ünal Üstel since 12 May 2022
- Appointer: President of Northern Cyprus
- Inaugural holder: Mustafa Çağatay
- Formation: 15 November 1983; 42 years ago
- Website: basbakanlik.gov.ct.tr

The Turkish Republic of Northern Cyprus takes place in a framework of a semi-presidential representative democratic republic.

The president is head of state and the prime minister head of government, and of a multi-party system. Executive power is exercised by the government. Legislative power is vested in both the government and the Assembly of the Republic. The judiciary is independent of the executive and the legislature. The prime minister must command a majority of parliament in order to govern.

There have been 10 prime ministers of Northern Cyprus since 1983. The premiership's precursor was a post known as the "president of the Turkish Cypriot Communal Chamber". The only man to occupy this post was Rauf Denktaş from 29 December 1969 to 5 July 1976. There were three prime ministers before the Turkish Cypriot community's unilateral declaration of independence in 1983.

The incumbent prime minister, Ünal Üstel, took the oath of office on 12 May 2022.

== See also ==
- Assembly of the Republic (Northern Cyprus)
- List of prime ministers of Northern Cyprus
- Deputy Prime Minister of Northern Cyprus
