= List of political parties in Northern Cyprus =

This article lists political parties in Northern Cyprus. The Turkish Republic of Northern Cyprus has a multi-party system. No political parties registered in the Republic of Cyprus are concurrently registered in Northern Cyprus and vice versa.

== Active parties ==
=== Parties represented in the Assembly ===
Name	Abbr.	Ideology	Leader	MPs
National Unity Party; Ulusal Birlik Partisi	UBP	Turkish nationalism, Conservatism	Faiz Sucuoğlu	24 / 50
Republican Turkish Party; Cumhuriyetçi Türk Partisi	CTP	Social democracy, Cypriot nationalism	Tufan Erhürman	19 / 50
Democratic Party; Demokrat Parti	DP	Turkish nationalism, Conservatism	Fikri Ataoğlu	3 / 50
Rebirth Party; Yeniden Doğuş Partisi	YDP	Turkish nationalism	Erhan Arıklı	2 / 50
Independent				2 / 50

=== Parties without representation ===
- People's Party (Halkın Partisi)
- Communal Democracy Party (Toplumcu Demokrasi Partisi)
- Nationalist Democracy Party (Milliyetçi Demokrasi Partisi)
- New Cyprus Party (Yeni Kıbrıs Partisi)
- United Cyprus Party (Birleşik Kıbrıs Partisi)
- Cyprus Socialist Party (Kıbrıs Sosyalist Partisi)
- Independence Path (Bağımsızlık Yolu Partisi)
- Freedom and Peace Party (Özgürlük ve Barış Partisi)

== Defunct parties ==
- Communal Liberation Party (Toplumcu Kurtuluş Partisi)
- Communal Liberation Party New Forces (Toplumcu Kurtuluş Partisi Yeni Güçler)
- National Birth Party (Ulusal Diriliş Partisi)
- Nationalist Peace Party (Milliyetçi Barış Partisi)
- New Dawn Party (Yeni Doğuş Partisi)
- New Party (Yeni Parti)
- Peace and Democracy Movement (Barış ve Demokrasi Hareketi)
- Solution and EU Party (Çözüm ve AB Partisi)

== See also ==
- List of political parties in Cyprus
- List of political parties
