= Middelfart (nomination district) =

Electoral constituency in Denmark

- Middelfart
- Nomination district constituency for the Folketing
- Location of Middelfart within Funen

- Location of Funen within Denmark
- Municipalities: Middelfart; Nordfyn
- Constituency: Funen
- Electorate: 52,356 (2022)

Current constituency
- Created: 1849 (as constituency); 1920 (as nomination district)

Middelfart nominating district is one of the 92 nominating districts that exists for Danish elections following the 2007 municipal reform. It consists of Middelfart and Nordfyn municipality. It was created in 1849 as a constituency, and has been a nomination district since 1920, though its boundaries have been changed since then.

In general elections, the district tends to vote a bit more for parties commonly associated with the blue bloc.

== General elections results ==
=== General elections in the 2020s ===
2022 Danish general election

Parties	Vote		
Parties	Votes	%	+ / -
Social Democrats	14,314	32.57	+1.17
Venstre	5,880	13.38	-14.39
Denmark Democrats	5,087	11.58	New
Moderates	4,335	9.87	New
Green Left	2,972	6.76	+0.95
Liberal Alliance	2,873	6.54	+4.83
Conservatives	2,113	4.81	-1.28
New Right	2,057	4.68	+2.58
Danish People's Party	1,324	3.01	-7.31
Red–Green Alliance	1,073	2.44	-1.52
Social Liberals	935	2.13	-3.04
The Alternative	710	1.62	-0.14
Christian Democrats	156	0.36	-0.76
Independent Greens	81	0.18	New
Millah Kongsbach	32	0.07	New
Total	43,942		

=== General elections in the 2010s ===
2019 Danish general election

Parties	Vote		
Parties	Votes	%	+ / -
Social Democrats	13,645	31.40	+2.16
Venstre	12,069	27.77	+6.56
Danish People's Party	4,484	10.32	-14.35
Conservatives	2,648	6.09	+2.78
Green Left	2,527	5.81	+2.12
Social Liberals	2,248	5.17	+2.39
Red–Green Alliance	1,722	3.96	-1.66
New Right	911	2.10	New
Stram Kurs	884	2.03	New
The Alternative	763	1.76	-1.18
Liberal Alliance	745	1.71	-4.44
Christian Democrats	487	1.12	+0.72
Klaus Riskær Pedersen Party	329	0.76	New
Total	43,462		

2015 Danish general election

Parties	Vote		
Parties	Votes	%	+ / -
Social Democrats	12,724	29.24	+2.41
Danish People's Party	10,735	24.67	+10.61
Venstre	9,230	21.21	-7.86
Liberal Alliance	2,675	6.15	+1.69
Red–Green Alliance	2,444	5.62	+1.47
Green Left	1,606	3.69	-5.67
Conservatives	1,439	3.31	-1.27
The Alternative	1,280	2.94	New
Social Liberals	1,212	2.78	-4.30
Christian Democrats	175	0.40	+0.02
Total	43,520		

2011 Danish general election

Parties	Vote		
Parties	Votes	%	+ / -
Venstre	12,774	29.07	+3.51
Social Democrats	11,791	26.83	+0.68
Danish People's Party	6,179	14.06	-2.21
Green Left	4,112	9.36	-1.46
Social Liberals	3,112	7.08	+2.70
Conservatives	2,013	4.58	-8.74
Liberal Alliance	1,960	4.46	+2.23
Red–Green Alliance	1,825	4.15	+3.25
Christian Democrats	166	0.38	+0.04
Michael Ellegård	12	0.03	+0.01
Lars Grønbæk Larsen	4	0.01	New
Total	43,948		

=== General elections in the 2000s ===
2007 Danish general election

Parties	Vote		
Parties	Votes	%	+ / -
Social Democrats	11,214	26.15	-2.31
Venstre	10,961	25.56	-1.37
Danish People's Party	6,977	16.27	+2.57
Conservatives	5,712	13.32	-0.31
Green Left	4,641	10.82	+6.16
Social Liberals	1,880	4.38	-3.73
New Alliance	957	2.23	New
Red–Green Alliance	386	0.90	-1.30
Christian Democrats	146	0.34	-0.77
Michael Ellegård	9	0.02	New
Total	42,883		

2005 Danish general election

Parties	Vote		
Parties	Votes	%	+ / -
Social Democrats	9,551	28.46	-2.67
Venstre	9,037	26.93	-2.54
Danish People's Party	4,597	13.70	+1.06
Conservatives	4,574	13.63	+1.83
Social Liberals	2,722	8.11	+2.91
Green Left	1,565	4.66	-0.19
Red–Green Alliance	737	2.20	+0.75
Christian Democrats	371	1.11	-0.50
Centre Democrats	307	0.91	-0.40
Minority Party	93	0.28	New
Total	33,554		

2001 Danish general election

Parties	Vote		
Parties	Votes	%	+ / -
Social Democrats	10,611	31.13	-7.06
Venstre	10,045	29.47	+4.48
Danish People's Party	4,309	12.64	+4.44
Conservatives	4,022	11.80	+3.91
Social Liberals	1,774	5.20	+0.06
Green Left	1,654	4.85	-1.81
Christian People's Party	550	1.61	-0.32
Red–Green Alliance	493	1.45	+0.01
Centre Democrats	446	1.31	-2.66
Progress Party	184	0.54	-0.74
Total	34,088		

=== General elections in the 1990s ===
1998 Danish general election

Parties	Vote		
Parties	Votes	%	+ / -
Social Democrats	12,990	38.19	-0.67
Venstre	8,502	24.99	+1.23
Danish People's Party	2,788	8.20	New
Conservatives	2,685	7.89	-4.64
Green Left	2,264	6.66	+1.04
Social Liberals	1,750	5.14	-0.78
Centre Democrats	1,352	3.97	+1.92
Christian People's Party	655	1.93	+0.63
Red–Green Alliance	490	1.44	-0.24
Progress Party	434	1.28	-6.93
Democratic Renewal	96	0.28	New
Svend Jensen	12	0.04	New
Total	34,018		

1994 Danish general election

Parties	Vote		
Parties	Votes	%	+ / -
Social Democrats	12,730	38.86	-0.83
Venstre	7,782	23.76	+7.08
Conservatives	4,105	12.53	-1.34
Progress Party	2,689	8.21	-1.12
Social Liberals	1,940	5.92	+0.67
Green Left	1,840	5.62	-0.35
Centre Democrats	670	2.05	-1.91
Red–Green Alliance	551	1.68	+0.58
Christian People's Party	427	1.30	-0.27
Else Lundgaard	12	0.04	New
Michael Ellegård	7	0.02	New
Leif Nybo	4	0.01	New
Bjørn Henriksen	2	0.01	New
Total	32,759		

1990 Danish general election

Parties	Vote		
Parties	Votes	%	+ / -
Social Democrats	12,880	39.69	+7.53
Venstre	5,413	16.68	+4.09
Conservatives	4,499	13.87	-3.84
Progress Party	3,029	9.33	-2.83
Green Left	1,937	5.97	-3.63
Social Liberals	1,705	5.25	-2.13
Centre Democrats	1,285	3.96	+0.37
Christian People's Party	511	1.57	+0.26
Common Course	376	1.16	-0.50
Red–Green Alliance	356	1.10	New
The Greens	240	0.74	-0.31
Justice Party of Denmark	204	0.63	New
Humanist Party	9	0.03	New
Mogens Trondhjem	3	0.01	New
Tage Abildgart	1	0.00	New
Total	32,448		

=== General elections in the 1980s ===
1988 Danish general election

Parties	Vote		
Parties	Votes	%	+ / -
Social Democrats	10,627	32.16	-0.03
Conservatives	5,853	17.71	-2.18
Venstre	4,159	12.59	+0.97
Progress Party	4,017	12.16	+5.38
Green Left	3,173	9.60	-1.84
Social Liberals	2,440	7.38	-0.94
Centre Democrats	1,188	3.59	+0.07
Common Course	550	1.66	+0.04
Christian People's Party	432	1.31	-0.45
The Greens	347	1.05	-0.01
Communist Party of Denmark	171	0.52	-0.10
Left Socialists	87	0.26	-0.26
Carl Erik Jørgensen	3	0.01	New
Total	33,047		

1987 Danish general election

Parties	Vote		
Parties	Votes	%	+ / -
Social Democrats	10,765	32.19	-0.68
Conservatives	6,652	19.89	-2.89
Venstre	3,886	11.62	-2.81
Green Left	3,827	11.44	+3.12
Social Liberals	2,784	8.32	+0.10
Progress Party	2,267	6.78	+3.04
Centre Democrats	1,178	3.52	-0.88
Christian People's Party	589	1.76	-0.30
Common Course	541	1.62	New
The Greens	355	1.06	New
Communist Party of Denmark	209	0.62	+0.20
Left Socialists	173	0.52	-0.79
Justice Party of Denmark	151	0.45	-0.93
Humanist Party	43	0.13	New
Socialist Workers Party	12	0.04	-0.02
Marxist–Leninists Party	8	0.02	+0.01
Henrik Nørregård Nielsen	3	0.01	New
Total	33,443		

1984 Danish general election

Parties	Vote		
Parties	Votes	%	+ / -
Social Democrats	10,941	32.87	-1.08
Conservatives	7,583	22.78	+9.86
Venstre	4,804	14.43	+0.36
Green Left	2,768	8.32	+0.16
Social Liberals	2,737	8.22	+0.20
Centre Democrats	1,464	4.40	-4.02
Progress Party	1,245	3.74	-6.10
Christian People's Party	685	2.06	+0.51
Justice Party of Denmark	460	1.38	+0.17
Left Socialists	435	1.31	+0.22
Communist Party of Denmark	140	0.42	-0.19
Socialist Workers Party	19	0.06	+0.03
Marxist–Leninists Party	4	0.01	New
Carl Erik Jørgensen	4	0.01	New
Total	33,289		

1981 Danish general election

Parties	Vote		
Parties	Votes	%	+ / -
Social Democrats	10,478	33.95	-4.36
Venstre	4,343	14.07	-0.77
Conservatives	3,988	12.92	+1.28
Progress Party	3,038	9.84	-2.71
Centre Democrats	2,598	8.42	+5.12
Green Left	2,518	8.16	+4.12
Social Liberals	2,476	8.02	+0.11
Christian People's Party	479	1.55	-0.41
Justice Party of Denmark	372	1.21	-0.86
Left Socialists	337	1.09	-0.82
Communist Party of Denmark	189	0.61	-0.60
Communist Workers Party	22	0.07	-0.18
Anders Bondo Christensen	11	0.04	New
Socialist Workers Party	10	0.03	New
Total	30,859		

=== General elections in the 1970s ===
1979 Danish general election

Parties	Vote		
Parties	Votes	%	+ / -
Social Democrats	12,116	38.31	+2.72
Venstre	4,694	14.84	+0.03
Progress Party	3,970	12.55	-3.01
Conservatives	3,682	11.64	+3.06
Social Liberals	2,501	7.91	+0.84
Green Left	1,277	4.04	+1.44
Centre Democrats	1,043	3.30	-2.34
Justice Party of Denmark	655	2.07	-0.70
Christian People's Party	621	1.96	-0.85
Left Socialists	605	1.91	+0.68
Communist Party of Denmark	382	1.21	-1.13
Communist Workers Party	79	0.25	New
Total	31,625		

1977 Danish general election

Parties	Vote		
Parties	Votes	%	+ / -
Social Democrats	11,002	35.59	+5.73
Progress Party	4,809	15.56	+3.29
Venstre	4,577	14.81	-11.08
Conservatives	2,651	8.58	+3.72
Social Liberals	2,186	7.07	-5.99
Centre Democrats	1,742	5.64	+4.11
Christian People's Party	870	2.81	-1.86
Justice Party of Denmark	856	2.77	+1.37
Green Left	805	2.60	-0.23
Communist Party of Denmark	722	2.34	-0.10
Left Socialists	379	1.23	+0.07
Pensioners' Party	311	1.01	New
Total	30,910		

1975 Danish general election

Parties	Vote		
Parties	Votes	%	+ / -
Social Democrats	8,969	29.86	+2.07
Venstre	7,777	25.89	+9.58
Social Liberals	3,924	13.06	+1.31
Progress Party	3,687	12.27	-4.20
Conservatives	1,460	4.86	-3.86
Christian People's Party	1,402	4.67	+1.03
Green Left	849	2.83	-0.66
Communist Party of Denmark	733	2.44	+0.54
Centre Democrats	461	1.53	-4.98
Justice Party of Denmark	422	1.40	-1.06
Left Socialists	349	1.16	+0.19
Ivan Folmer-Larsen	4	0.01	New
Oscar Andersen	0	0.00	New
E. Just Jensen	0	0.00	New
Gunner Pedersen	0	0.00	New
Hans Clausen Pilegaard	0	0.00	New
Total	30,037		

1973 Danish general election

Parties	Vote		
Parties	Votes	%	+ / -
Social Democrats	7,639	27.79	-8.76
Progress Party	4,527	16.47	New
Venstre	4,483	16.31	-1.44
Social Liberals	3,230	11.75	-12.14
Conservatives	2,398	8.72	-2.65
Centre Democrats	1,790	6.51	New
Christian People's Party	1,001	3.64	+2.12
Green Left	959	3.49	-2.53
Justice Party of Denmark	675	2.46	+1.19
Communist Party of Denmark	523	1.90	+1.14
Left Socialists	266	0.97	+0.10
Total	27,491		

1971 Danish general election

Parties	Vote		
Parties	Votes	%	+ / -
Social Democrats	10,507	36.55	+2.88
Social Liberals	6,867	23.89	-2.19
Venstre	5,102	17.75	-0.88
Conservatives	3,269	11.37	-1.25
Green Left	1,732	6.02	+0.38
Christian People's Party	437	1.52	New
Justice Party of Denmark	366	1.27	+0.79
Left Socialists	249	0.87	-0.01
Communist Party of Denmark	219	0.76	+0.14
Total	28,748		

=== General elections in the 1960s ===
1968 Danish general election

Parties	Vote		
Parties	Votes	%	+ / -
Social Democrats	6,061	33.67	-4.11
Social Liberals	4,694	26.08	+8.81
Venstre	3,354	18.63	-1.37
Conservatives	2,271	12.62	+0.09
Green Left	1,015	5.64	-2.78
Liberal Centre	173	0.96	-0.84
Left Socialists	159	0.88	New
Communist Party of Denmark	112	0.62	+0.20
Justice Party of Denmark	86	0.48	+0.01
Independent Party	74	0.41	-0.90
Total	17,999		

1966 Danish general election

Parties	Vote		
Parties	Votes	%	+ / -
Social Democrats	6,705	37.78	-2.06
Venstre	3,550	20.00	-1.37
Social Liberals	3,066	17.27	+1.39
Conservatives	2,224	12.53	-0.01
Green Left	1,494	8.42	+2.50
Liberal Centre	320	1.80	New
Independent Party	233	1.31	-0.90
Justice Party of Denmark	83	0.47	-0.49
Communist Party of Denmark	74	0.42	-0.20
Total	17,749		

1964 Danish general election

Parties	Vote		
Parties	Votes	%	+ / -
Social Democrats	6,660	39.84	+1.19
Venstre	3,572	21.37	-1.88
Social Liberals	2,654	15.88	-1.54
Conservatives	2,096	12.54	+2.79
Green Left	990	5.92	-0.37
Independent Party	369	2.21	-0.43
Justice Party of Denmark	161	0.96	-0.65
Communist Party of Denmark	104	0.62	+0.22
Peace Politics People's Party	66	0.39	New
Danish Unity	46	0.28	New
Total	16,718		

1960 Danish general election

Parties	Vote		
Parties	Votes	%	+ / -
Social Democrats	6,092	38.65	+2.90
Venstre	3,664	23.25	-3.87
Social Liberals	2,745	17.42	-4.20
Conservatives	1,537	9.75	+2.06
Green Left	991	6.29	New
Independent Party	416	2.64	+0.74
Justice Party of Denmark	253	1.61	-1.56
Communist Party of Denmark	63	0.40	-2.36
Total	15,761		

=== General elections in the 1950s ===
1957 Danish general election

Parties	Vote		
Parties	Votes	%	+ / -
Social Democrats	5,577	35.75	-1.98
Venstre	4,231	27.12	+1.69
Social Liberals	3,373	21.62	-0.51
Conservatives	1,199	7.69	+0.48
Justice Party of Denmark	494	3.17	+0.66
Communist Party of Denmark	430	2.76	-0.10
Independent Party	297	1.90	-0.23
Total	15,601		

September 1953 Danish Folketing election

Parties	Vote		
Parties	Votes	%	+ / -
Social Democrats	5,682	37.73	+1.77
Venstre	3,829	25.43	+1.33
Social Liberals	3,332	22.13	-2.18
Conservatives	1,086	7.21	-0.48
Communist Party of Denmark	431	2.86	-0.60
Justice Party of Denmark	378	2.51	-1.30
Independent Party	321	2.13	New
Total	15,059		

April 1953 Danish Folketing election

Parties	Vote		
Parties	Votes	%	+ / -
Social Democrats	5,143	35.96	+1.81
Social Liberals	3,477	24.31	-0.36
Venstre	3,447	24.10	+0.22
Conservatives	1,100	7.69	-1.06
Justice Party of Denmark	545	3.81	-1.15
Communist Party of Denmark	495	3.46	-0.13
Danish Unity	95	0.66	New
Total	14,302		

1950 Danish Folketing election

Parties	Vote		
Parties	Votes	%	+ / -
Social Democrats	4,930	34.15	-2.31
Social Liberals	3,562	24.67	+4.02
Venstre	3,448	23.88	-3.36
Conservatives	1,263	8.75	+1.83
Justice Party of Denmark	716	4.96	+1.98
Communist Party of Denmark	518	3.59	-1.24
Total	14,437		

=== General elections in the 1940s ===
1947 Danish Folketing election

Parties	Vote		
Parties	Votes	%	+ / -
Social Democrats	5,281	36.46	+6.66
Venstre	3,946	27.24	+2.93
Social Liberals	2,991	20.65	-3.83
Conservatives	1,002	6.92	-2.09
Communist Party of Denmark	700	4.83	-3.39
Justice Party of Denmark	432	2.98	+1.30
Danish Unity	133	0.92	-1.58
Total	14,485		

1945 Danish Folketing election

Parties	Vote		
Parties	Votes	%	+ / -
Social Democrats	4,324	29.80	-8.03
Social Liberals	3,552	24.48	-1.52
Venstre	3,528	24.31	+3.85
Conservatives	1,307	9.01	-2.97
Communist Party of Denmark	1,193	8.22	New
Danish Unity	363	2.50	+1.15
Justice Party of Denmark	244	1.68	+0.44
Total	14,511		

1943 Danish Folketing election

Parties	Vote		
Parties	Votes	%	+ / -
Social Democrats	5,483	37.83	+2.23
Social Liberals	3,769	26.00	+0.38
Venstre	2,965	20.46	+0.02
Conservatives	1,737	11.98	+1.80
Danish Unity	196	1.35	+0.36
Justice Party of Denmark	180	1.24	-0.86
National Socialist Workers' Party of Denmark	106	0.73	-0.53
Farmers' Party	59	0.41	-0.79
Total	14,495		

=== General elections in the 1930s ===
1939 Danish Folketing election

Parties	Vote		
Parties	Votes	%	+ / -
Social Democrats	4,477	35.60	-3.27
Social Liberals	3,222	25.62	-0.59
Venstre	2,571	20.44	-0.06
Conservatives	1,280	10.18	-0.40
Communist Party of Denmark	279	2.22	+1.41
Justice Party of Denmark	264	2.10	+0.42
National Socialist Workers' Party of Denmark	159	1.26	+0.88
Farmers' Party	151	1.20	+0.23
Danish Unity	125	0.99	New
National Cooperation	49	0.39	New
Total	12,577		

1935 Danish Folketing election

Parties	Vote		
Parties	Votes	%	+ / -
Social Democrats	4,866	38.87	+2.23
Social Liberals	3,282	26.21	-0.59
Venstre	2,567	20.50	-4.38
Conservatives	1,325	10.58	+0.62
Justice Party of Denmark	210	1.68	+0.38
Independent People's Party	121	0.97	New
Communist Party of Denmark	101	0.81	+0.38
National Socialist Workers' Party of Denmark	48	0.38	New
Total	12,520		

1932 Danish Folketing election

Parties	Vote		
Parties	Votes	%	+ / -
Social Democrats	4,489	36.64	+3.20
Social Liberals	3,283	26.80	-3.60
Venstre	3,048	24.88	-2.28
Conservatives	1,220	9.96	+2.23
Justice Party of Denmark	159	1.30	+0.60
Communist Party of Denmark	53	0.43	-0.14
Total	12,252		

=== General elections in the 1920s ===
1929 Danish Folketing election

Parties	Vote		
Parties	Votes	%	+ / -
Social Democrats	3,783	33.44	-1.11
Social Liberals	3,440	30.40	+1.46
Venstre	3,073	27.16	+1.20
Conservatives	875	7.73	-2.29
Justice Party of Denmark	79	0.70	+0.40
Communist Party of Denmark	64	0.57	+0.34
Total	11,314		

1926 Danish Folketing election

Parties	Vote		
Parties	Votes	%	+ / -
Social Democrats	3,894	34.55	+5.43
Social Liberals	3,262	28.94	-4.68
Venstre	2,926	25.96	-1.14
Conservatives	1,129	10.02	+0.57
Justice Party of Denmark	34	0.30	+0.07
Communist Party of Denmark	26	0.23	-0.18
Total	11,271		

1924 Danish Folketing election

Parties	Vote		
Parties	Votes	%	+ / -
Social Liberals	3,444	33.62	-1.86
Social Democrats	2,983	29.12	+3.41
Venstre	2,776	27.10	-2.60
Conservatives	968	9.45	+1.21
Communist Party of Denmark	42	0.41	New
Justice Party of Denmark	24	0.23	New
Farmer Party	8	0.08	New
Total	10,245		

September 1920 Danish Folketing election

Parties	Vote		
Parties	Votes	%	+ / -
Social Liberals	3,499	35.48	+1.04
Venstre	2,929	29.70	-2.88
Social Democrats	2,536	25.71	+1.19
Conservatives	813	8.24	+0.10
Free Social Democrats	45	0.46	New
Industry Party	25	0.25	-0.07
Danish Left Socialist Party	15	0.15	New
Total	9,862		

July 1920 Danish Folketing election

Parties	Vote		
Parties	Votes	%	+ / -
Social Liberals	2,787	34.44	+0.05
Venstre	2,637	32.58	+2.50
Social Democrats	1,984	24.52	-1.00
Conservatives	659	8.14	-1.25
Industry Party	26	0.32	New
Niels Madsen	0	0.00	-0.05
C. E. Marott	0	0.00	New
Total	8,093		

April 1920 Danish Folketing election

Parties	Vote	
Parties	Votes	%
Social Liberals	2,897	34.39
Venstre	2,534	30.08
Social Democrats	2,150	25.52
Conservatives	791	9.39
Free Social Democrats	48	0.57
Niels Madsen	4	0.05
Total	8,424	

== European Parliament elections results ==
2024 European Parliament election in Denmark

Parties	Vote		
Parties	Votes	%	+ / -
Social Democrats	5,909	19.87	-6.21
Venstre	5,238	17.61	-7.44
Green Left	4,365	14.68	+4.20
Denmark Democrats	3,093	10.40	New
Conservatives	2,238	7.52	-0.09
Danish People's Party	2,154	7.24	-4.90
Liberal Alliance	1,879	6.32	+4.33
Moderates	1,879	6.32	New
Social Liberals	1,513	5.09	-2.18
Red–Green Alliance	972	3.27	-0.21
The Alternative	501	1.68	-0.33
Total	29,741		

2019 European Parliament election in Denmark

Parties	Vote		
Parties	Votes	%	+ / -
Social Democrats	8,823	26.08	+5.23
Venstre	8,475	25.05	+9.71
Danish People's Party	4,108	12.14	-15.72
Green Left	3,546	10.48	+3.28
Conservatives	2,576	7.61	-9.46
Social Liberals	2,458	7.27	+3.09
People's Movement against the EU	1,312	3.88	-1.80
Red–Green Alliance	1,178	3.48	New
The Alternative	680	2.01	New
Liberal Alliance	672	1.99	+0.17
Total	33,828		

2014 European Parliament election in Denmark

Parties	Vote		
Parties	Votes	%	+ / -
Danish People's Party	7,994	27.86	+13.82
Social Democrats	5,982	20.85	-6.62
Conservatives	4,899	17.07	-0.97
Venstre	4,402	15.34	-4.06
Green Left	2,066	7.20	-4.00
People's Movement against the EU	1,630	5.68	+0.92
Social Liberals	1,200	4.18	+1.45
Liberal Alliance	521	1.82	+1.40
Total	28,694		

2009 European Parliament election in Denmark

Parties	Vote		
Parties	Votes	%	+ / -
Social Democrats	8,315	27.47	-7.84
Venstre	5,874	19.40	-0.74
Conservatives	5,460	18.04	+4.36
Danish People's Party	4,251	14.04	+7.71
Green Left	3,389	11.20	+5.06
People's Movement against the EU	1,441	4.76	+1.17
Social Liberals	825	2.73	-2.69
June Movement	589	1.95	-6.82
Liberal Alliance	128	0.42	New
Total	30,272		

2004 European Parliament election in Denmark

Parties	Vote		
Parties	Votes	%	+ / -
Social Democrats	6,471	35.31	+16.51
Venstre	3,690	20.14	-4.93
Conservatives	2,507	13.68	+4.57
June Movement	1,608	8.77	-6.33
Danish People's Party	1,160	6.33	+0.66
Green Left	1,126	6.14	+0.81
Social Liberals	994	5.42	-4.96
People's Movement against the EU	658	3.59	-2.18
Christian Democrats	112	0.61	-0.88
Total	18,326		

1999 European Parliament election in Denmark

Parties	Vote		
Parties	Votes	%	+ / -
Venstre	4,813	25.07	+3.46
Social Democrats	3,610	18.80	+0.56
June Movement	2,899	15.10	+1.80
Social Liberals	1,993	10.38	-0.05
Conservatives	1,748	9.11	-7.31
People's Movement against the EU	1,107	5.77	-2.20
Danish People's Party	1,088	5.67	New
Green Left	1,023	5.33	-2.40
Centre Democrats	631	3.29	+2.70
Christian Democrats	286	1.49	+0.95
Progress Party	108	0.56	-2.60
Total	19,198		

1994 European Parliament election in Denmark

Parties	Vote		
Parties	Votes	%	+ / -
Venstre	4,427	21.61	+2.28
Social Democrats	3,736	18.24	-8.94
Conservatives	3,363	16.42	+3.65
June Movement	2,724	13.30	New
Social Liberals	2,137	10.43	+5.81
People's Movement against the EU	1,632	7.97	-4.73
Green Left	1,583	7.73	+0.97
Progress Party	648	3.16	-3.09
Centre Democrats	121	0.59	-8.00
Christian Democrats	111	0.54	-1.28
Total	20,482		

1989 European Parliament election in Denmark

Parties	Vote		
Parties	Votes	%	+ / -
Social Democrats	4,739	27.18	+5.33
Venstre	3,371	19.33	+3.39
Conservatives	2,226	12.77	-8.43
People's Movement against the EU	2,214	12.70	-4.31
Centre Democrats	1,497	8.59	+2.05
Green Left	1,178	6.76	+0.52
Progress Party	1,089	6.25	+3.06
Social Liberals	805	4.62	-0.70
Christian Democrats	318	1.82	-0.29
Total	17,437		

1984 European Parliament election in Denmark

Parties	Vote	
Parties	Votes	%
Social Democrats	4,381	21.85
Conservatives	4,251	21.20
People's Movement against the EU	3,410	17.01
Venstre	3,195	15.94
Centre Democrats	1,312	6.54
Green Left	1,251	6.24
Social Liberals	1,067	5.32
Progress Party	639	3.19
Christian Democrats	423	2.11
Left Socialists	121	0.60
Total	20,050	

== Referendums ==
2022 Danish European Union opt-out referendum

Option	Votes	%
✓ YES	23,544	66.01
X NO	12,125	33.99

2015 Danish European Union opt-out referendum

Option	Votes	%
X NO	19,616	53.12
✓ YES	17,315	46.88

2014 Danish Unified Patent Court membership referendum

Option	Votes	%
✓ YES	18,200	65.24
X NO	9,696	34.76

2009 Danish Act of Succession referendum

Option	Votes	%
✓ YES	24,741	85.64
X NO	4,148	14.36

2000 Danish euro referendum

Option	Votes	%
X NO	17,910	52.14
✓ YES	16,442	47.86

1998 Danish Amsterdam Treaty referendum

Option	Votes	%
✓ YES	16,756	56.23
X NO	13,045	43.77

1993 Danish Maastricht Treaty referendum

Option	Votes	%
✓ YES	19,905	59.75
X NO	13,407	40.25

1992 Danish Maastricht Treaty referendum

Option	Votes	%
✓ YES	16,536	51.89
X NO	15,329	48.11

1986 Danish Single European Act referendum

Option	Votes	%
✓ YES	17,765	61.76
X NO	10,999	38.24

1972 Danish European Communities membership referendum

Option	Votes	%
✓ YES	22,038	73.70
X NO	7,863	26.30

1953 Danish constitutional and electoral age referendum

Option	Votes	%
✓ YES	10,890	87.33
X NO	1,580	12.67
21 years	6,903	53.83
23 years	5,920	46.17

1939 Danish constitutional referendum

Option	Votes	%
✓ YES	7,644	90.96
X NO	760	9.04
