= Bispebjerg (nomination district) =

- Bispebjerg
- Nomination district constituency for the Folketing
- Location of Bispebjerg within Copenhagen

- Location of Copenhagen within Denmark
- Municipalities: Copenhagen
- Constituency: Copenhagen
- Electorate: 35,831 (2022)

Current constituency
- Created: 1915

Bispebjerg nominating district (formerly known as Utterslev nominating district) is one of the 92 nominating districts that exists for Danish elections following the 2007 municipal reform. It is one of the 9 nominating districts in Copenhagen Municipality. It was created in 1915, though its boundaries have been changed since then.

In general elections, the district is a very strong area for parties commonly associated with the red bloc, having been the district where they received their second highest vote share in the 2022 election.

== General elections results ==
=== General elections in the 2020s ===
2022 Danish general election

Parties	Vote		
Parties	Votes	%	+ / -
Red–Green Alliance	5,744	20.76	-2.95
Social Democrats	4,923	17.80	+0.72
Green Left	3,454	12.49	+0.21
The Alternative	3,109	11.24	+3.29
Social Liberals	1,881	6.80	-8.72
Moderates	1,842	6.66	New
Liberal Alliance	1,514	5.47	+3.65
Venstre	1,501	5.43	-3.87
Independent Greens	1,273	4.60	New
Conservatives	829	3.00	+0.15
Danish People's Party	504	1.82	-2.41
Denmark Democrats	501	1.81	New
New Right	455	1.64	+0.13
Christian Democrats	80	0.29	-0.74
Flemming Blicher	44	0.16	New
Tom Gillesberg	8	0.03	-0.03
Total	27,662		

=== General elections in the 2010s ===
2019 Danish general election

Parties	Vote		
Parties	Votes	%	+ / -
Red–Green Alliance	6,879	23.71	+1.69
Social Democrats	4,957	17.08	-5.27
Social Liberals	4,503	15.52	+7.64
Green Left	3,563	12.28	+5.45
Venstre	2,700	9.30	+2.02
The Alternative	2,308	7.95	-4.14
Danish People's Party	1,228	4.23	-7.80
Conservatives	827	2.85	+0.78
Liberal Alliance	528	1.82	-4.72
Stram Kurs	443	1.53	New
New Right	437	1.51	New
Christian Democrats	300	1.03	+0.43
Klaus Riskær Pedersen Party	286	0.99	New
Pierre Tavares	27	0.09	New
Tom Gillesberg	16	0.06	+0.01
John Jørgensen	10	0.03	New
Tommy Schou Christesen	4	0.01	New
John Erik Wagner	2	0.01	-0.01
Total	29,018		

2015 Danish general election

Parties	Vote		
Parties	Votes	%	+ / -
Social Democrats	6,251	22.35	+0.84
Red–Green Alliance	6,157	22.02	+1.73
The Alternative	3,381	12.09	New
Danish People's Party	3,363	12.03	+2.39
Social Liberals	2,205	7.88	-6.34
Venstre	2,037	7.28	-3.88
Green Left	1,909	6.83	-7.19
Liberal Alliance	1,829	6.54	+1.89
Conservatives	580	2.07	-1.93
Christian Democrats	169	0.60	+0.21
Kashif Ahmad	64	0.23	New
Tom Gillesberg	13	0.05	+0.01
John Erik Wagner	5	0.02	+0.02
Jan Elkjær	3	0.01	New
Total	27,966		

2011 Danish general election

Parties	Vote		
Parties	Votes	%	+ / -
Social Democrats	5,967	21.51	-5.44
Red–Green Alliance	5,630	20.29	+13.04
Social Liberals	3,945	14.22	+6.67
Green Left	3,891	14.02	-8.92
Venstre	3,095	11.16	+0.17
Danish People's Party	2,675	9.64	-2.94
Liberal Alliance	1,290	4.65	+1.34
Conservatives	1,110	4.00	-3.66
Christian Democrats	107	0.39	-0.34
Klaus Trier Tuxen	13	0.05	New
Tom Gillesberg	12	0.04	+0.02
Mads Vestergaard	6	0.02	New
Morten Versner	2	0.01	New
John Erik Wagner	1	0.00	0.00
Per Zimmermann	1	0.00	New
Total	27,745		

=== General elections in the 2000s ===
2007 Danish general election

Parties	Vote		
Parties	Votes	%	+ / -
Social Democrats	7,207	26.95	+0.05
Green Left	6,133	22.94	+13.34
Danish People's Party	3,363	12.58	-1.46
Venstre	2,938	10.99	-3.18
Conservatives	2,047	7.66	+0.41
Social Liberals	2,020	7.55	-7.47
Red–Green Alliance	1,939	7.25	-2.26
New Alliance	886	3.31	New
Christian Democrats	196	0.73	-0.80
Tom Gillesberg	6	0.02	New
Amir Becirovic	1	0.00	New
Vibeke Baden Laursen	1	0.00	New
Nicolai Krogh Mittet	1	0.00	New
John Erik Wagner	0	0.00	New
Total	26,738		

2005 Danish general election

Parties	Vote		
Parties	Votes	%	+ / -
Social Democrats	3,916	26.90	-4.58
Social Liberals	2,187	15.02	+6.45
Venstre	2,062	14.17	-4.53
Danish People's Party	2,044	14.04	+0.10
Green Left	1,397	9.60	-1.07
Red–Green Alliance	1,385	9.51	+4.10
Conservatives	1,055	7.25	+0.59
Christian Democrats	222	1.53	-0.45
Centre Democrats	177	1.22	-0.87
Minority Party	110	0.76	New
Feride Istogu Gillesberg	2	0.01	New
Total	14,557		

2001 Danish general election

Parties	Vote		
Parties	Votes	%	+ / -
Social Democrats	4,769	31.48	-9.11
Venstre	2,833	18.70	+6.10
Danish People's Party	2,112	13.94	+3.75
Green Left	1,617	10.67	-1.03
Social Liberals	1,298	8.57	+4.28
Conservatives	1,009	6.66	-0.32
Red–Green Alliance	820	5.41	-1.13
Centre Democrats	316	2.09	-1.28
Christian People's Party	300	1.98	+0.25
Progress Party	47	0.31	-1.28
Lars Hutters	28	0.18	New
Total	15,149		

=== General elections in the 1990s ===
1998 Danish general election

Parties	Vote		
Parties	Votes	%	+ / -
Social Democrats	6,135	40.59	-0.65
Venstre	1,904	12.60	+0.84
Green Left	1,769	11.70	+0.29
Danish People's Party	1,540	10.19	New
Conservatives	1,055	6.98	-5.32
Red–Green Alliance	988	6.54	-0.14
Social Liberals	649	4.29	-0.13
Centre Democrats	509	3.37	+0.64
Christian People's Party	262	1.73	+0.63
Progress Party	240	1.59	-5.30
Democratic Renewal	63	0.42	New
Total	15,114		

1994 Danish general election

Parties	Vote		
Parties	Votes	%	+ / -
Social Democrats	6,244	41.24	-7.00
Conservatives	1,863	12.30	+1.00
Venstre	1,780	11.76	+6.28
Green Left	1,727	11.41	-1.80
Progress Party	1,043	6.89	+3.63
Red–Green Alliance	1,012	6.68	+3.68
Social Liberals	669	4.42	+1.78
Centre Democrats	414	2.73	-0.82
Jørgen Tved	172	1.14	New
Christian People's Party	166	1.10	-0.20
Villo Sigurdsson	44	0.29	New
Birgitte Bjerring Sonneby	8	0.05	New
Total	15,142		

1990 Danish general election

Parties	Vote		
Parties	Votes	%	+ / -
Social Democrats	7,674	48.24	+9.86
Green Left	2,101	13.21	-9.08
Conservatives	1,798	11.30	-2.94
Common Course	965	6.07	+2.52
Venstre	872	5.48	+2.86
Centre Democrats	564	3.55	+0.45
Progress Party	518	3.26	-3.63
Red–Green Alliance	477	3.00	New
Social Liberals	420	2.64	-1.69
Christian People's Party	207	1.30	+0.20
The Greens	183	1.15	-0.56
Justice Party of Denmark	105	0.66	New
Abdul Wahid Pedersen	16	0.10	New
Humanist Party	7	0.04	New
Annette Dybdal	2	0.01	New
Total	15,909		

=== General elections in the 1980s ===
1988 Danish general election

Parties	Vote		
Parties	Votes	%	+ / -
Social Democrats	6,715	38.38	+1.82
Green Left	3,899	22.29	-3.15
Conservatives	2,492	14.24	+0.70
Progress Party	1,037	5.93	+2.67
Social Liberals	757	4.33	-0.30
Common Course	621	3.55	-0.26
Centre Democrats	542	3.10	-0.12
Venstre	459	2.62	+0.94
Communist Party of Denmark	321	1.83	-0.05
The Greens	299	1.71	+0.38
Christian People's Party	193	1.10	-0.21
Left Socialists	160	0.91	-1.38
Total	17,495		

1987 Danish general election

Parties	Vote		
Parties	Votes	%	+ / -
Social Democrats	6,507	36.56	-8.83
Green Left	4,528	25.44	+5.96
Conservatives	2,410	13.54	-2.06
Social Liberals	824	4.63	+0.65
Common Course	679	3.81	New
Progress Party	630	3.54	-2.39
Centre Democrats	574	3.22	+0.58
Left Socialists	407	2.29	+1.38
Communist Party of Denmark	335	1.88	+0.13
Venstre	299	1.68	-0.94
The Greens	236	1.33	New
Christian People's Party	233	1.31	+0.21
Justice Party of Denmark	84	0.47	-1.16
Humanist Party	33	0.19	New
Socialist Workers Party	15	0.08	+0.02
Marxist–Leninists Party	5	0.03	-0.03
Total	17,799		

1984 Danish general election

Parties	Vote		
Parties	Votes	%	+ / -
Social Democrats	8,549	45.39	+0.32
Green Left	3,670	19.48	+1.03
Conservatives	2,939	15.60	+5.85
Social Liberals	750	3.98	-0.06
Left Socialists	691	3.67	+1.38
Centre Democrats	498	2.64	-2.08
Progress Party	433	2.30	-1.24
Venstre	377	2.00	-0.38
Communist Party of Denmark	329	1.75	-1.13
Justice Party of Denmark	307	1.63	-0.03
Christian People's Party	270	1.43	+0.23
Socialist Workers Party	12	0.06	-0.05
Marxist–Leninists Party	11	0.06	New
Total	18,836		

1981 Danish general election

Parties	Vote		
Parties	Votes	%	+ / -
Social Democrats	8,234	45.07	-9.23
Green Left	3,371	18.45	+9.78
Conservatives	1,781	9.75	+1.41
Progress Party	1,005	5.50	+3.20
Centre Democrats	862	4.72	+3.11
Social Liberals	739	4.04	-0.22
Left Socialists	733	4.01	+0.34
Communist Party of Denmark	526	2.88	-1.51
Venstre	434	2.38	-0.38
Justice Party of Denmark	304	1.66	-1.24
Christian People's Party	219	1.20	-0.05
Communist Workers Party	42	0.23	-0.59
Socialist Workers Party	20	0.11	New
Total	18,270		

=== General elections in the 1970s ===
1979 Danish general election

Parties	Vote		
Parties	Votes	%	+ / -
Social Democrats	10,367	54.30	+0.01
Green Left	1,655	8.67	+3.31
Conservatives	1,593	8.34	+2.37
Progress Party	1,060	5.55	+0.05
Left Socialists	981	5.14	+1.78
Communist Party of Denmark	838	4.39	-3.75
Social Liberals	813	4.26	+1.90
Justice Party of Denmark	553	2.90	-0.68
Venstre	527	2.76	+0.70
Centre Democrats	308	1.61	-2.61
Christian People's Party	239	1.25	-0.21
Communist Workers Party	157	0.82	New
Leni Thomsen	2	0.01	New
Total	19,093		

1977 Danish general election

Parties	Vote		
Parties	Votes	%	+ / -
Social Democrats	11,011	54.29	+9.32
Communist Party of Denmark	1,652	8.14	-2.04
Progress Party	1,493	7.36	+1.81
Conservatives	1,210	5.97	+1.71
Green Left	1,087	5.36	-3.02
Centre Democrats	856	4.22	+2.78
Justice Party of Denmark	726	3.58	+1.99
Left Socialists	681	3.36	+0.60
Social Liberals	478	2.36	-2.59
Venstre	418	2.06	-8.22
Pensioners' Party	373	1.84	New
Christian People's Party	296	1.46	-1.55
Karen T. Christensen	2	0.01	New
Total	20,283		

1975 Danish general election

Parties	Vote		
Parties	Votes	%	+ / -
Social Democrats	9,376	44.97	+4.36
Venstre	2,143	10.28	+7.46
Communist Party of Denmark	2,123	10.18	+1.01
Green Left	1,747	8.38	-2.29
Progress Party	1,700	8.15	-0.58
Social Liberals	1,032	4.95	-2.03
Conservatives	888	4.26	-3.00
Christian People's Party	628	3.01	+0.88
Left Socialists	575	2.76	+0.69
Justice Party of Denmark	331	1.59	-1.29
Centre Democrats	301	1.44	-5.21
Birgit Busk	5	0.02	New
Total	20,849		

1973 Danish general election

Parties	Vote		
Parties	Votes	%	+ / -
Social Democrats	8,798	40.61	-6.92
Green Left	2,311	10.67	-8.08
Communist Party of Denmark	1,987	9.17	+5.86
Progress Party	1,892	8.73	New
Conservatives	1,572	7.26	-5.23
Social Liberals	1,513	6.98	-3.09
Centre Democrats	1,440	6.65	New
Justice Party of Denmark	623	2.88	+1.57
Venstre	611	2.82	-0.31
Christian People's Party	462	2.13	+1.37
Left Socialists	448	2.07	-0.57
Gunnar Skou	6	0.03	New
Total	21,663		

1971 Danish general election

Parties	Vote		
Parties	Votes	%	+ / -
Social Democrats	10,509	47.53	+3.65
Green Left	4,145	18.75	+6.15
Conservatives	2,762	12.49	-4.94
Social Liberals	2,226	10.07	-3.86
Communist Party of Denmark	732	3.31	+0.30
Venstre	693	3.13	+0.44
Left Socialists	583	2.64	-1.84
Justice Party of Denmark	289	1.31	+1.01
Christian People's Party	168	0.76	New
Kaare Heistein Sørensen	4	0.02	New
Total	22,111		

=== General elections in the 1960s ===
1968 Danish general election

Parties	Vote		
Parties	Votes	%	+ / -
Social Democrats	17,855	43.88	-1.81
Conservatives	7,093	17.43	+2.27
Social Liberals	5,666	13.93	+8.53
Green Left	5,128	12.60	-11.57
Left Socialists	1,823	4.48	New
Communist Party of Denmark	1,225	3.01	+0.77
Venstre	1,096	2.69	-0.77
Liberal Centre	584	1.44	-1.39
Justice Party of Denmark	123	0.30	-0.09
Independent Party	90	0.22	-0.44
Kristine Heide	5	0.01	New
Total	40,688		

1966 Danish general election

Parties	Vote		
Parties	Votes	%	+ / -
Social Democrats	18,780	45.69	-9.05
Green Left	9,934	24.17	+11.28
Conservatives	6,232	15.16	-2.37
Social Liberals	2,221	5.40	+2.00
Venstre	1,422	3.46	-2.13
Liberal Centre	1,165	2.83	New
Communist Party of Denmark	921	2.24	-1.05
Independent Party	273	0.66	-0.61
Justice Party of Denmark	159	0.39	-0.31
Total	41,107		

1964 Danish general election

Parties	Vote		
Parties	Votes	%	+ / -
Social Democrats	22,168	54.74	-0.84
Conservatives	7,097	17.53	+0.30
Green Left	5,219	12.89	-0.90
Venstre	2,262	5.59	+1.30
Social Liberals	1,377	3.40	-0.03
Communist Party of Denmark	1,332	3.29	+0.45
Independent Party	513	1.27	-0.12
Justice Party of Denmark	285	0.70	-0.75
Peace Politics People's Party	154	0.38	New
Danish Unity	89	0.22	New
Total	40,496		

1960 Danish general election

Parties	Vote		
Parties	Votes	%	+ / -
Social Democrats	22,222	55.58	+1.25
Conservatives	6,890	17.23	+0.21
Green Left	5,514	13.79	New
Venstre	1,716	4.29	-2.63
Social Liberals	1,372	3.43	-3.78
Communist Party of Denmark	1,136	2.84	-5.45
Justice Party of Denmark	578	1.45	-3.64
Independent Party	554	1.39	+0.25
Total	39,982		

=== General elections in the 1950s ===
1957 Danish general election

Parties	Vote		
Parties	Votes	%	+ / -
Social Democrats	20,459	54.33	-2.93
Conservatives	6,410	17.02	+0.41
Communist Party of Denmark	3,122	8.29	-3.19
Social Liberals	2,715	7.21	+0.81
Venstre	2,605	6.92	+2.60
Justice Party of Denmark	1,916	5.09	+2.19
Independent Party	429	1.14	+0.11
Total	37,656		

September 1953 Danish Folketing election

Parties	Vote		
Parties	Votes	%	+ / -
Social Democrats	20,833	57.26	+1.27
Conservatives	6,042	16.61	+1.36
Communist Party of Denmark	4,178	11.48	-0.54
Social Liberals	2,330	6.40	-1.17
Venstre	1,571	4.32	+1.15
Justice Party of Denmark	1,055	2.90	-2.26
Independent Party	373	1.03	New
Total	36,382		

April 1953 Danish Folketing election

Parties	Vote		
Parties	Votes	%	+ / -
Social Democrats	20,255	55.99	+1.43
Conservatives	5,515	15.25	-0.28
Communist Party of Denmark	4,348	12.02	-0.18
Social Liberals	2,740	7.57	+0.86
Justice Party of Denmark	1,868	5.16	-4.06
Venstre	1,147	3.17	+1.40
Danish Unity	302	0.83	New
Total	36,175		

1950 Danish Folketing election

Parties	Vote		
Parties	Votes	%	+ / -
Social Democrats	18,881	54.56	+2.20
Conservatives	5,374	15.53	+1.77
Communist Party of Denmark	4,223	12.20	-2.27
Justice Party of Denmark	3,191	9.22	+4.55
Social Liberals	2,322	6.71	+1.09
Venstre	612	1.77	-5.96
Total	34,603		

=== General elections in the 1940s ===
1947 Danish Folketing election

Parties	Vote		
Parties	Votes	%	+ / -
Social Democrats	35,003	52.36	+12.63
Communist Party of Denmark	9,674	14.47	-9.73
Conservatives	9,202	13.76	-8.63
Capital Venstre	5,167	7.73	+4.57
Social Liberals	3,759	5.62	+0.01
Justice Party of Denmark	3,121	4.67	+3.58
Danish Unity	929	1.39	-2.43
Total	66,855		

1945 Danish Folketing election

Parties	Vote		
Parties	Votes	%	+ / -
Social Democrats	26,128	39.73	-21.46
Communist Party of Denmark	15,915	24.20	New
Conservatives	14,722	22.39	-1.57
Social Liberals	3,688	5.61	-1.57
Danish Unity	2,513	3.82	+0.82
Venstre	2,079	3.16	+2.46
Justice Party of Denmark	716	1.09	-0.20
Total	65,761		

1943 Danish Folketing election

Parties	Vote		
Parties	Votes	%	+ / -
Social Democrats	38,636	61.19	-2.81
Conservatives	15,129	23.96	+6.25
Social Liberals	4,535	7.18	-1.32
Danish Unity	1,894	3.00	+2.47
National Socialist Workers' Party of Denmark	1,685	2.67	+0.95
Justice Party of Denmark	817	1.29	+0.38
Venstre	443	0.70	-0.06
Total	63,139		

=== General elections in the 1930s ===
1939 Danish Folketing election

Parties	Vote		
Parties	Votes	%	+ / -
Social Democrats	30,375	64.00	-4.66
Conservatives	8,407	17.71	+0.45
Social Liberals	4,034	8.50	+1.01
Communist Party of Denmark	2,278	4.80	+0.93
National Socialist Workers' Party of Denmark	815	1.72	+1.19
National Cooperation	505	1.06	New
Justice Party of Denmark	432	0.91	-0.93
Venstre	362	0.76	+0.40
Danish Unity	252	0.53	New
Total	47,460		

1935 Danish Folketing election

Parties	Vote		
Parties	Votes	%	+ / -
Social Democrats	28,915	68.66	+1.95
Conservatives	7,269	17.26	-2.84
Social Liberals	3,153	7.49	+0.86
Communist Party of Denmark	1,628	3.87	+0.86
Justice Party of Denmark	774	1.84	-0.43
National Socialist Workers' Party of Denmark	222	0.53	New
Venstre	151	0.36	-0.88
Total	42,112		

1932 Danish Folketing election

Parties	Vote		
Parties	Votes	%	+ / -
Social Democrats	21,975	66.71	-1.54
Conservatives	6,622	20.10	+0.55
Social Liberals	2,185	6.63	-0.46
Communist Party of Denmark	991	3.01	+2.31
Justice Party of Denmark	749	2.27	+0.53
Venstre	407	1.24	-1.44
N. P. J. Andersen	13	0.04	New
Total	32,942		

=== General elections in the 1920s ===
1929 Danish Folketing election

Parties	Vote		
Parties	Votes	%	+ / -
Social Democrats	18,992	68.25	+5.74
Conservatives	5,440	19.55	-4.21
Social Liberals	1,973	7.09	-1.69
Venstre	746	2.68	+0.80
Justice Party of Denmark	484	1.74	+0.17
Communist Party of Denmark	194	0.70	-0.79
Total	27,829		

1926 Danish Folketing election

Parties	Vote		
Parties	Votes	%	+ / -
Social Democrats	14,852	62.51	-2.35
Conservatives	5,645	23.76	+3.06
Social Liberals	2,086	8.78	-0.13
Venstre	447	1.88	-0.11
Justice Party of Denmark	374	1.57	+0.30
Communist Party of Denmark	354	1.49	-0.04
Total	23,758		

1924 Danish Folketing election

Parties	Vote		
Parties	Votes	%	+ / -
Social Democrats	13,842	64.86	+2.78
Conservatives	4,417	20.70	+2.00
Social Liberals	1,902	8.91	+1.23
Venstre	424	1.99	-1.51
Communist Party of Denmark	327	1.53	New
Justice Party of Denmark	271	1.27	New
Industry Party	158	0.74	-4.50
Total	21,341		

September 1920 Danish Folketing election

Parties	Vote		
Parties	Votes	%	+ / -
Social Democrats	10,758	62.08	+1.29
Conservatives	3,240	18.70	-1.56
Social Liberals	1,330	7.68	+0.99
Industry Party	908	5.24	-1.18
Venstre	607	3.50	-1.09
Free Social Democrats	259	1.49	New
Danish Left Socialist Party	226	1.30	New
Total	17,328		

July 1920 Danish Folketing election

Parties	Vote		
Parties	Votes	%	+ / -
Social Democrats	7,862	60.79	+4.30
Conservatives	2,621	20.26	+0.76
Social Liberals	865	6.69	-0.54
Industry Party	830	6.42	-1.27
Venstre	594	4.59	+0.02
Ernst Christiansen	124	0.96	-0.13
H. N. Krogsager	31	0.24	New
A. B. Storgaard-Nielsen	4	0.03	New
Karl Jensen	3	0.02	New
Total	12,934		

April 1920 Danish Folketing election

Parties	Vote	
Parties	Votes	%
Social Democrats	8,310	56.49
Conservatives	2,868	19.50
Industry Party	1,132	7.69
Social Liberals	1,063	7.23
Venstre	672	4.57
Free Social Democrats	253	1.72
Centrum	252	1.71
Ernst Christiansen	161	1.09
Total	14,711	

== European Parliament elections results ==
2024 European Parliament election in Denmark

Parties	Vote		
Parties	Votes	%	+ / -
Green Left	5,904	28.28	+3.12
Red–Green Alliance	5,359	25.67	+10.13
Social Liberals	1,992	9.54	-5.19
Social Democrats	1,929	9.24	-5.30
The Alternative	1,470	7.04	-1.22
Conservatives	988	4.73	+0.98
Venstre	845	4.05	-2.92
Liberal Alliance	764	3.66	+2.32
Danish People's Party	726	3.48	-1.77
Moderates	632	3.03	New
Denmark Democrats	265	1.27	New
Total	20,874		

2019 European Parliament election in Denmark

Parties	Vote		
Parties	Votes	%	+ / -
Green Left	5,796	25.16	+3.62
Red–Green Alliance	3,581	15.54	New
Social Liberals	3,394	14.73	+3.97
Social Democrats	3,350	14.54	-3.96
The Alternative	1,903	8.26	New
Venstre	1,605	6.97	+0.33
Danish People's Party	1,210	5.25	-12.41
People's Movement against the EU	1,030	4.47	-12.81
Conservatives	864	3.75	-1.17
Liberal Alliance	308	1.34	-1.34
Total	23,041		

2014 European Parliament election in Denmark

Parties	Vote		
Parties	Votes	%	+ / -
Green Left	3,754	21.54	-4.51
Social Democrats	3,224	18.50	-2.40
Danish People's Party	3,078	17.66	+5.27
People's Movement against the EU	3,012	17.28	+2.85
Social Liberals	1,876	10.76	+4.19
Venstre	1,158	6.64	-1.94
Conservatives	858	4.92	-2.54
Liberal Alliance	467	2.68	+1.82
Total	17,427		

2009 European Parliament election in Denmark

Parties	Vote		
Parties	Votes	%	+ / -
Green Left	4,384	26.05	+12.25
Social Democrats	3,517	20.90	-12.73
People's Movement against the EU	2,428	14.43	+4.34
Danish People's Party	2,084	12.39	+5.18
Venstre	1,443	8.58	+0.33
Conservatives	1,255	7.46	+0.30
Social Liberals	1,106	6.57	-2.94
June Movement	465	2.76	-6.19
Liberal Alliance	144	0.86	New
Total	16,826		

2004 European Parliament election in Denmark

Parties	Vote		
Parties	Votes	%	+ / -
Social Democrats	2,674	33.63	+16.76
Green Left	1,097	13.80	+3.52
People's Movement against the EU	802	10.09	-2.67
Social Liberals	756	9.51	-0.78
June Movement	712	8.95	-10.07
Venstre	656	8.25	-3.59
Danish People's Party	573	7.21	-0.79
Conservatives	569	7.16	+1.23
Christian Democrats	112	1.41	-0.42
Total	7,951		

1999 European Parliament election in Denmark

Parties	Vote		
Parties	Votes	%	+ / -
June Movement	1,684	19.02	-0.29
Social Democrats	1,494	16.87	-0.65
People's Movement against the EU	1,130	12.76	-6.86
Venstre	1,048	11.84	+3.69
Social Liberals	911	10.29	+2.35
Green Left	910	10.28	-0.80
Danish People's Party	708	8.00	New
Conservatives	525	5.93	-5.57
Centre Democrats	283	3.20	+2.05
Christian Democrats	162	1.83	+1.01
Progress Party	44	0.50	-2.41
Total	8,855		

1994 European Parliament election in Denmark

Parties	Vote		
Parties	Votes	%	+ / -
People's Movement against the EU	1,893	19.62	-13.88
June Movement	1,863	19.31	New
Social Democrats	1,690	17.52	-11.32
Conservatives	1,110	11.50	+3.04
Green Left	1,069	11.08	-1.58
Venstre	786	8.15	+3.46
Social Liberals	766	7.94	+6.27
Progress Party	281	2.91	-0.51
Centre Democrats	111	1.15	-4.06
Christian Democrats	79	0.82	-0.75
Total	9,648		

1989 European Parliament election in Denmark

Parties	Vote		
Parties	Votes	%	+ / -
People's Movement against the EU	3,339	33.50	+1.55
Social Democrats	2,874	28.84	+1.26
Green Left	1,262	12.66	-3.16
Conservatives	843	8.46	-3.58
Centre Democrats	519	5.21	+1.49
Venstre	467	4.69	+2.96
Progress Party	341	3.42	+0.74
Social Liberals	166	1.67	-0.08
Christian Democrats	156	1.57	+0.42
Total	9,967		

1984 European Parliament election in Denmark

Parties	Vote	
Parties	Votes	%
People's Movement against the EU	3,757	31.95
Social Democrats	3,243	27.58
Green Left	1,860	15.82
Conservatives	1,416	12.04
Centre Democrats	438	3.72
Progress Party	315	2.68
Social Liberals	206	1.75
Venstre	204	1.73
Left Socialists	185	1.57
Christian Democrats	135	1.15
Total	11,759	

== Referendums ==
2022 Danish European Union opt-out referendum

Option	Votes	%
✓ YES	12,065	60.48
X NO	7,885	39.52

2015 Danish European Union opt-out referendum

Option	Votes	%
X NO	12,599	57.69
✓ YES	9,239	42.31

2014 Danish Unified Patent Court membership referendum

Option	Votes	%
✓ YES	8,687	50.81
X NO	8,409	49.19

2009 Danish Act of Succession referendum

Option	Votes	%
✓ YES	11,410	82.38
X NO	2,441	17.62

2000 Danish euro referendum

Option	Votes	%
X NO	9,590	61.29
✓ YES	6,056	38.71

1998 Danish Amsterdam Treaty referendum

Option	Votes	%
X NO	7,551	56.44
✓ YES	5,827	43.56

1993 Danish Maastricht Treaty referendum

Option	Votes	%
X NO	9,546	59.07
✓ YES	6,615	40.93

1992 Danish Maastricht Treaty referendum

Option	Votes	%
X NO	10,555	66.58
✓ YES	5,298	33.42

1986 Danish Single European Act referendum

Option	Votes	%
X NO	10,794	68.67
✓ YES	4,925	31.33

1972 Danish European Communities membership referendum

Option	Votes	%
X NO	12,679	54.34
✓ YES	10,653	45.66

1953 Danish constitutional and electoral age referendum

Option	Votes	%
✓ YES	20,065	74.80
X NO	6,760	25.20
21 years	16,297	58.91
23 years	11,367	41.09

1939 Danish constitutional referendum

Option	Votes	%
✓ YES	41,138	96.54
X NO	1,475	3.46
