= Nørrebro (nomination district) =

- Nørrebro
- Nomination district constituency for the Folketing
- Location of Nørrebro within Copenhagen

- Location of Copenhagen within Denmark
- Municipalities: Copenhagen
- Constituency: Copenhagen
- Electorate: 54,529 (2022)

Current constituency
- Created: 1915

Nørrebro nominating district is one of the 92 nominating districts that exists for Danish elections following the 2007 municipal reform. It is one of the 9 nominating districts in Copenhagen Municipality. It was created in 1915, though its boundaries have been changed since then.

In general elections, the district is an extremely strong area for parties commonly associated with the red bloc, with them having won 77.1% of the vote in the 2022 election, the highest any bloc received in a nominating district that year.

== General elections results ==
=== General elections in the 2020s ===
2022 Danish general election

Parties	Vote		
Parties	Votes	%	+ / -
Red–Green Alliance	10,750	23.72	-4.80
The Alternative	6,947	15.33	+5.41
Green Left	5,694	12.56	-0.59
Social Democrats	5,660	12.49	+0.67
Social Liberals	3,967	8.75	-10.36
Moderates	3,279	7.23	New
Liberal Alliance	2,498	5.51	+3.88
Venstre	2,320	5.12	-3.45
Independent Greens	1,836	4.05	New
Conservatives	1,123	2.48	+0.23
New Right	370	0.82	+0.04
Denmark Democrats	358	0.79	New
Danish People's Party	352	0.78	-1.17
Christian Democrats	75	0.17	-0.30
Flemming Blicher	68	0.15	New
Tom Gillesberg	26	0.06	-0.01
Total	45,323		

=== General elections in the 2010s ===
2019 Danish general election

Parties	Vote		
Parties	Votes	%	+ / -
Red–Green Alliance	13,550	28.52	+2.02
Social Liberals	9,076	19.11	+8.14
Green Left	6,245	13.15	+5.63
Social Democrats	5,613	11.82	-5.64
The Alternative	4,714	9.92	-7.97
Venstre	4,071	8.57	+2.70
Conservatives	1,071	2.25	+0.72
Danish People's Party	928	1.95	-3.47
Liberal Alliance	776	1.63	-4.64
Klaus Riskær Pedersen Party	408	0.86	New
Stram Kurs	381	0.80	New
New Right	371	0.78	New
Christian Democrats	223	0.47	+0.18
Tom Gillesberg	33	0.07	+0.02
Pierre Tavares	27	0.06	New
John Jørgensen	17	0.04	New
John Erik Wagner	1	0.00	-0.02
Tommy Schou Christesen	0	0.00	New
Total	47,505		

2015 Danish general election

Parties	Vote		
Parties	Votes	%	+ / -
Red–Green Alliance	12,239	26.50	-1.12
The Alternative	8,262	17.89	New
Social Democrats	8,061	17.46	+1.29
Social Liberals	5,065	10.97	-9.00
Green Left	3,471	7.52	-7.69
Liberal Alliance	2,895	6.27	+1.80
Venstre	2,710	5.87	-2.49
Danish People's Party	2,502	5.42	+0.71
Conservatives	706	1.53	-1.60
Christian Democrats	133	0.29	+0.06
Kashif Ahmad	100	0.22	New
Tom Gillesberg	24	0.05	0.00
John Erik Wagner	7	0.02	+0.01
Jan Elkjær	3	0.01	New
Total	46,178		

2011 Danish general election

Parties	Vote		
Parties	Votes	%	+ / -
Red–Green Alliance	12,382	27.62	+15.32
Social Liberals	8,952	19.97	+8.96
Social Democrats	7,249	16.17	-6.53
Green Left	6,821	15.21	-12.12
Venstre	3,748	8.36	-0.19
Danish People's Party	2,112	4.71	-2.29
Liberal Alliance	2,003	4.47	+0.29
Conservatives	1,404	3.13	-3.34
Christian Democrats	103	0.23	-0.17
Tom Gillesberg	22	0.05	+0.02
Klaus Trier Tuxen	22	0.05	New
Mads Vestergaard	5	0.01	New
Morten Versner	4	0.01	New
John Erik Wagner	3	0.01	+0.01
Per Zimmermann	1	0.00	New
Total	44,831		

=== General elections in the 2000s ===
2007 Danish general election

Parties	Vote		
Parties	Votes	%	+ / -
Green Left	11,339	27.33	+15.39
Social Democrats	9,420	22.70	+1.83
Red–Green Alliance	5,106	12.30	-1.63
Social Liberals	4,570	11.01	-12.96
Venstre	3,549	8.55	-3.15
Danish People's Party	2,906	7.00	-0.54
Conservatives	2,683	6.47	-0.29
New Alliance	1,736	4.18	New
Christian Democrats	166	0.40	-0.45
Tom Gillesberg	13	0.03	New
Amir Becirovic	4	0.01	New
Vibeke Baden Laursen	2	0.00	New
John Erik Wagner	2	0.00	New
Nicolai Krogh Mittet	0	0.00	New
Total	41,496		

2005 Danish general election

Parties	Vote		
Parties	Votes	%	+ / -
Social Liberals	3,701	23.97	+8.69
Social Democrats	3,223	20.87	-4.81
Red–Green Alliance	2,151	13.93	+4.59
Green Left	1,843	11.94	-3.03
Venstre	1,806	11.70	-4.13
Danish People's Party	1,164	7.54	-0.52
Conservatives	1,043	6.76	+0.69
Centre Democrats	221	1.43	-1.59
Minority Party	155	1.00	New
Christian Democrats	131	0.85	-0.48
Feride Istogu Gillesberg	2	0.01	New
Total	15,440		

2001 Danish general election

Parties	Vote		
Parties	Votes	%	+ / -
Social Democrats	3,969	25.68	-6.74
Venstre	2,446	15.83	+4.00
Social Liberals	2,361	15.28	+7.03
Green Left	2,314	14.97	-1.40
Red–Green Alliance	1,443	9.34	-2.05
Danish People's Party	1,245	8.06	+1.62
Conservatives	938	6.07	-0.66
Centre Democrats	467	3.02	-0.83
Christian People's Party	205	1.33	-0.02
Progress Party	51	0.33	-0.66
Lars Hutters	16	0.10	New
Total	15,455		

=== General elections in the 1990s ===
1998 Danish general election

Parties	Vote		
Parties	Votes	%	+ / -
Social Democrats	4,890	32.42	+1.01
Green Left	2,469	16.37	+0.44
Venstre	1,785	11.83	+0.28
Red–Green Alliance	1,718	11.39	-0.90
Social Liberals	1,244	8.25	+0.42
Conservatives	1,015	6.73	-4.36
Danish People's Party	971	6.44	New
Centre Democrats	581	3.85	+1.18
Christian People's Party	204	1.35	-0.02
Progress Party	150	0.99	-3.86
Democratic Renewal	57	0.38	New
Total	15,084		

1994 Danish general election

Parties	Vote		
Parties	Votes	%	+ / -
Social Democrats	4,505	31.41	-7.15
Green Left	2,285	15.93	-3.34
Red–Green Alliance	1,763	12.29	+5.85
Venstre	1,656	11.55	+4.39
Conservatives	1,590	11.09	+1.10
Social Liberals	1,123	7.83	+3.59
Progress Party	696	4.85	+2.27
Centre Democrats	383	2.67	+0.04
Christian People's Party	196	1.37	+0.18
Jørgen Tved	87	0.61	New
Villo Sigurdsson	51	0.36	New
Birgitte Bjerring Sonneby	8	0.06	New
Total	14,343		

1990 Danish general election

Parties	Vote		
Parties	Votes	%	+ / -
Social Democrats	5,641	38.56	+10.66
Green Left	2,819	19.27	-11.47
Conservatives	1,462	9.99	-1.62
Venstre	1,048	7.16	+3.70
Red–Green Alliance	942	6.44	New
Common Course	729	4.98	+1.17
Social Liberals	620	4.24	-2.11
Centre Democrats	385	2.63	+0.63
Progress Party	377	2.58	-2.27
The Greens	301	2.06	-0.82
Christian People's Party	174	1.19	+0.18
Justice Party of Denmark	93	0.64	New
Abdul Wahid Pedersen	25	0.17	New
Humanist Party	13	0.09	New
Annette Dybdal	2	0.01	New
Total	14,631		

=== General elections in the 1980s ===
1988 Danish general election

Parties	Vote		
Parties	Votes	%	+ / -
Green Left	4,741	30.74	-0.89
Social Democrats	4,303	27.90	+1.32
Conservatives	1,791	11.61	+0.52
Social Liberals	980	6.35	+0.21
Progress Party	756	4.90	+2.32
Common Course	588	3.81	+0.08
Venstre	534	3.46	+1.04
Left Socialists	447	2.90	-3.35
The Greens	445	2.88	+0.03
Communist Party of Denmark	376	2.44	-0.05
Centre Democrats	308	2.00	+0.08
Christian People's Party	156	1.01	-0.12
Total	15,425		

1987 Danish general election

Parties	Vote		
Parties	Votes	%	+ / -
Green Left	4,883	31.63	+6.26
Social Democrats	4,103	26.58	-10.60
Conservatives	1,712	11.09	-1.43
Left Socialists	965	6.25	+3.35
Social Liberals	948	6.14	+2.31
Common Course	575	3.73	New
The Greens	440	2.85	New
Progress Party	408	2.64	-2.26
Communist Party of Denmark	385	2.49	+0.31
Venstre	374	2.42	-1.04
Centre Democrats	297	1.92	+0.12
Christian People's Party	175	1.13	+0.12
Justice Party of Denmark	78	0.51	-1.41
Humanist Party	57	0.37	New
Socialist Workers Party	22	0.14	-0.04
Marxist–Leninists Party	14	0.09	-0.08
Total	15,436		

1984 Danish general election

Parties	Vote		
Parties	Votes	%	+ / -
Social Democrats	5,855	37.18	-1.83
Green Left	3,996	25.37	+2.26
Conservatives	1,972	12.52	+4.82
Left Socialists	1,487	9.44	+3.19
Social Liberals	603	3.83	+0.52
Venstre	393	2.50	+0.56
Communist Party of Denmark	343	2.18	-0.87
Justice Party of Denmark	302	1.92	+0.08
Centre Democrats	283	1.80	-1.35
Progress Party	274	1.74	-0.90
Christian People's Party	187	1.19	+0.27
Socialist Workers Party	28	0.18	-0.05
Marxist–Leninists Party	26	0.17	New
Total	15,749		

1981 Danish general election

Parties	Vote		
Parties	Votes	%	+ / -
Social Democrats	5,931	39.01	-9.32
Green Left	3,513	23.11	+10.99
Left Socialists	1,642	10.80	+1.36
Conservatives	1,171	7.70	+1.61
Progress Party	689	4.53	+2.79
Social Liberals	504	3.31	-0.06
Centre Democrats	479	3.15	+2.12
Communist Party of Denmark	463	3.05	-2.15
Venstre	295	1.94	-0.28
Justice Party of Denmark	279	1.84	-1.20
Christian People's Party	140	0.92	-0.13
Communist Workers Party	63	0.41	-1.13
Socialist Workers Party	35	0.23	New
Total	15,204		

=== General elections in the 1970s ===
1979 Danish general election

Parties	Vote		
Parties	Votes	%	+ / -
Social Democrats	7,813	48.33	-1.36
Green Left	1,960	12.12	+3.95
Left Socialists	1,764	10.91	+3.96
Conservatives	984	6.09	+1.86
Communist Party of Denmark	840	5.20	-5.11
Progress Party	818	5.06	+0.53
Social Liberals	545	3.37	+1.00
Justice Party of Denmark	491	3.04	-0.75
Venstre	359	2.22	+0.09
Communist Workers Party	249	1.54	New
Christian People's Party	169	1.05	-0.03
Centre Democrats	167	1.03	-1.37
Leni Thomsen	7	0.04	New
Total	16,166		

1977 Danish general election

Parties	Vote		
Parties	Votes	%	+ / -
Social Democrats	8,477	49.69	+6.79
Communist Party of Denmark	1,759	10.31	-2.01
Green Left	1,394	8.17	-2.43
Progress Party	1,231	7.22	+2.16
Left Socialists	1,185	6.95	+1.44
Conservatives	722	4.23	+0.85
Justice Party of Denmark	646	3.79	+2.20
Centre Democrats	409	2.40	+1.52
Social Liberals	405	2.37	-2.05
Venstre	364	2.13	-6.12
Pensioners' Party	274	1.61	New
Christian People's Party	185	1.08	-1.15
Karen T. Christensen	8	0.05	New
Total	17,059		

1975 Danish general election

Parties	Vote		
Parties	Votes	%	+ / -
Social Democrats	7,486	42.90	+3.65
Communist Party of Denmark	2,150	12.32	+1.55
Green Left	1,850	10.60	-3.27
Venstre	1,439	8.25	+5.73
Progress Party	1,371	7.86	-0.71
Left Socialists	961	5.51	+2.49
Social Liberals	772	4.42	-2.04
Conservatives	590	3.38	-2.35
Christian People's Party	389	2.23	+0.64
Justice Party of Denmark	278	1.59	-1.08
Centre Democrats	154	0.88	-4.63
Birgit Busk	10	0.06	New
Total	17,450		

1973 Danish general election

Parties	Vote		
Parties	Votes	%	+ / -
Social Democrats	7,142	39.25	-8.69
Green Left	2,523	13.87	-7.34
Communist Party of Denmark	1,960	10.77	+7.54
Progress Party	1,559	8.57	New
Social Liberals	1,176	6.46	-2.11
Conservatives	1,042	5.73	-4.45
Centre Democrats	1,003	5.51	New
Left Socialists	549	3.02	-1.20
Justice Party of Denmark	486	2.67	+1.33
Venstre	458	2.52	-0.02
Christian People's Party	289	1.59	+0.87
Gunnar Skou	9	0.05	New
Total	18,196		

1971 Danish general election

Parties	Vote		
Parties	Votes	%	+ / -
Social Democrats	8,913	47.94	+5.51
Green Left	3,944	21.21	-1.43
Conservatives	1,892	10.18	-1.89
Social Liberals	1,593	8.57	-2.40
Left Socialists	785	4.22	-0.68
Communist Party of Denmark	601	3.23	+0.24
Venstre	472	2.54	+0.28
Justice Party of Denmark	249	1.34	+0.95
Christian People's Party	134	0.72	New
Kaare Heistein Sørensen	8	0.04	New
Total	18,591		

=== General elections in the 1960s ===
1968 Danish general election

Parties	Vote		
Parties	Votes	%	+ / -
Social Democrats	8,249	42.43	-6.95
Green Left	4,401	22.64	-4.82
Conservatives	2,346	12.07	+1.15
Social Liberals	2,133	10.97	+6.99
Left Socialists	953	4.90	New
Communist Party of Denmark	581	2.99	+1.07
Venstre	440	2.26	-0.73
Liberal Centre	229	1.18	-1.46
Justice Party of Denmark	76	0.39	+0.08
Independent Party	32	0.16	-0.24
Kristine Heide	2	0.01	New
Total	19,442		

1966 Danish general election

Parties	Vote		
Parties	Votes	%	+ / -
Social Democrats	8,844	49.38	-10.10
Green Left	4,918	27.46	+11.87
Conservatives	1,956	10.92	-1.58
Social Liberals	713	3.98	+1.43
Venstre	535	2.99	-1.77
Liberal Centre	473	2.64	New
Communist Party of Denmark	343	1.92	-1.20
Independent Party	72	0.40	-0.62
Justice Party of Denmark	56	0.31	-0.20
Total	17,910		

1964 Danish general election

Parties	Vote		
Parties	Votes	%	+ / -
Social Democrats	10,528	59.48	-2.38
Green Left	2,760	15.59	-0.02
Conservatives	2,213	12.50	+1.08
Venstre	843	4.76	+1.02
Communist Party of Denmark	553	3.12	+0.54
Social Liberals	451	2.55	+0.09
Independent Party	180	1.02	-0.19
Justice Party of Denmark	91	0.51	-0.62
Peace Politics People's Party	44	0.25	New
Danish Unity	36	0.20	New
Total	17,699		

1960 Danish general election

Parties	Vote		
Parties	Votes	%	+ / -
Social Democrats	10,982	61.86	-1.16
Green Left	2,771	15.61	New
Conservatives	2,028	11.42	-0.90
Venstre	664	3.74	-1.85
Communist Party of Denmark	458	2.58	-5.92
Social Liberals	437	2.46	-3.03
Independent Party	214	1.21	+0.23
Justice Party of Denmark	200	1.13	-2.96
Total	17,754		

=== General elections in the 1950s ===
1957 Danish general election

Parties	Vote		
Parties	Votes	%	+ / -
Social Democrats	11,178	63.02	-1.98
Conservatives	2,185	12.32	-0.19
Communist Party of Denmark	1,508	8.50	-2.81
Venstre	992	5.59	+2.01
Social Liberals	973	5.49	+1.09
Justice Party of Denmark	726	4.09	+1.76
Independent Party	174	0.98	+0.11
Total	17,736		

September 1953 Danish Folketing election

Parties	Vote		
Parties	Votes	%	+ / -
Social Democrats	11,614	65.00	+0.65
Conservatives	2,236	12.51	+0.96
Communist Party of Denmark	2,020	11.31	-0.03
Social Liberals	787	4.40	-0.92
Venstre	639	3.58	+0.76
Justice Party of Denmark	416	2.33	-1.74
Independent Party	156	0.87	New
Total	17,868		

April 1953 Danish Folketing election

Parties	Vote		
Parties	Votes	%	+ / -
Social Democrats	11,484	64.35	+0.66
Conservatives	2,062	11.55	+0.23
Communist Party of Denmark	2,024	11.34	-0.14
Social Liberals	949	5.32	+0.57
Justice Party of Denmark	727	4.07	-3.23
Venstre	503	2.82	+1.37
Danish Unity	98	0.55	New
Total	17,847		

1950 Danish Folketing election

Parties	Vote		
Parties	Votes	%	+ / -
Social Democrats	11,477	63.69	+0.03
Communist Party of Denmark	2,069	11.48	-4.06
Conservatives	2,039	11.32	+2.64
Justice Party of Denmark	1,316	7.30	+4.18
Social Liberals	856	4.75	+1.27
Venstre	262	1.45	-3.19
Total	18,019		

=== General elections in the 1940s ===
1947 Danish Folketing election

Parties	Vote		
Parties	Votes	%	+ / -
Social Democrats	12,260	63.66	+12.58
Communist Party of Denmark	2,993	15.54	-9.90
Conservatives	1,671	8.68	-5.68
Capital Venstre	893	4.64	+2.49
Social Liberals	670	3.48	-0.57
Justice Party of Denmark	601	3.12	+2.25
Danish Unity	171	0.89	-1.15
Total	19,259		

1945 Danish Folketing election

Parties	Vote		
Parties	Votes	%	+ / -
Social Democrats	10,026	51.08	-22.71
Communist Party of Denmark	4,994	25.44	New
Conservatives	2,819	14.36	-1.12
Social Liberals	794	4.05	-1.67
Venstre	422	2.15	+1.66
Danish Unity	401	2.04	+0.18
Justice Party of Denmark	171	0.87	+0.19
Total	19,627		

1943 Danish Folketing election

Parties	Vote		
Parties	Votes	%	+ / -
Social Democrats	14,559	73.79	-1.45
Conservatives	3,055	15.48	+5.35
Social Liberals	1,128	5.72	-0.17
National Socialist Workers' Party of Denmark	389	1.97	+0.72
Danish Unity	367	1.86	+1.56
Justice Party of Denmark	134	0.68	+0.01
Venstre	97	0.49	-0.10
Total	19,729		

=== General elections in the 1930s ===
1939 Danish Folketing election

Parties	Vote		
Parties	Votes	%	+ / -
Social Democrats	13,352	75.24	-3.36
Conservatives	1,798	10.13	-0.09
Social Liberals	1,046	5.89	+0.35
Communist Party of Denmark	978	5.51	+1.61
National Socialist Workers' Party of Denmark	221	1.25	+0.83
Justice Party of Denmark	119	0.67	-0.33
Venstre	104	0.59	+0.25
National Cooperation	75	0.42	New
Danish Unity	53	0.30	New
Total	17,746		

1935 Danish Folketing election

Parties	Vote		
Parties	Votes	%	+ / -
Social Democrats	14,710	78.60	+0.55
Conservatives	1,912	10.22	-2.31
Social Liberals	1,036	5.54	+1.52
Communist Party of Denmark	729	3.90	+0.33
Justice Party of Denmark	187	1.00	-0.15
National Socialist Workers' Party of Denmark	78	0.42	New
Venstre	64	0.34	-0.29
Total	18,716		

1932 Danish Folketing election

Parties	Vote		
Parties	Votes	%	+ / -
Social Democrats	14,083	78.05	-1.41
Conservatives	2,261	12.53	+0.39
Social Liberals	726	4.02	-0.59
Communist Party of Denmark	644	3.57	+2.61
Justice Party of Denmark	208	1.15	-0.15
Venstre	114	0.63	-0.90
N. P. J. Andersen	8	0.04	New
Total	18,044		

=== General elections in the 1920s ===
1929 Danish Folketing election

Parties	Vote		
Parties	Votes	%	+ / -
Social Democrats	13,472	79.46	+6.05
Conservatives	2,059	12.14	-3.46
Social Liberals	781	4.61	-2.33
Venstre	260	1.53	+0.36
Justice Party of Denmark	221	1.30	+0.29
Communist Party of Denmark	162	0.96	-0.91
Total	16,955		

1926 Danish Folketing election

Parties	Vote		
Parties	Votes	%	+ / -
Social Democrats	12,067	73.41	-2.18
Conservatives	2,565	15.60	+3.41
Social Liberals	1,140	6.94	-0.08
Communist Party of Denmark	308	1.87	-0.19
Venstre	192	1.17	-0.39
Justice Party of Denmark	166	1.01	0.00
Total	16,438		

1924 Danish Folketing election

Parties	Vote		
Parties	Votes	%	+ / -
Social Democrats	12,025	75.59	+1.91
Conservatives	1,939	12.19	+1.13
Social Liberals	1,117	7.02	+1.22
Communist Party of Denmark	327	2.06	New
Venstre	248	1.56	-0.62
Justice Party of Denmark	160	1.01	New
Industry Party	92	0.58	-3.50
Total	15,908		

September 1920 Danish Folketing election

Parties	Vote		
Parties	Votes	%	+ / -
Social Democrats	10,218	73.68	+0.88
Conservatives	1,534	11.06	-0.64
Social Liberals	805	5.80	+0.79
Industry Party	566	4.08	-1.94
Venstre	303	2.18	-0.43
Free Social Democrats	231	1.67	New
Danish Left Socialist Party	211	1.52	New
Total	13,868		

July 1920 Danish Folketing election

Parties	Vote		
Parties	Votes	%	+ / -
Social Democrats	7,576	72.80	+5.52
Conservatives	1,218	11.70	-0.44
Industry Party	627	6.02	-1.25
Social Liberals	521	5.01	-0.67
Venstre	272	2.61	+0.08
Ernst Christiansen	144	1.38	-0.51
H. N. Krogsager	37	0.36	New
Karl Jensen	10	0.10	New
A. B. Storgaard-Nielsen	2	0.02	New
Total	10,407		

April 1920 Danish Folketing election

Parties	Vote	
Parties	Votes	%
Social Democrats	7,861	67.28
Conservatives	1,418	12.14
Industry Party	849	7.27
Social Liberals	664	5.68
Venstre	296	2.53
Free Social Democrats	249	2.13
Ernst Christiansen	221	1.89
Centrum	126	1.08
Total	11,684	

== European Parliament elections results ==
2024 European Parliament election in Denmark

Parties	Vote		
Parties	Votes	%	+ / -
Green Left	11,199	30.72	+0.91
Red–Green Alliance	10,212	28.01	+11.35
Social Liberals	4,110	11.27	-6.06
The Alternative	2,745	7.53	-2.81
Social Democrats	2,412	6.62	-3.81
Conservatives	1,377	3.78	+0.87
Venstre	1,347	3.69	-1.98
Liberal Alliance	1,228	3.37	+2.29
Moderates	991	2.72	New
Danish People's Party	624	1.71	-0.71
Denmark Democrats	214	0.59	New
Total	36,459		

2019 European Parliament election in Denmark

Parties	Vote		
Parties	Votes	%	+ / -
Green Left	12,047	29.81	-0.15
Social Liberals	7,003	17.33	+3.13
Red–Green Alliance	6,732	16.66	New
Social Democrats	4,213	10.43	-6.93
The Alternative	4,177	10.34	New
Venstre	2,291	5.67	+0.12
People's Movement against the EU	1,354	3.35	-14.83
Conservatives	1,175	2.91	-0.74
Danish People's Party	979	2.42	-6.11
Liberal Alliance	437	1.08	-1.49
Total	40,408		

2014 European Parliament election in Denmark

Parties	Vote		
Parties	Votes	%	+ / -
Green Left	9,346	29.96	-3.21
People's Movement against the EU	5,670	18.18	+3.41
Social Democrats	5,416	17.36	-2.39
Social Liberals	4,431	14.20	+4.84
Danish People's Party	2,661	8.53	+2.03
Venstre	1,731	5.55	-1.35
Conservatives	1,138	3.65	-1.84
Liberal Alliance	803	2.57	+1.89
Total	31,196		

2009 European Parliament election in Denmark

Parties	Vote		
Parties	Votes	%	+ / -
Green Left	9,334	33.17	+14.49
Social Democrats	5,559	19.75	-8.87
People's Movement against the EU	4,157	14.77	+4.84
Social Liberals	2,634	9.36	-7.65
Venstre	1,942	6.90	-0.27
Danish People's Party	1,828	6.50	+3.09
Conservatives	1,545	5.49	-0.43
June Movement	950	3.38	-5.32
Liberal Alliance	192	0.68	New
Total	28,141		

2004 European Parliament election in Denmark

Parties	Vote		
Parties	Votes	%	+ / -
Social Democrats	2,712	28.62	+15.61
Green Left	1,770	18.68	+4.96
Social Liberals	1,612	17.01	-0.01
People's Movement against the EU	941	9.93	-2.91
June Movement	824	8.70	-9.99
Venstre	679	7.17	-4.19
Conservatives	561	5.92	+0.66
Danish People's Party	323	3.41	-0.65
Christian Democrats	54	0.57	-0.39
Total	9,476		

1999 European Parliament election in Denmark

Parties	Vote		
Parties	Votes	%	+ / -
June Movement	1,796	18.69	-5.25
Social Liberals	1,636	17.02	+7.56
Green Left	1,319	13.72	+0.45
Social Democrats	1,250	13.01	+1.06
People's Movement against the EU	1,234	12.84	-6.59
Venstre	1,092	11.36	+3.35
Conservatives	506	5.26	-5.30
Danish People's Party	390	4.06	New
Centre Democrats	296	3.08	+2.20
Christian Democrats	92	0.96	+0.23
Progress Party	21	0.22	-1.55
Total	9,611		

1994 European Parliament election in Denmark

Parties	Vote		
Parties	Votes	%	+ / -
June Movement	2,319	23.94	New
People's Movement against the EU	1,882	19.43	-18.55
Green Left	1,285	13.27	-4.07
Social Democrats	1,157	11.95	-9.31
Conservatives	1,023	10.56	+3.53
Social Liberals	916	9.46	+6.37
Venstre	776	8.01	+2.24
Progress Party	171	1.77	-0.72
Centre Democrats	85	0.88	-3.04
Christian Democrats	71	0.73	-0.40
Total	9,685		

1989 European Parliament election in Denmark

Parties	Vote		
Parties	Votes	%	+ / -
People's Movement against the EU	3,422	37.98	+0.82
Social Democrats	1,915	21.26	-0.82
Green Left	1,562	17.34	0.00
Conservatives	633	7.03	-1.79
Venstre	520	5.77	+3.64
Centre Democrats	353	3.92	+1.39
Social Liberals	278	3.09	+0.96
Progress Party	224	2.49	+0.25
Christian Democrats	102	1.13	+0.10
Total	9,009		

1984 European Parliament election in Denmark

Parties	Vote	
Parties	Votes	%
People's Movement against the EU	3,600	37.16
Social Democrats	2,139	22.08
Green Left	1,680	17.34
Conservatives	854	8.82
Left Socialists	440	4.54
Centre Democrats	245	2.53
Progress Party	217	2.24
Social Liberals	206	2.13
Venstre	206	2.13
Christian Democrats	100	1.03
Total	9,687	

== Referendums ==
2022 Danish European Union opt-out referendum

Option	Votes	%
✓ YES	22,004	65.34
X NO	11,672	34.66

2015 Danish European Union opt-out referendum

Option	Votes	%
X NO	18,527	50.23
✓ YES	18,355	49.77

2014 Danish Unified Patent Court membership referendum

Option	Votes	%
✓ YES	15,760	52.22
X NO	14,420	47.78

2009 Danish Act of Succession referendum

Option	Votes	%
✓ YES	17,872	84.33
X NO	3,321	15.67

2000 Danish euro referendum

Option	Votes	%
X NO	8,319	53.43
✓ YES	7,252	46.57

1998 Danish Amsterdam Treaty referendum

Option	Votes	%
X NO	6,935	51.61
✓ YES	6,502	48.39

1993 Danish Maastricht Treaty referendum

Option	Votes	%
X NO	9,417	60.61
✓ YES	6,120	39.39

1992 Danish Maastricht Treaty referendum

Option	Votes	%
X NO	10,343	67.39
✓ YES	5,005	32.61

1986 Danish Single European Act referendum

Option	Votes	%
X NO	9,515	72.85
✓ YES	3,546	27.15

1972 Danish European Communities membership referendum

Option	Votes	%
X NO	11,978	60.47
✓ YES	7,829	39.53

1953 Danish constitutional and electoral age referendum

Option	Votes	%
✓ YES	10,506	77.18
X NO	3,107	22.82
21 years	8,310	59.67
23 years	5,616	40.33

1939 Danish constitutional referendum

Option	Votes	%
✓ YES	16,386	97.67
X NO	391	2.33
