= Vesterbro (nomination district) =

Nomination district in Copenhagen Constituency, Denmark

- Vesterbro
- Nomination district constituency for the Folketing
- Location of Vesterbro within Copenhagen

- Location of Copenhagen within Denmark
- Municipalities: Copenhagen
- Constituency: Copenhagen
- Electorate: 51,763 (2022)

Current constituency
- Created: 1915

Vesterbro nominating district is one of the 92 nominating districts exists for Danish elections following the 2007 municipal reform. It is one of the 9 nominating districts in Copenhagen Municipality. It was created in 1915, though its boundaries have been changed since then.

In general elections, the district is a very strong area for parties commonly associated with the red bloc, and it became the district where they received their fourth highest vote share in the 2022 election.

== General elections results ==
=== General elections in the 2020s ===
2022 Danish general election

| Parties | Vote | | |
| Parties | Votes | % | + / - |
|---|---|---|---|
| Red–Green Alliance | 7,288 | 16.71 | -4.48 |
| Social Democrats | 6,432 | 14.75 | +0.62 |
| The Alternative | 5,343 | 12.25 | +3.66 |
| Green Left | 5,167 | 11.85 | -0.32 |
| Moderates | 4,082 | 9.36 | New |
| Liberal Alliance | 4,072 | 9.34 | +6.46 |
| Social Liberals | 3,729 | 8.55 | -9.22 |
| Venstre | 3,346 | 7.67 | -5.18 |
| Conservatives | 1,679 | 3.85 | +0.13 |
| Independent Greens | 742 | 1.70 | New |
| New Right | 628 | 1.44 | +0.23 |
| Denmark Democrats | 536 | 1.23 | New |
| Danish People's Party | 433 | 0.99 | -1.69 |
| Christian Democrats | 58 | 0.13 | -0.33 |
| Flemming Blicher | 53 | 0.12 | New |
| Tom Gillesberg | 17 | 0.04 | +0.01 |
| Total | 43,605 | | |

=== General elections in the 2010s ===
2019 Danish general election

| Parties | Vote | | |
| Parties | Votes | % | + / - |
|---|---|---|---|
| Red–Green Alliance | 8,520 | 21.19 | +0.43 |
| Social Liberals | 7,145 | 17.77 | +7.03 |
| Social Democrats | 5,683 | 14.13 | -5.58 |
| Venstre | 5,169 | 12.85 | +5.50 |
| Green Left | 4,895 | 12.17 | +4.92 |
| The Alternative | 3,453 | 8.59 | -7.21 |
| Conservatives | 1,497 | 3.72 | +1.78 |
| Liberal Alliance | 1,160 | 2.88 | -5.23 |
| Danish People's Party | 1,076 | 2.68 | -5.18 |
| New Right | 487 | 1.21 | New |
| Stram Kurs | 478 | 1.19 | New |
| Klaus Riskær Pedersen Party | 419 | 1.04 | New |
| Christian Democrats | 184 | 0.46 | +0.23 |
| Pierre Tavares | 23 | 0.06 | New |
| Tom Gillesberg | 13 | 0.03 | +0.02 |
| John Jørgensen | 9 | 0.02 | New |
| Tommy Schou Christesen | 3 | 0.01 | New |
| John Erik Wagner | 1 | 0.00 | -0.01 |
| Total | 40,215 | | |

2015 Danish general election

| Parties | Vote | | |
| Parties | Votes | % | + / - |
|---|---|---|---|
| Red–Green Alliance | 7,413 | 20.76 | -2.04 |
| Social Democrats | 7,038 | 19.71 | +2.33 |
| The Alternative | 5,643 | 15.80 | New |
| Social Liberals | 3,834 | 10.74 | -8.55 |
| Liberal Alliance | 2,897 | 8.11 | +2.52 |
| Danish People's Party | 2,805 | 7.86 | +1.78 |
| Venstre | 2,626 | 7.35 | -3.45 |
| Green Left | 2,590 | 7.25 | -6.76 |
| Conservatives | 693 | 1.94 | -1.75 |
| Christian Democrats | 83 | 0.23 | -0.02 |
| Kashif Ahmad | 77 | 0.22 | New |
| Tom Gillesberg | 4 | 0.01 | -0.01 |
| John Erik Wagner | 3 | 0.01 | 0.00 |
| Jan Elkjær | 2 | 0.01 | New |
| Total | 35,708 | | |

2011 Danish general election

| Parties | Vote | | |
| Parties | Votes | % | + / - |
|---|---|---|---|
| Red–Green Alliance | 7,940 | 22.80 | +12.31 |
| Social Liberals | 6,719 | 19.29 | +8.97 |
| Social Democrats | 6,054 | 17.38 | -6.10 |
| Green Left | 4,880 | 14.01 | -12.95 |
| Venstre | 3,763 | 10.80 | +1.36 |
| Danish People's Party | 2,116 | 6.08 | -2.02 |
| Liberal Alliance | 1,947 | 5.59 | +1.54 |
| Conservatives | 1,286 | 3.69 | -2.97 |
| Christian Democrats | 88 | 0.25 | -0.24 |
| Klaus Trier Tuxen | 16 | 0.05 | New |
| Tom Gillesberg | 8 | 0.02 | +0.02 |
| Mads Vestergaard | 4 | 0.01 | New |
| Per Zimmermann | 4 | 0.01 | New |
| John Erik Wagner | 3 | 0.01 | +0.01 |
| Morten Versner | 1 | 0.00 | New |
| Total | 34,829 | | |

=== General elections in the 2000s ===
2007 Danish general election

| Parties | Vote | | |
| Parties | Votes | % | + / - |
|---|---|---|---|
| Green Left | 8,438 | 26.96 | +13.96 |
| Social Democrats | 7,350 | 23.48 | +3.01 |
| Red–Green Alliance | 3,283 | 10.49 | -2.87 |
| Social Liberals | 3,232 | 10.32 | -16.29 |
| Venstre | 2,954 | 9.44 | -1.98 |
| Danish People's Party | 2,537 | 8.10 | +2.03 |
| Conservatives | 2,085 | 6.66 | +0.16 |
| New Alliance | 1,268 | 4.05 | New |
| Christian Democrats | 153 | 0.49 | -0.34 |
| Amir Becirovic | 1 | 0.00 | New |
| Tom Gillesberg | 1 | 0.00 | New |
| Vibeke Baden Laursen | 1 | 0.00 | New |
| John Erik Wagner | 1 | 0.00 | New |
| Nicolai Krogh Mittet | 0 | 0.00 | New |
| Total | 31,304 | | |

2005 Danish general election

| Parties | Vote | | |
| Parties | Votes | % | + / - |
|---|---|---|---|
| Social Liberals | 4,497 | 26.61 | +10.95 |
| Social Democrats | 3,459 | 20.47 | -5.54 |
| Red–Green Alliance | 2,258 | 13.36 | +1.85 |
| Green Left | 2,197 | 13.00 | -2.84 |
| Venstre | 1,930 | 11.42 | -3.20 |
| Conservatives | 1,099 | 6.50 | +0.88 |
| Danish People's Party | 1,025 | 6.07 | -0.64 |
| Centre Democrats | 194 | 1.15 | -1.51 |
| Christian Democrats | 141 | 0.83 | -0.28 |
| Minority Party | 99 | 0.59 | New |
| Total | 16,899 | | |

2001 Danish general election

| Parties | Vote | | |
| Parties | Votes | % | + / - |
|---|---|---|---|
| Social Democrats | 4,521 | 26.01 | -4.78 |
| Green Left | 2,753 | 15.84 | -2.08 |
| Social Liberals | 2,722 | 15.66 | +5.38 |
| Venstre | 2,541 | 14.62 | +4.64 |
| Red–Green Alliance | 2,000 | 11.51 | -2.68 |
| Danish People's Party | 1,166 | 6.71 | +1.20 |
| Conservatives | 977 | 5.62 | +0.10 |
| Centre Democrats | 462 | 2.66 | -0.77 |
| Christian People's Party | 193 | 1.11 | +0.10 |
| Progress Party | 48 | 0.28 | -0.69 |
| Total | 17,383 | | |

=== General elections in the 1990s ===
1998 Danish general election

| Parties | Vote | | |
| Parties | Votes | % | + / - |
|---|---|---|---|
| Social Democrats | 5,194 | 30.79 | +0.37 |
| Green Left | 3,023 | 17.92 | -0.56 |
| Red–Green Alliance | 2,394 | 14.19 | -1.38 |
| Social Liberals | 1,735 | 10.28 | +3.44 |
| Venstre | 1,683 | 9.98 | -0.44 |
| Conservatives | 932 | 5.52 | -3.89 |
| Danish People's Party | 929 | 5.51 | New |
| Centre Democrats | 578 | 3.43 | +1.13 |
| Christian People's Party | 171 | 1.01 | -0.08 |
| Progress Party | 164 | 0.97 | -4.30 |
| Democratic Renewal | 68 | 0.40 | New |
| Total | 16,871 | | |

1994 Danish general election

| Parties | Vote | | |
| Parties | Votes | % | + / - |
|---|---|---|---|
| Social Democrats | 4,726 | 30.42 | -9.64 |
| Green Left | 2,870 | 18.48 | -2.77 |
| Red–Green Alliance | 2,419 | 15.57 | +7.32 |
| Venstre | 1,619 | 10.42 | +4.72 |
| Conservatives | 1,461 | 9.41 | +0.82 |
| Social Liberals | 1,063 | 6.84 | +3.53 |
| Progress Party | 819 | 5.27 | +2.58 |
| Centre Democrats | 357 | 2.30 | +0.06 |
| Christian People's Party | 170 | 1.09 | +0.17 |
| Ebba Bigler | 30 | 0.19 | New |
| Total | 15,534 | | |

1990 Danish general election

| Parties | Vote | | |
| Parties | Votes | % | + / - |
|---|---|---|---|
| Social Democrats | 5,985 | 40.06 | +10.90 |
| Green Left | 3,175 | 21.25 | -11.05 |
| Conservatives | 1,283 | 8.59 | -1.25 |
| Red–Green Alliance | 1,233 | 8.25 | New |
| Venstre | 852 | 5.70 | +3.21 |
| Common Course | 623 | 4.17 | -0.10 |
| Social Liberals | 494 | 3.31 | -1.29 |
| Progress Party | 402 | 2.69 | -2.53 |
| Centre Democrats | 335 | 2.24 | +0.43 |
| The Greens | 321 | 2.15 | -0.72 |
| Christian People's Party | 138 | 0.92 | +0.17 |
| Justice Party of Denmark | 77 | 0.52 | New |
| Humanist Party | 22 | 0.15 | New |
| Total | 14,940 | | |

=== General elections in the 1980s ===
1988 Danish general election

| Parties | Vote | | |
| Parties | Votes | % | + / - |
|---|---|---|---|
| Green Left | 5,103 | 32.30 | -0.25 |
| Social Democrats | 4,608 | 29.16 | +1.55 |
| Conservatives | 1,555 | 9.84 | +0.11 |
| Progress Party | 825 | 5.22 | +2.01 |
| Social Liberals | 727 | 4.60 | +0.24 |
| Common Course | 675 | 4.27 | -0.45 |
| Left Socialists | 601 | 3.80 | -4.00 |
| Communist Party of Denmark | 455 | 2.88 | +0.34 |
| The Greens | 453 | 2.87 | +0.35 |
| Venstre | 393 | 2.49 | +0.88 |
| Centre Democrats | 286 | 1.81 | +0.27 |
| Christian People's Party | 119 | 0.75 | 0.00 |
| Total | 15,800 | | |

1987 Danish general election

| Parties | Vote | | |
| Parties | Votes | % | + / - |
|---|---|---|---|
| Green Left | 5,257 | 32.55 | +9.74 |
| Social Democrats | 4,460 | 27.61 | -12.79 |
| Conservatives | 1,572 | 9.73 | -1.31 |
| Left Socialists | 1,260 | 7.80 | -4.29 |
| Common Course | 763 | 4.72 | New |
| Social Liberals | 704 | 4.36 | +1.55 |
| Progress Party | 518 | 3.21 | +0.77 |
| Communist Party of Denmark | 410 | 2.54 | -0.06 |
| The Greens | 407 | 2.52 | New |
| Venstre | 260 | 1.61 | -0.15 |
| Centre Democrats | 248 | 1.54 | +0.06 |
| Christian People's Party | 121 | 0.75 | +0.10 |
| Justice Party of Denmark | 76 | 0.47 | -1.19 |
| Humanist Party | 59 | 0.37 | New |
| Socialist Workers Party | 26 | 0.16 | 0.00 |
| Marxist–Leninists Party | 12 | 0.07 | -0.04 |
| Total | 16,153 | | |

1984 Danish general election

| Parties | Vote | | |
| Parties | Votes | % | + / - |
|---|---|---|---|
| Social Democrats | 7,049 | 40.40 | +0.91 |
| Green Left | 3,980 | 22.81 | +0.59 |
| Left Socialists | 2,109 | 12.09 | -0.31 |
| Conservatives | 1,926 | 11.04 | +4.64 |
| Social Liberals | 491 | 2.81 | +0.03 |
| Communist Party of Denmark | 453 | 2.60 | -1.32 |
| Progress Party | 426 | 2.44 | -3.71 |
| Venstre | 307 | 1.76 | +0.48 |
| Justice Party of Denmark | 290 | 1.66 | -0.06 |
| Centre Democrats | 258 | 1.48 | -0.90 |
| Christian People's Party | 113 | 0.65 | +0.09 |
| Socialist Workers Party | 28 | 0.16 | -0.03 |
| Marxist–Leninists Party | 20 | 0.11 | New |
| Total | 17,450 | | |

1981 Danish general election

| Parties | Vote | | |
| Parties | Votes | % | + / - |
|---|---|---|---|
| Social Democrats | 6,521 | 39.49 | -10.22 |
| Green Left | 3,669 | 22.22 | +12.15 |
| Left Socialists | 2,047 | 12.40 | +0.20 |
| Conservatives | 1,057 | 6.40 | +1.51 |
| Progress Party | 1,016 | 6.15 | +0.20 |
| Communist Party of Denmark | 647 | 3.92 | -2.59 |
| Social Liberals | 459 | 2.78 | -0.08 |
| Centre Democrats | 393 | 2.38 | +1.40 |
| Justice Party of Denmark | 284 | 1.72 | -1.50 |
| Venstre | 211 | 1.28 | -0.42 |
| Christian People's Party | 92 | 0.56 | +0.02 |
| Communist Workers Party | 87 | 0.53 | -0.78 |
| Socialist Workers Party | 31 | 0.19 | New |
| Total | 16,514 | | |

=== General elections in the 1970s ===
1979 Danish general election

| Parties | Vote | | |
| Parties | Votes | % | + / - |
|---|---|---|---|
| Social Democrats | 8,808 | 49.71 | -3.17 |
| Left Socialists | 2,162 | 12.20 | +10.44 |
| Green Left | 1,785 | 10.07 | +2.37 |
| Communist Party of Denmark | 1,153 | 6.51 | -6.37 |
| Progress Party | 1,054 | 5.95 | -2.77 |
| Conservatives | 866 | 4.89 | +1.22 |
| Justice Party of Denmark | 570 | 3.22 | -0.77 |
| Social Liberals | 506 | 2.86 | +1.30 |
| Venstre | 301 | 1.70 | +0.06 |
| Communist Workers Party | 233 | 1.31 | New |
| Centre Democrats | 173 | 0.98 | -0.96 |
| Christian People's Party | 96 | 0.54 | -0.33 |
| Thorkild Weiss Madsen | 12 | 0.07 | New |
| Total | 17,719 | | |

1977 Danish general election

| Parties | Vote | | |
| Parties | Votes | % | + / - |
|---|---|---|---|
| Social Democrats | 9,803 | 52.88 | +10.14 |
| Communist Party of Denmark | 2,388 | 12.88 | -2.28 |
| Progress Party | 1,616 | 8.72 | -0.50 |
| Green Left | 1,427 | 7.70 | -3.39 |
| Justice Party of Denmark | 740 | 3.99 | +2.43 |
| Conservatives | 680 | 3.67 | +0.77 |
| Pensioners' Party | 434 | 2.34 | New |
| Centre Democrats | 359 | 1.94 | +1.10 |
| Left Socialists | 326 | 1.76 | -2.63 |
| Venstre | 304 | 1.64 | -4.96 |
| Social Liberals | 289 | 1.56 | -1.93 |
| Christian People's Party | 161 | 0.87 | -1.13 |
| Niels Kjær-Larsen | 12 | 0.06 | New |
| Total | 18,539 | | |

1975 Danish general election

| Parties | Vote | | |
| Parties | Votes | % | + / - |
|---|---|---|---|
| Social Democrats | 9,012 | 42.74 | +4.19 |
| Communist Party of Denmark | 3,197 | 15.16 | +2.10 |
| Green Left | 2,338 | 11.09 | -3.24 |
| Progress Party | 1,944 | 9.22 | -0.83 |
| Venstre | 1,391 | 6.60 | +4.81 |
| Left Socialists | 926 | 4.39 | +1.70 |
| Social Liberals | 736 | 3.49 | -1.56 |
| Conservatives | 611 | 2.90 | -2.25 |
| Christian People's Party | 421 | 2.00 | +0.61 |
| Justice Party of Denmark | 328 | 1.56 | -1.07 |
| Centre Democrats | 177 | 0.84 | -4.44 |
| Otto Holtermann | 7 | 0.03 | New |
| Total | 21,088 | | |

1973 Danish general election

| Parties | Vote | | |
| Parties | Votes | % | + / - |
|---|---|---|---|
| Social Democrats | 8,716 | 38.55 | -9.29 |
| Green Left | 3,240 | 14.33 | -7.96 |
| Communist Party of Denmark | 2,952 | 13.06 | +8.57 |
| Progress Party | 2,273 | 10.05 | New |
| Centre Democrats | 1,194 | 5.28 | New |
| Conservatives | 1,164 | 5.15 | -3.86 |
| Social Liberals | 1,141 | 5.05 | -2.86 |
| Left Socialists | 607 | 2.69 | -1.22 |
| Justice Party of Denmark | 594 | 2.63 | +0.94 |
| Venstre | 404 | 1.79 | -0.28 |
| Christian People's Party | 314 | 1.39 | +0.59 |
| Anne Vedelstierne | 6 | 0.03 | New |
| Bent Jespersen | 2 | 0.01 | New |
| Total | 22,607 | | |

1971 Danish general election

| Parties | Vote | | |
| Parties | Votes | % | + / - |
|---|---|---|---|
| Social Democrats | 11,316 | 47.84 | +6.95 |
| Green Left | 5,273 | 22.29 | +7.26 |
| Conservatives | 2,131 | 9.01 | -6.81 |
| Social Liberals | 1,870 | 7.91 | -4.96 |
| Communist Party of Denmark | 1,061 | 4.49 | +0.69 |
| Left Socialists | 924 | 3.91 | -2.44 |
| Venstre | 490 | 2.07 | -1.15 |
| Justice Party of Denmark | 399 | 1.69 | +1.22 |
| Christian People's Party | 189 | 0.80 | New |
| Total | 23,653 | | |

=== General elections in the 1960s ===
1968 Danish general election

| Parties | Vote | | |
| Parties | Votes | % | + / - |
|---|---|---|---|
| Social Democrats | 4,773 | 40.89 | -2.26 |
| Conservatives | 1,846 | 15.82 | +3.50 |
| Green Left | 1,754 | 15.03 | -16.83 |
| Social Liberals | 1,502 | 12.87 | +9.17 |
| Left Socialists | 741 | 6.35 | New |
| Communist Party of Denmark | 444 | 3.80 | +1.75 |
| Venstre | 376 | 3.22 | -0.37 |
| Liberal Centre | 143 | 1.23 | -0.99 |
| Justice Party of Denmark | 55 | 0.47 | +0.05 |
| Independent Party | 36 | 0.31 | -0.37 |
| Alf Bruhn | 2 | 0.02 | New |
| Total | 11,672 | | |

1966 Danish general election

| Parties | Vote | | |
| Parties | Votes | % | + / - |
|---|---|---|---|
| Social Democrats | 5,267 | 43.15 | -10.33 |
| Green Left | 3,889 | 31.86 | +14.71 |
| Conservatives | 1,504 | 12.32 | -2.21 |
| Social Liberals | 452 | 3.70 | +1.45 |
| Venstre | 438 | 3.59 | -2.55 |
| Liberal Centre | 271 | 2.22 | New |
| Communist Party of Denmark | 250 | 2.05 | -1.56 |
| Independent Party | 83 | 0.68 | -0.74 |
| Justice Party of Denmark | 51 | 0.42 | -0.35 |
| Total | 12,205 | | |

1964 Danish general election

| Parties | Vote | | |
| Parties | Votes | % | + / - |
|---|---|---|---|
| Social Democrats | 6,440 | 53.48 | -1.07 |
| Green Left | 2,065 | 17.15 | +0.15 |
| Conservatives | 1,750 | 14.53 | +0.51 |
| Venstre | 739 | 6.14 | +1.01 |
| Communist Party of Denmark | 435 | 3.61 | +0.35 |
| Social Liberals | 271 | 2.25 | -0.25 |
| Independent Party | 171 | 1.42 | -0.50 |
| Justice Party of Denmark | 93 | 0.77 | -0.85 |
| Peace Politics People's Party | 48 | 0.40 | New |
| Danish Unity | 28 | 0.23 | New |
| Total | 12,042 | | |

1960 Danish general election

| Parties | Vote | | |
| Parties | Votes | % | + / - |
|---|---|---|---|
| Social Democrats | 6,718 | 54.55 | +0.27 |
| Green Left | 2,093 | 17.00 | New |
| Conservatives | 1,726 | 14.02 | -1.64 |
| Venstre | 632 | 5.13 | -2.04 |
| Communist Party of Denmark | 402 | 3.26 | -5.68 |
| Social Liberals | 308 | 2.50 | -3.39 |
| Independent Party | 237 | 1.92 | +0.56 |
| Justice Party of Denmark | 199 | 1.62 | -5.07 |
| Total | 12,315 | | |

=== General elections in the 1950s ===
1957 Danish general election

| Parties | Vote | | |
| Parties | Votes | % | + / - |
|---|---|---|---|
| Social Democrats | 6,678 | 54.28 | -3.29 |
| Conservatives | 1,927 | 15.66 | -1.14 |
| Communist Party of Denmark | 1,100 | 8.94 | -3.17 |
| Venstre | 882 | 7.17 | +2.72 |
| Justice Party of Denmark | 823 | 6.69 | +3.79 |
| Social Liberals | 725 | 5.89 | +1.43 |
| Independent Party | 167 | 1.36 | -0.35 |
| Total | 12,302 | | |

September 1953 Danish Folketing election

| Parties | Vote | | |
| Parties | Votes | % | + / - |
|---|---|---|---|
| Social Democrats | 7,205 | 57.57 | +1.78 |
| Conservatives | 2,102 | 16.80 | +1.09 |
| Communist Party of Denmark | 1,516 | 12.11 | -1.10 |
| Social Liberals | 558 | 4.46 | -1.08 |
| Venstre | 557 | 4.45 | +0.75 |
| Justice Party of Denmark | 363 | 2.90 | -2.47 |
| Independent Party | 214 | 1.71 | New |
| Total | 12,515 | | |

April 1953 Danish Folketing election

| Parties | Vote | | |
| Parties | Votes | % | + / - |
|---|---|---|---|
| Social Democrats | 6,904 | 55.79 | +2.39 |
| Conservatives | 1,944 | 15.71 | -0.76 |
| Communist Party of Denmark | 1,635 | 13.21 | +0.84 |
| Social Liberals | 686 | 5.54 | +0.19 |
| Justice Party of Denmark | 665 | 5.37 | -4.80 |
| Venstre | 458 | 3.70 | +1.47 |
| Danish Unity | 82 | 0.66 | New |
| Total | 12,374 | | |

1950 Danish Folketing election

| Parties | Vote | | |
| Parties | Votes | % | + / - |
|---|---|---|---|
| Social Democrats | 6,715 | 53.40 | -0.91 |
| Conservatives | 2,071 | 16.47 | +4.48 |
| Communist Party of Denmark | 1,556 | 12.37 | -4.81 |
| Justice Party of Denmark | 1,279 | 10.17 | +6.20 |
| Social Liberals | 673 | 5.35 | +1.25 |
| Venstre | 280 | 2.23 | -5.34 |
| Total | 12,574 | | |

=== General elections in the 1940s ===
1947 Danish Folketing election

| Parties | Vote | | |
| Parties | Votes | % | + / - |
|---|---|---|---|
| Social Democrats | 7,567 | 54.31 | +14.95 |
| Communist Party of Denmark | 2,394 | 17.18 | -11.79 |
| Conservatives | 1,671 | 11.99 | -7.70 |
| Capital Venstre | 1,054 | 7.57 | +3.47 |
| Social Liberals | 571 | 4.10 | -0.42 |
| Justice Party of Denmark | 553 | 3.97 | +3.00 |
| Danish Unity | 122 | 0.88 | -1.52 |
| Total | 13,932 | | |

1945 Danish Folketing election

| Parties | Vote | | |
| Parties | Votes | % | + / - |
|---|---|---|---|
| Social Democrats | 5,413 | 39.36 | -24.95 |
| Communist Party of Denmark | 3,984 | 28.97 | New |
| Conservatives | 2,708 | 19.69 | -1.71 |
| Social Liberals | 621 | 4.52 | -1.84 |
| Venstre | 564 | 4.10 | +3.01 |
| Danish Unity | 330 | 2.40 | +0.18 |
| Justice Party of Denmark | 133 | 0.97 | +0.17 |
| Total | 13,753 | | |

1943 Danish Folketing election

| Parties | Vote | | |
| Parties | Votes | % | + / - |
|---|---|---|---|
| Social Democrats | 8,996 | 64.31 | -1.15 |
| Conservatives | 2,994 | 21.40 | +5.28 |
| Social Liberals | 890 | 6.36 | -0.13 |
| National Socialist Workers' Party of Denmark | 534 | 3.82 | +1.66 |
| Danish Unity | 310 | 2.22 | +1.99 |
| Venstre | 152 | 1.09 | -0.05 |
| Justice Party of Denmark | 112 | 0.80 | +0.06 |
| Total | 13,988 | | |

=== General elections in the 1930s ===
1939 Danish Folketing election

| Parties | Vote | | |
| Parties | Votes | % | + / - |
|---|---|---|---|
| Social Democrats | 7,832 | 65.46 | -3.86 |
| Conservatives | 1,929 | 16.12 | -0.22 |
| Social Liberals | 776 | 6.49 | -0.37 |
| Communist Party of Denmark | 762 | 6.37 | +1.85 |
| National Socialist Workers' Party of Denmark | 259 | 2.16 | +1.34 |
| National Cooperation | 156 | 1.30 | New |
| Venstre | 136 | 1.14 | +0.55 |
| Justice Party of Denmark | 88 | 0.74 | -0.81 |
| Danish Unity | 27 | 0.23 | New |
| Total | 11,965 | | |

1935 Danish Folketing election

| Parties | Vote | | |
| Parties | Votes | % | + / - |
|---|---|---|---|
| Social Democrats | 9,327 | 69.32 | +24.26 |
| Conservatives | 2,198 | 16.34 | +2.60 |
| Social Liberals | 923 | 6.86 | -29.66 |
| Communist Party of Denmark | 608 | 4.52 | +2.07 |
| Justice Party of Denmark | 209 | 1.55 | +0.40 |
| National Socialist Workers' Party of Denmark | 111 | 0.82 | New |
| Venstre | 79 | 0.59 | -0.50 |
| Total | 13,455 | | |

1932 Danish Folketing election

| Parties | Vote | | |
| Parties | Votes | % | + / - |
|---|---|---|---|
| Social Democrats | 8,947 | 45.06 | -22.98 |
| Social Liberals | 7,251 | 36.52 | +30.89 |
| Conservatives | 2,728 | 13.74 | -7.48 |
| Communist Party of Denmark | 487 | 2.45 | +1.81 |
| Justice Party of Denmark | 228 | 1.15 | -0.68 |
| Venstre | 216 | 1.09 | -1.56 |
| Curt C. Hansen | 0 | 0.00 | New |
| Total | 19,857 | | |

=== General elections in the 1920s ===
1929 Danish Folketing election

| Parties | Vote | | |
| Parties | Votes | % | + / - |
|---|---|---|---|
| Social Democrats | 8,563 | 68.04 | +7.70 |
| Conservatives | 2,670 | 21.22 | -5.81 |
| Social Liberals | 709 | 5.63 | -2.40 |
| Venstre | 333 | 2.65 | +0.36 |
| Justice Party of Denmark | 230 | 1.83 | +0.86 |
| Communist Party of Denmark | 80 | 0.64 | -0.69 |
| Total | 12,585 | | |

1926 Danish Folketing election

| Parties | Vote | | |
| Parties | Votes | % | + / - |
|---|---|---|---|
| Social Democrats | 7,551 | 60.34 | -1.08 |
| Conservatives | 3,383 | 27.03 | +3.02 |
| Social Liberals | 1,005 | 8.03 | -0.83 |
| Venstre | 287 | 2.29 | -0.01 |
| Communist Party of Denmark | 166 | 1.33 | -0.64 |
| Justice Party of Denmark | 122 | 0.97 | +0.35 |
| Total | 12,514 | | |

1924 Danish Folketing election

| Parties | Vote | | |
| Parties | Votes | % | + / - |
|---|---|---|---|
| Social Democrats | 8,059 | 61.42 | +2.50 |
| Conservatives | 3,151 | 24.01 | +1.56 |
| Social Liberals | 1,162 | 8.86 | +1.41 |
| Venstre | 302 | 2.30 | -1.11 |
| Communist Party of Denmark | 258 | 1.97 | New |
| Industry Party | 107 | 0.82 | -4.20 |
| Justice Party of Denmark | 82 | 0.62 | New |
| Total | 13,121 | | |

September 1920 Danish Folketing election

| Parties | Vote | | |
| Parties | Votes | % | + / - |
|---|---|---|---|
| Social Democrats | 7,290 | 58.92 | +3.40 |
| Conservatives | 2,778 | 22.45 | -2.73 |
| Social Liberals | 922 | 7.45 | +0.85 |
| Industry Party | 621 | 5.02 | -1.97 |
| Venstre | 422 | 3.41 | -1.38 |
| Free Social Democrats | 213 | 1.72 | New |
| Danish Left Socialist Party | 127 | 1.03 | New |
| Total | 12,373 | | |

July 1920 Danish Folketing election

| Parties | Vote | | |
| Parties | Votes | % | + / - |
|---|---|---|---|
| Social Democrats | 5,104 | 55.52 | +3.80 |
| Conservatives | 2,315 | 25.18 | +0.67 |
| Industry Party | 643 | 6.99 | -1.19 |
| Social Liberals | 607 | 6.60 | -0.22 |
| Venstre | 440 | 4.79 | +0.55 |
| Henrik Jarlbæk | 72 | 0.78 | -0.41 |
| Jensine M. Nielsen-Barbro | 10 | 0.11 | New |
| J. L. Knudsen | 2 | 0.02 | New |
| Th. S. Damsgaard Schmidt | 0 | 0.00 | New |
| Total | 9,193 | | |

April 1920 Danish Folketing election

| Parties | Vote | |
| Parties | Votes | % |
|---|---|---|
| Social Democrats | 5,536 | 51.72 |
| Conservatives | 2,624 | 24.51 |
| Industry Party | 876 | 8.18 |
| Social Liberals | 730 | 6.82 |
| Venstre | 454 | 4.24 |
| Centrum | 198 | 1.85 |
| Free Social Democrats | 159 | 1.49 |
| Henrik Jarlbæk | 127 | 1.19 |
| Total | 10,704 | |

== European Parliament elections results ==
2024 European Parliament election in Denmark

| Parties | Vote | | |
| Parties | Votes | % | + / - |
|---|---|---|---|
| Green Left | 9,802 | 28.47 | +2.92 |
| Red–Green Alliance | 6,825 | 19.82 | +6.91 |
| Social Liberals | 4,375 | 12.71 | -4.55 |
| Social Democrats | 2,812 | 8.17 | -4.11 |
| Liberal Alliance | 2,121 | 6.16 | +4.04 |
| The Alternative | 2,047 | 5.95 | -3.33 |
| Conservatives | 1,981 | 5.75 | +1.6 |
| Venstre | 1,922 | 5.58 | -3.78 |
| Moderates | 1,463 | 4.25 | New |
| Danish People's Party | 805 | 2.34 | -1.21 |
| Denmark Democrats | 275 | 0.80 | New |
| Total | 34,428 | | |

2019 European Parliament election in Denmark

| Parties | Vote | | |
| Parties | Votes | % | + / - |
|---|---|---|---|
| Green Left | 8,552 | 25.55 | -0.45 |
| Social Liberals | 5,775 | 17.26 | +2.78 |
| Red–Green Alliance | 4,321 | 12.91 | New |
| Social Democrats | 4,108 | 12.28 | -6.32 |
| Venstre | 3,131 | 9.36 | +2.81 |
| The Alternative | 3,107 | 9.28 | New |
| Conservatives | 1,390 | 4.15 | -0.01 |
| Danish People's Party | 1,188 | 3.55 | -8.07 |
| People's Movement against the EU | 1,186 | 3.54 | -12.03 |
| Liberal Alliance | 708 | 2.12 | -0.89 |
| Total | 33,466 | | |

2014 European Parliament election in Denmark

| Parties | Vote | | |
| Parties | Votes | % | + / - |
|---|---|---|---|
| Green Left | 6,099 | 26.00 | -4.10 |
| Social Democrats | 4,364 | 18.60 | -1.20 |
| People's Movement against the EU | 3,652 | 15.57 | +1.56 |
| Social Liberals | 3,398 | 14.48 | +4.32 |
| Danish People's Party | 2,727 | 11.62 | +3.81 |
| Venstre | 1,537 | 6.55 | -1.00 |
| Conservatives | 977 | 4.16 | -1.85 |
| Liberal Alliance | 705 | 3.01 | +2.14 |
| Total | 23,459 | | |

2009 European Parliament election in Denmark

| Parties | Vote | | |
| Parties | Votes | % | + / - |
|---|---|---|---|
| Green Left | 6,576 | 30.10 | +9.24 |
| Social Democrats | 4,326 | 19.80 | -7.64 |
| People's Movement against the EU | 3,062 | 14.01 | +3.21 |
| Social Liberals | 2,221 | 10.16 | -7.40 |
| Danish People's Party | 1,706 | 7.81 | +5.17 |
| Venstre | 1,650 | 7.55 | +1.27 |
| Conservatives | 1,313 | 6.01 | +0.88 |
| June Movement | 806 | 3.69 | -4.94 |
| Liberal Alliance | 190 | 0.87 | New |
| Total | 21,850 | | |

2004 European Parliament election in Denmark

| Parties | Vote | | |
| Parties | Votes | % | + / - |
|---|---|---|---|
| Social Democrats | 3,007 | 27.44 | +15.65 |
| Green Left | 2,286 | 20.86 | +3.79 |
| Social Liberals | 1,925 | 17.56 | +0.91 |
| People's Movement against the EU | 1,184 | 10.80 | -3.89 |
| June Movement | 946 | 8.63 | -11.48 |
| Venstre | 688 | 6.28 | -2.90 |
| Conservatives | 562 | 5.13 | +1.15 |
| Danish People's Party | 289 | 2.64 | -0.77 |
| Christian Democrats | 73 | 0.67 | +0.05 |
| Total | 10,960 | | |

1999 European Parliament election in Denmark

| Parties | Vote | | |
| Parties | Votes | % | + / - |
|---|---|---|---|
| June Movement | 2,158 | 20.11 | -5.41 |
| Green Left | 1,832 | 17.07 | +2.31 |
| Social Liberals | 1,787 | 16.65 | +7.50 |
| People's Movement against the EU | 1,576 | 14.69 | -6.61 |
| Social Democrats | 1,265 | 11.79 | +1.25 |
| Venstre | 985 | 9.18 | +2.51 |
| Conservatives | 427 | 3.98 | -4.31 |
| Danish People's Party | 366 | 3.41 | New |
| Centre Democrats | 268 | 2.50 | +1.40 |
| Christian Democrats | 66 | 0.62 | +0.12 |
| Progress Party | 17 | 0.16 | -2.02 |
| Total | 10,730 | | |

1994 European Parliament election in Denmark

| Parties | Vote | | |
| Parties | Votes | % | + / - |
|---|---|---|---|
| June Movement | 2,679 | 25.52 | New |
| People's Movement against the EU | 2,236 | 21.30 | -21.14 |
| Green Left | 1,549 | 14.76 | -5.63 |
| Social Democrats | 1,106 | 10.54 | -7.84 |
| Social Liberals | 961 | 9.15 | +6.90 |
| Conservatives | 870 | 8.29 | +2.89 |
| Venstre | 700 | 6.67 | +2.45 |
| Progress Party | 229 | 2.18 | -0.73 |
| Centre Democrats | 116 | 1.10 | -1.78 |
| Christian Democrats | 52 | 0.50 | -0.63 |
| Total | 10,498 | | |

1989 European Parliament election in Denmark

| Parties | Vote | | |
| Parties | Votes | % | + / - |
|---|---|---|---|
| People's Movement against the EU | 4,003 | 42.44 | +1.31 |
| Green Left | 1,923 | 20.39 | +2.70 |
| Social Democrats | 1,734 | 18.38 | -0.59 |
| Conservatives | 509 | 5.40 | -2.09 |
| Venstre | 398 | 4.22 | +2.93 |
| Progress Party | 274 | 2.91 | -0.03 |
| Centre Democrats | 272 | 2.88 | +0.55 |
| Social Liberals | 212 | 2.25 | +0.89 |
| Christian Democrats | 107 | 1.13 | +0.37 |
| Total | 9,432 | | |

1984 European Parliament election in Denmark

| Parties | Vote | |
| Parties | Votes | % |
|---|---|---|
| People's Movement against the EU | 4,309 | 41.13 |
| Social Democrats | 1,987 | 18.97 |
| Green Left | 1,853 | 17.69 |
| Conservatives | 785 | 7.49 |
| Left Socialists | 634 | 6.05 |
| Progress Party | 308 | 2.94 |
| Centre Democrats | 244 | 2.33 |
| Social Liberals | 142 | 1.36 |
| Venstre | 135 | 1.29 |
| Christian Democrats | 80 | 0.76 |
| Total | 10,477 | |

== Referendums ==
2022 Danish European Union opt-out referendum

| Option | Votes | % |
|---|---|---|
| ✓ YES | 22,042 | 69.63 |
| X NO | 9,614 | 30.37 |

2015 Danish European Union opt-out referendum

| Option | Votes | % |
|---|---|---|
| ✓ YES | 14,468 | 50.10 |
| X NO | 14,411 | 49.90 |

2014 Danish Unified Patent Court membership referendum

| Option | Votes | % |
|---|---|---|
| ✓ YES | 12,438 | 54.77 |
| X NO | 10,272 | 45.23 |

2009 Danish Act of Succession referendum

| Option | Votes | % |
|---|---|---|
| ✓ YES | 14,001 | 83.89 |
| X NO | 2,689 | 16.11 |

2000 Danish euro referendum

| Option | Votes | % |
|---|---|---|
| X NO | 9,342 | 53.64 |
| ✓ YES | 8,073 | 46.36 |

1998 Danish Amsterdam Treaty referendum

| Option | Votes | % |
|---|---|---|
| X NO | 8,264 | 55.08 |
| ✓ YES | 6,740 | 44.92 |

1993 Danish Maastricht Treaty referendum

| Option | Votes | % |
|---|---|---|
| X NO | 10,703 | 64.44 |
| ✓ YES | 5,907 | 35.56 |

1992 Danish Maastricht Treaty referendum

| Option | Votes | % |
|---|---|---|
| X NO | 11,348 | 70.74 |
| ✓ YES | 4,694 | 29.26 |

1986 Danish Single European Act referendum

| Option | Votes | % |
|---|---|---|
| X NO | 11,055 | 77.15 |
| ✓ YES | 3,275 | 22.85 |

1972 Danish European Communities membership referendum

| Option | Votes | % |
|---|---|---|
| X NO | 16,711 | 64.98 |
| ✓ YES | 9,005 | 35.02 |

1953 Danish constitutional and electoral age referendum

| Option | Votes | % |
|---|---|---|
| ✓ YES | 6,245 | 71.56 |
| X NO | 2,482 | 28.44 |
| 21 years | 4,964 | 54.95 |
| 23 years | 4,070 | 45.05 |

1939 Danish constitutional referendum

| Option | Votes | % |
|---|---|---|
| ✓ YES | 9,979 | 96.66 |
| X NO | 345 | 3.34 |
