= Mehmet Çakıcı =

Turkish Cypriot politician and psychiatrist

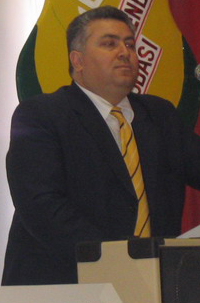

Personal details
- Born: 13 September 1966 (age 59) Nicosia, Cyprus
- Education: Marmara University

Mehmet Çakıcı (born 13 September 1966) is a Turkish Cypriot politician and psychiatrist. He served as the first leader of the Communal Democracy Party (TDP) between 2007 and 2013 and has been a member of the Assembly of the Republic since 2003. He then served as an independent member of the parliament for the Lefkoşa District, having resigned from the TDP in November 2016 and founded a new party, the Communal Liberation Party. His tenure as an MP ended in 2018 after his party failed to reach the election threshold.

== Early life and professional career ==
Çakıcı was born in Nicosia, the capital of Cyprus, in 1966. He graduated from the Atatürk Primary School, Bayraktar Middle School and the Lefkoşa Türk Lisesi (Nicosia Turkish High School), and started his medical degree in the Marmara University of Istanbul in 1985. In 1991 and 1992 he completed his foundation training in psychiatry in London and became a specialist in psychiatry in the Bakırköy Psychiatric Hospital after training between 1994 and 1998. Between 1996 and 2000, he also completed a PhD in forensic medicine in the Marmara University. He won the 70th Year Special Award of the Bakırköy Psychiatric Hospital and Best Research Award at the 33rd Turkish National Congress of Psychiatry in 1997 with an article he published. He worked the prevent the use of drugs by students in Istanbul.

In 1998, he returned to Cyprus. He received an award from the Turkish Cypriot Security Forces Command for his successful work aimed at reducing suicides in the Turkish Cypriot military and became the head of the Psychology Department of the Faculty of Sciences and Literature of the Near East University. He became an associate professor in 2001. He then sustained an active life in non-governmental professional organizations, including the leadership of the Turkish Cypriot Association of Mental Disorders and the Secretary General of the Turkish Cypriot Medical Association. In 2001, he opened the first substance addiction treatment center in Northern Cyprus with beds. He also established the Turkish Cypriot Mental Health Institute.

He has published over 60 scientific articles and nine books (as of 2009) on violence against women and child abuse.

== Political career ==
He was one of the founding members of the Peace and Democracy Movement (BDH) in 2003 and was elected as a member of the parliament for the Lefkoşa District from the BDH in the 2003 parliamentary election. He became the party's secretary general in 2004. He was subsequently re-elected as a member of the parliament in 2009 and 2013. After the merger of the BDH and the Communal Liberation Party in 2007, he became the first leader of the Communal Democracy Party. He resigned from his position in 2013, after his party won 3 seats in the parliament in what he deemed as a failure to keep his promise.

In November 2016, Çakıcı resigned from the TDP, claiming that the party had been rendered a place where nepotism was rife by the policies of his successor, Cemal Özyiğit. Being bound by law to continue as an independent MP for the rest of his term, he founded a new party with the name Communal Liberation Party, and became the president of its board of directors.

== Private life ==
He is married to the psychiatrist associate professor Ebru Çakıcı and has a son and a daughter.
