= Pacifist (disambiguation) =

A pacifist is one who opposes war, militarism, or violence.

Pacifist may also refer to:

- a member of a Pacifist organization
- a member of a Pacifist Party (disambiguation)
- a believer of a pacifist faith
- The Pacifist (film), a 1970 film
- "The Pacifist", a 1956 Arthur C Clarke short story
