= Peace Party =

Peace Party or Pacifist Party may refer to:

== Political parties ==
- Australian Peace Party, a political party in Australia
- Communist Workers' Party – For Peace and Socialism, a political party in Finland
- Democratic Peace Party, a political party in Egypt
- ECOPEACE Party, a political party in South Africa
- German Peace Union, a former political party in West Germany
- Hungarian Communist Party, a political party in Hungary known as the Peace Party (1943–1944)
- Lebanese Peace Party, a political party in Lebanon
- Nationalist Peace Party, a political party in Northern Cyprus
- Oregon Progressive Party, a political party in the United States
- Party for Democracy and Peace, a former political party in South Korea
- Peace and Freedom Party, a political party in the United States
  - Freedom and Peace Party, a defunct schism of the above party led by Dick Gregory
- Peace and Progress Party, a political party in the United Kingdom
- Peace Party, an English political faction during the Civil War; see Eleven Members
- Peace Party (India), a political party in India
- Peace Party (Turkey), an Alevi political party founded in 1996
- Peace Party (UK), a political party in the United Kingdom
- Peace Politics People's Party, a defunct political party in Denmark
- Prosperous Peace Party, a political party in Indonesia
- The Eco-pacifist Greens, a political party in Spain

== Other uses ==
- Woman's Peace Party, the forerunner of the Women's International League for Peace and Freedom
- World Peace Party, a warehouse rave in South Africa held on 13 September 1990

== See also ==
- Category:Pacifist parties
