= National Rebirth Party =

National Rebirth Party may refer to:

- National Rebirth Party (Burkina Faso), a former political party in Burkina Faso
- National Rebirth Party (Northern Cyprus), a political party in Northern Cyprus
- National Rebirth Party (United Kingdom), a political party in the United Kingdom
