= Solution and EU Party =

Political party in Northern Cyprus (2003)

The Solution and EU Party (Turkish: Çözüm ve AB Partisi, ÇABP) was a political party in Northern Cyprus that never gained parliamentary representation. It was founded in 2003 as an economically right-wing, socially liberal party to promote the reunification of Cyprus under the Annan Plan. It contrasted itself with the other pro-reunification parties, all of which were left-wing. It was dissolved after failing to enter the parliament in the 2003 elections.

== History ==
The party was founded on 21 August 2003 with Ali Erel, the head of the Turkish Cypriot Chamber of Commerce at the time, as its president. Its board of founders was also mostly composed of businesspeople that were members of the Chamber of Commerce. After the submission of the party's founding documents to the Ministry of the Interior on 22 August 2003, Erel held a press conference at Saray Hotel in Nicosia to declare the party's principles. It issued an open call for candidates on 13 October 2003 for the parliamentary election on 15 December. Pre-election polls estimated the party's vote share to be between 2% and 6%. If the party cleared 5%, it would have been able to enter parliament; Etyen Mahçupyan claimed that this would determine whether the pro-solution bloc would be able to claim a majority in the election.

It dissolved after failing to enter parliament.

== Political positions ==
The party's raison d'être was to support the reunification of Cyprus under the terms of the Annan Plan, and therefore to ensure EU membership for Turkish Cypriots. Erel, its founding president, stated that it was intended as a liberal and economically right-wing pro-solution alternative, as all other parties supporting reunification at the time (spearheaded by the Republican Turkish Party) were of leftist origins. According to Erel, the party would have represented those that were opposed to Rauf Denktaş but were also unwilling to support the social democratic or socialist economic policies promoted by other pro-solution parties. His claim was that this represented up to 30% of Turkish Cypriot society at the time. With this political position, the party explicitly aimed to gain votes from the right-wing but anti-reunification National Unity Party (UBP) and Democratic Party (DP); it was indeed noted that a number of the founders had previously been associated with the DP leader Serdar Denktaş.

It was reported by Ali Bizden that the party was the result of a breakdown of the talks between the Republican Turkish Party (CTP) and the team of Ali Erel. The CTP had initially declared itself the home of all pro-solution forces and added the "United Forces" label to its name, and subsequently worked for Erel to contest the election on their list. Erel had demanded co-presidency of the movement, and upon the refusal of the CTP, the deal had fallen apart. The party ended up signing an agreement with the Republican Turkish Party and the Peace and Democracy Movement on common pro-solution principles, pledging to collaborate to form a coalition after the election if possible, and also to never collaborate with anti-solution parties.
