= Siber cabinet =

Siber cabinet Siber Hükümeti
- 24th Cabinet of Northern Cyprus
- 6 June 2013 – 2 September 2013
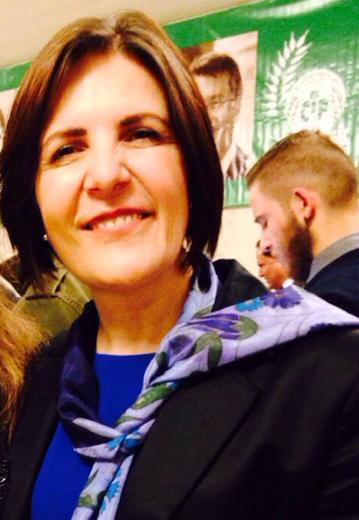
- Date formed: 6 June 2013
- Date dissolved: 2 September 2013

People and organisations
- Head of state: Derviş Eroğlu
- Head of government: Sibel Siber
- No. of ministers: 10
- Member parties: Republican Turkish Party (CTP); Democratic Party (DP); Communal Democracy Party (TDP)
- Status in legislature: Coalition
- Opposition party: National Unity Party
- Opposition leader: İrsen Küçük

History
- Election: 19 April 2009
- Legislature term: 13th
- Predecessor: Küçük
- Successor: Yorgancıoğlu

Siber cabinet was the government of Northern Cyprus between 6 June 2013 and 2 September 2013, led by Prime Minister Sibel Siber. It was formed as an interim caretaker government after the Küçük cabinet led by İrsen Küçük of the National Unity Party fell in a vote of no confidence. It led Northern Cyprus until the 2013 parliamentary election.

== Composition ==
The composition of the cabinet was as seen below:

Office	Name	Party
Prime Minister	Sibel Siber	CTP
Minister of Foreign Affairs	Kutlay Erk	CTP
Minister of Finance	Zeren Mungan	CTP
Minister of Interior and Local Administration	Gülsün Yücel	CTP
Minister of Labor and Social Security	Aziz Gürpınar	CTP
Minister of Transport and Public Works	İsmail Başarır	DP
Minister of Economy and Energy	Atay Ahmet Raşit	DP
Minister of Health	Nuri Gökşin	DP
Minister of National Education, Youth and Sports	Asım İdris	TDP
Minister of Agriculture and Natural Resources	Sami Dayıoğlu	TDP
Minister of Tourism, Environment and Culture	Mehmet Harmancı	TDP
