= Communal Liberation Party New Forces =

Communal Liberation Party New Forces Toplumcu Kurtuluş Partisi Yeni Güçler
- Leader: Mehmet Çakıcı
- Founded: November 2016
- Dissolved: October 2022
- Split from: Communal Democracy Party
- Merged into: Communal Democracy Party
- Headquarters: North Nicosia, Northern Cyprus
- Ideology: Social democracy
- Political position: Centre-left
- Colours: Red and white

Website
- tkpyenigucler.org

Communal Liberation Party New Forces (Turkish: Toplumcu Kurtuluş Partisi Yeni Güçler, TKP-YG) was a centre-left political party in Northern Cyprus. It is led by Mehmet Çakıcı. It was founded in 2016 after a group headed by Çakıcı broke off from the Communal Democracy Party (TDP).

== History ==
Çakıcı and former MP Mustafa Emiroğluları resigned from the TDP on 25 November 2016. This was followed by the resignation of 70 other members of the TDP, mostly originating from the historical Communal Liberation Party (TKP), on 28 November 2016. The rationale given for these resignations was what they saw as "undemocratic" policies employed by the TDP leadership under Cemal Özyiğit and "the restriction of the freedom of speech within the party" after an election for the head of the Güzelyurt District. This had culminated in disciplinary action against Emiroğluları, with the aim of expelling him from the party. Çakıcı and his fellows claimed that this was because Emiroğluları wanted to change the name of the TDP back to "Communal Liberation Party" and also claimed that no new memberships had been allowed in the party for 6 months. Özyiğit had countered these by saying that "he was not concerned by personal business of this sort".

Çakıcı founded the party using the name "Communal Liberation Party" (TKP) on 28 November 2016.

In January 2017, Sonay Adem, Ali Gulle and İbrahim Korhan, a group of political figures from Gazimağusa District, resigned from the Republican Turkish Party and joined the TKP. In the meanwhile, the High Administrative Court ruled that the establishment of a new party under the name "Communal Liberation Party" should be suspended. As a result of this and an agreement with the new members, the party changed its name to "Communal Liberation Party New Forces" on 19 January.

On 13 March 2017, the Social Democratic Party merged into the TKP-YG.

On 26 October 2017, it agreed with the United Cyprus Party to contest the election together under the TKP-YG list. This alliance was named the "Change and Liberation Alliance".

In October 2022, the TKP-YG merged back into the Communal Democracy Party.

The party's newspapers were Ortam, which used to be the TDP's newspaper but had Çakıcı as its majority shareholder, and Haberatör.
