= Communal Democracy Party =

Communal Democracy Party Toplumcu Demokrasi Partisi
- Leader: Zeki Çeler
- Founded: May 2007
- Merger of: TKP and BDH
- Headquarters: North Nicosia, Northern Cyprus
- Ideology: Social democracy United Cyprus; Cypriotism
- Political position: Centre-left
- International affiliation: Socialist International
- Colours: Red, Blue, White
- Parliament: 0 / 50
- Municipalities: 1 / 18

Website
- tdpkibris.org

The Communal Democracy Party (Turkish: Toplumcu Demokrasi Partisi, TDP) is a social-democratic political party in the Turkish Republic of Northern Cyprus. The party came into being in May 2007 as a merger of the Peace and Democracy Movement with the Communal Liberation Party. At the 2009 legislative elections for the Assembly of the Republic in the Turkish Republic of Northern Cyprus, the TDP, in its first elections, won 2 out of 50 seats and 6.87% of the popular vote. In 2013, it took part in the interim Siber cabinet with three ministers. At the 2013 legislative elections, the party increased its share of the vote to 7.41% and its number of MPs to 3. The TDP currently holds the mayorship of the Nicosia Turkish Municipality with Mehmet Harmancı.

In November 2016, MP Mehmet Çakıcı, the founder of the party and its leader until 2013, resigned from the party, as did former MP Mustafa Emiroğulları and 70 other members including the former Minister of Agriculture Sami Dayıoğlu. Many of these members had originated from the Communal Liberation Party and they criticised what they saw as the nepotism by Cemal Özyiğit. They went on to form a new party under the same name as their political origin.

== 2015 Turkish Cypriot presidential campaign ==
On 13 March 2015, Mustafa Akıncı, a former member of the parliament from the party, completed his application to run for presidency, and was endorsed by the Communal Democracy Party.

During his campaign, he put his voice forward regarding the ghost town Varosha, which is a very lively topic regarding the Cyprus problem. It was possible to see that Akıncı favoured a settling approach to solve this problem. Regarding Varosha, Akıncı stated that, "Instead of living side by side a corpse let Varosha become a lively city where people live, contractors from both communities do business together and young people can find jobs".

Akıncı went on to the second round by receiving 26.94% of the votes in the first round, and was elected president in the second round with 60.5% of the votes.

The TDP became a consultative member of the Socialist International in November 2015. It was upgraded to full membership in 2017.

== Party platform/ideology ==
The TDP's official party program identifies the party as a social democratic, and leftist. On the Cyprus Problem, TDP argues for a solution which leads to a United Cyprus by "developing the power of self-government, to establish peace and security in the bi-communal, bi-zonal, United Federal Republic of Cyprus, which will be established on the basis of political equality with the Greek Cypriot community."

== Election results ==
Assembly of the Republic
Election	Votes			Seats		Role
Election	#	%	Rank	#	±	Role
2009	97,334	6.9	4th	2 / 50	new	in opposition
2013	92,110	7.4	4th	3 / 50	▲1	in opposition
2018	463,081	8.6	4th	3 / 50	0	CTP–HP–TDP–DP coalition
2022	220,610	4.4	6th	0 / 50	▼3	extra-parliamentary

== See also ==
- Category:Communal Democracy Party politicians
