= Nationalist Peace Party =

The Nationalist Peace Party (Turkish: Milliyetçi Barış Partisi) is a political party in Northern Cyprus without parliamentary representation.
