= National Rebirth Party (Northern Cyprus) =

The National Rebirth Party (Turkish: Ulusal Diriliş Partisi) is a political party in Northern Cyprus without parliamentary representation. The party, led by Enver Emin, had representation after the 1998 elections. The party merged with the Democratic Party.
