= Peace and Democracy Movement =

Political party in Northern Cyprus

Peace and Democracy Movement Barış ve Demokrasi Hareketi
- Abbreviation: BDH
- Leader: Mustafa Akıncı
- Founded: 2000
- Dissolved: May 2007
- Merged into: TDP
- Ideology: Social democracy Cypriotism
- Political position: Center-left

The Peace and Democracy Movement (Turkish: Barış ve Demokrasi Hareketi) was a social democratic political party in the de facto Turkish Republic of Northern Cyprus. In the legislative elections for the House of Representatives of Northern Cyprus on 20 January 2005 the party won 5.8% of the popular vote and 1 out of the 50 seats in the assembly.

The last leader of BDH was Mustafa Akıncı, a deputy in TRNC Assembly of the Republic. In May 2007, it merged with the Communal Liberation Party to form the Communal Democracy Party.

== See also ==
- Category:Peace and Democracy Movement politicians
