= 1972 Danish European Communities membership referendum =

2 October 1972
- Should Denmark join the European Economic Community?

Results
Choice	Votes	%
Yes	1,958,043	63.29%
No	1,135,755	36.71%
Valid votes	3,093,798	99.38%
Invalid or blank votes	19,323	0.62%
Total votes	3,113,121	100.00%
Registered voters/turnout	3,453,763	90.14%
- Results by nomination district and constituency Yes: 50–55% 55–60% 60–65% 65–70% 70%+ No: 50–55% 55–60% 60–65% 65–70% 70%+

A referendum on joining the European Economic Community was held in Denmark on 2 October 1972. The result was 63% in favour with a turnout of 90%. The law that Denmark should be member of the EEC was passed on 11 October 1972, and Denmark became a member on 1 January 1973.

== Background ==
According to Article 20, section 2 of the Danish constitution, any law that makes limitations to the sovereignty of the Danish state (as membership of the EEC would) must be passed in the Danish parliament with 5/6 of the parliament's members voting for the law. If a majority of members vote for the law, but not by 5/6 majority, and the government wishes to uphold the suggested law, the law can still be passed in a public referendum, as was the case in the 1972 referendum.

According to a 2022 study, municipalities that experienced more German-inflicted violence during the German occupation of Denmark in WWII were more likely to vote against joining the EEC.

== Results ==
Choice	Votes	%
For	1,958,043	63.29
Against	1,135,755	36.71
Total	3,093,798	100.00
Valid votes	3,093,798	99.38
Invalid/blank votes	19,323	0.62
Total votes	3,113,121	100.00
Registered voters/turnout	3,453,763	90.14
Source: Nohlen & Stöver

== See also ==
- Danish withdrawal from the European Union
