= Free Social Democrats =

Defunct political party in Denmark

The Free Social Democrats (Danish: Frie Socialdemokrater) were a political party in Denmark.

== History ==
The party was established in March 1920 by Emil Marott, a Member of Parliament between 1903 and 1920 for the Social Democrats. In 1920 he was expelled from the party because of diverging opinions on the Schleswig issue.

The party ran on a platform of returning Flensburg to Danish rule following the Schleswig Plebiscites, and contested all three Folketing elections held in 1920, but failed to win a seat.

== Election results ==
Folketinget
Date	Votes			Seats		Position	Size
Date	No.	%	± pp	No.	±	Position	Size
April 1920	7,260	0.71	New	0 / 140	New	Extra-parliamentary	7th
July 1920	Did not run.						
September 1920	6,460	0.53	▼0.18	0 / 149	0	Extra-parliamentary	7th
