= 1986 Danish Single European Act referendum =

- 27 February 1986

Results
Choice	Votes	%
Yes	1,629,786	56.23%
No	1,268,483	43.77%
Valid votes	2,898,269	99.00%
Invalid or blank votes	29,383	1.00%
Total votes	2,927,652	100.00%
Registered voters/turnout	3,883,429	75.39%
- Results by nomination district and constituency. Yes: 50–55% 55–60% 60–65% 65–70% 70%+ No: 50–55% 55–60% 60–65% 65–70% 70%+

A non-binding referendum on the Single European Act was held in Denmark on 27 February 1986. It was approved by 56% of voters, with a voter turnout of 75%.

The referendum was held by the government of the Prime Minister of Denmark, Poul Schlüter. The government was in favour of Denmark ratifying the Single European Act, but a majority in parliament voted against it. The referendum was the last Europe-related referendum in which parties such as the Social Democrats and the Social Liberal Party were against ratification.

== Results ==
Choice	Votes	%
For	1,629,786	56.23
Against	1,268,483	43.77
Total	2,898,269	100.00
Valid votes	2,898,269	99.00
Invalid/blank votes	29,383	1.00
Total votes	2,927,652	100.00
Registered voters/turnout	3,883,429	75.39
Source: Nohlen & Stöver
