= Peace Politics People's Party =

Peace Politics People's Party Fredspolitisk Folkeparti
- Abbreviation: FF
- Leader: Aage Bertelsen
- Founded: 15 December 1963
- Dissolved: after 1971
- Split from: Danish Social Liberal Party
- Ideology: Liberalism; Pacifism; Anti-NATO
- Political position: Centre to centre-left

The Peace Politics People's Party (Danish: Fredspolitisk Folkeparti, FF) was a pacifist, liberal political party in Denmark.

== History ==
The party was founded on 16 December 1963 by a group of pacifists who opposed Danish membership of NATO. In March 1964, a Socialist People's Party MP left to join the FF, giving it parliamentary representation. In the 1964 general elections the party received just 0.4% of the vote, failing to win a seat.

The party was disbanded in the end of the 1970s.
