= Visa requirements for Northern Cypriot citizens =

Administrative entry restrictions

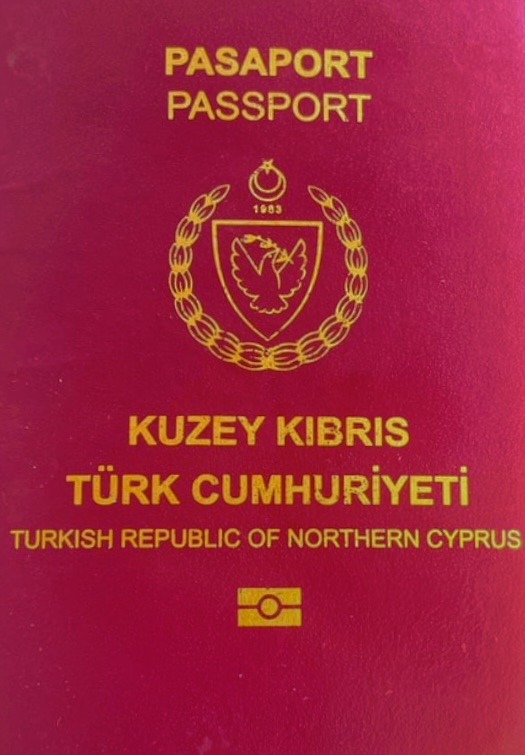
Northern Cypriot passport

Visa requirements for Northern Cypriot citizens are administrative entry restrictions by the authorities of other states placed on citizens of Northern Cyprus.

== Visa requirements ==
Holders of an ordinary Northern Cypriot passport can visit one country (Turkey) without the need to obtain an entry visa. The passport is accepted as a travel document by only three countries because Northern Cyprus has limited international recognition. Usually, no visa is placed in the document.

Country	Visa requirements		
Country	Regular passports	Special and Service passports	Diplomatic passports
Turkey	Visa not required A valid ID card is enough for passing	Visa not required A valid ID card is enough for passing	Visa not required A valid ID card is enough for passing

== Consular protection of Northern Cypriot citizens abroad ==
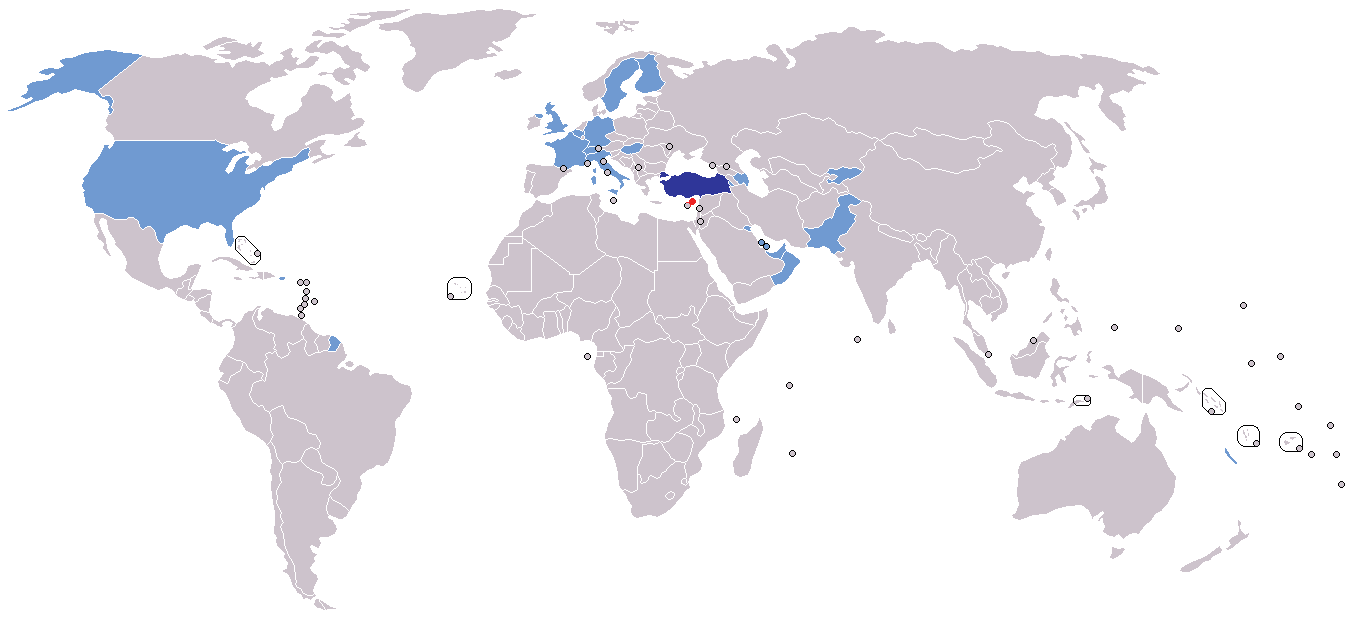
Embassy Non-Diplomatic Representative Office Turkish Republic of Northern Cyprus

Northern Cyprus is recognized only by Turkey, and consequently has only one embassy with de jure recognition, along with three consulates. However, it has representative offices in several countries.

== See also ==
- Northern Cypriot passport
- Foreign relations of Northern Cyprus
- List of nationalities forbidden at border
- Northern Cypriot identity card
- Visa policy of Northern Cyprus
- Foreign relations of Northern Cyprus
- List of diplomatic missions of Northern Cyprus
- List of diplomatic missions in Northern Cyprus
