= Visa policy of Turkey =

Policy on permits required to enter Turkey

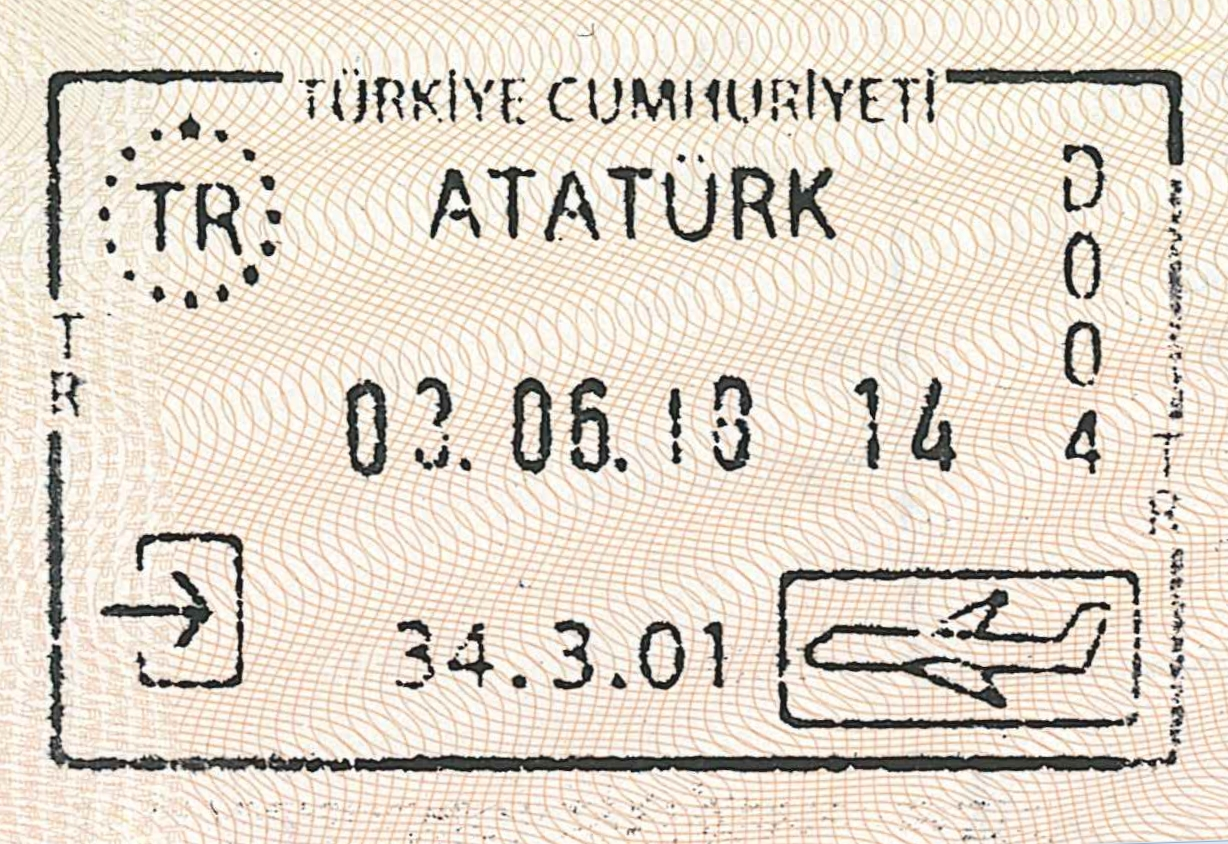
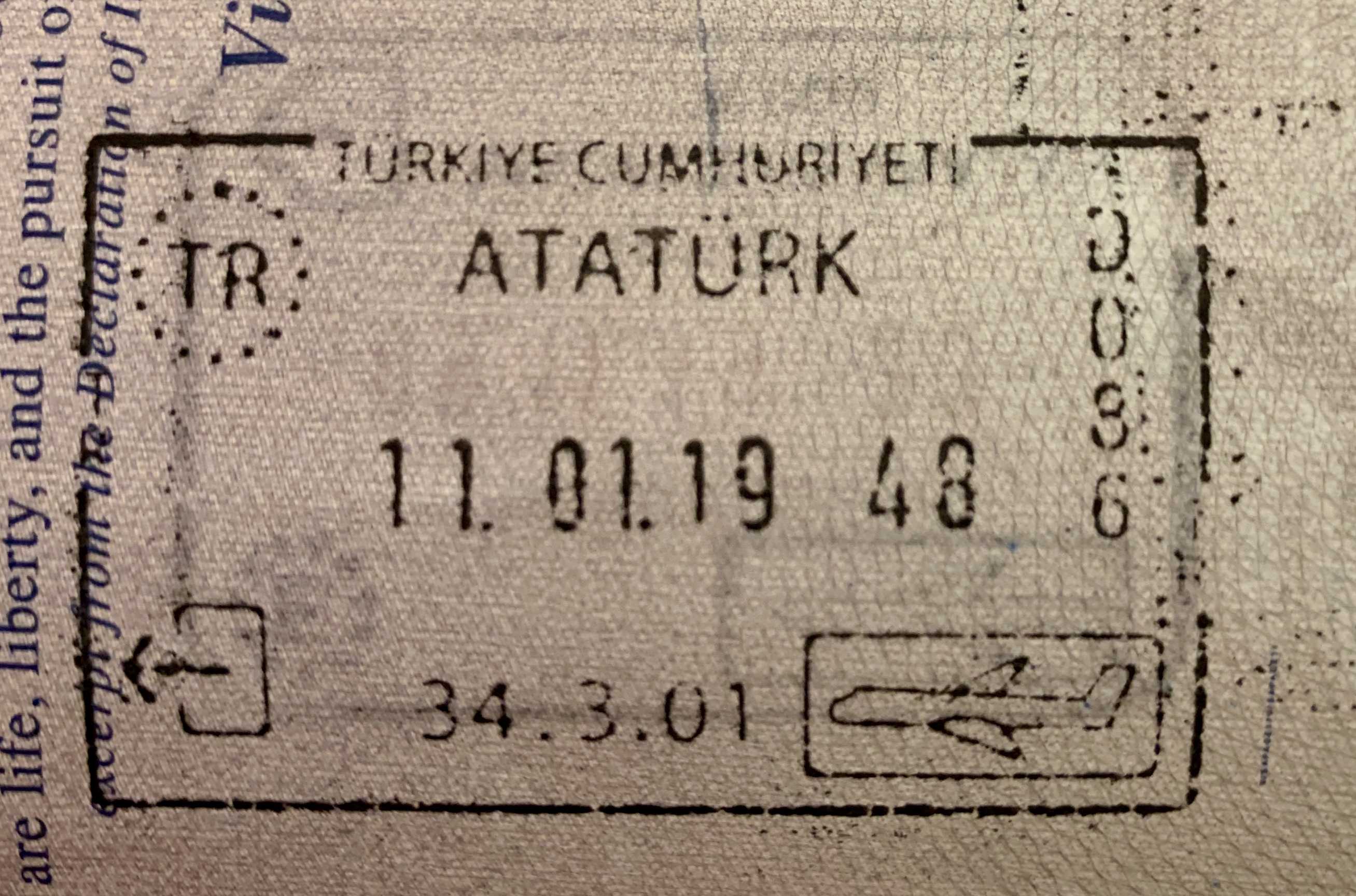
Turkish entry and exit passport stamps issued at Istanbul Atatürk Airport

The visa policy of Turkey is the policy by which Turkish Government determines visa requirements for visitors to Turkey and those seeking to work, study or reside there. Anyone who does not have right of abode in Turkey (Turkish citizens and Turkish Cypriot citizens) requires entry permission to enter Turkey. "Visa nationals" must always obtain entry clearance by obtaining a visa in advance of travelling to Turkey from Turkish diplomatic mission responsible for area of their residency, (Note: Certain visa nationals may apply for electronic visas.) and "non-visa nationals" may travel as a visitor to Turkey for up to ninety days within any one-hundred-eighty-day period without a visa.

== Document validity requirements ==
Turkey requires visitors from all jurisdictions holding ordinary passports to have their documents valid for at least 60 days beyond the maximum duration of stay. For example, British citizens holding ordinary passports may be granted maximum 90-day duration of stay (within any 180-day period) without a visa. Thus their passports must be valid for at least 150 days when seeking entry into the country.

== Council of Europe treaties ==
Under the European Agreement on Regulations governing the Movement of Persons between Member States of the Council of Europe, Turkey maintains special facilitations to citizens of some European countries.
Citizens of Azerbaijan, Belgium, Bulgaria, France, Georgia, Germany, Greece, Hungary, Italy, Liechtenstein, Luxembourg, Malta, Moldova, the Netherlands, Northern Cyprus, Poland, Portugal, Romania, Spain, Switzerland, and Ukraine may use their ID cards instead of their passports to visit Turkey.
Citizens of Belgium, France, Luxembourg, Portugal, Spain, and Switzerland may use ‘a passport expired for less than five years’, and citizens of Germany may use ‘a passport or an ID card expired for less than one year’ when entering Turkey.
Document validity requirements do not apply to citizens of countries holding specified documents above. These requirements do not apply to citizens of Bulgaria holding ordinary passports as well; they are only required to present valid passport for duration of stay.
Even though the facilitations by Turkey mentioned above, these are not reciprocated by said European countries towards Turkish citizens, except for Azerbaijan, Georgia, Moldova, Northern Cyprus, and Ukraine, where Turkish citizens may visit with valid ID cards.

== Comparison with the visa policy of the European Union ==
Even though being a candidate for membership of the EU, Turkish and EU visa policies differ towards each other and third countries. Turkey requires visas from citizens of Schengen Annex II countries and territories – Antigua and Barbuda, Bahamas, Barbados, Dominica, East Timor, Grenada, Kiribati, Marshall Islands, Mauritius, Mexico, Micronesia, Palau, Saint Kitts and Nevis, Saint Lucia, Saint Vincent and the Grenadines, Samoa, Solomon Islands, Taiwan, Tonga, and Tuvalu. However, citizens of most of these countries may apply for electronic visas.
On the other hand, Turkey grants visa-free access to citizens of Schengen Annex I countries and territories – Azerbaijan, Belarus, Bahrain, Belize, Bolivia, China, Ecuador, Indonesia, Iran, Jordan, Kazakhstan, Kuwait, Kyrgyzstan, Lebanon, Mongolia, Morocco, Oman, Qatar, Russia, Saudi Arabia, Thailand, Tunisia, Uzbekistan as well as Northern Cyprus. (Note: European Union does not recognize the sovereignty of the Turkish Republic of Northern Cyprus and it does not list the country on Appendix I or II. However some EU members accept Turkish Cypriot passport for visa applications primarily at their offices in North Nicosia.)
Turkey does not require visas from citizens of the EU and EFTA members, except for the Republic of Cyprus, whose citizens are required visas due to the Cyprus issue however, they can apply for electronic visas or may be exempted from visa requirement under certain circumstances.
On contrary to facilitations provided to the European Union and EFTA citizens, EU and EFTA members still require visas from Turkish citizens unlike the other candidate members’ citizens.

== Visa policy map ==
Visa policy of Turkey Turkey Unlimited period Visa not required - may enter with an ID card (90 days) Visa not required (90 days) Visa not required (60 days) Visa not required (30 days) Visa not required - conditional (90 days) eVisa (30 days) eVisa - conditional (30 days) Visa required

== Visa exemption ==
=== Ordinary passports ===
Citizens of the following countries and territories may enter Turkey without a visa for business and tourist purposes for stays up to the duration listed below. For visits of up to 90 days within any 180-day period, an identity card is accepted instead of a passport for citizens of some countries. Visitors are not permitted to work and recourse to public funds.

Unlimited period

- Northern Cyprus^{ID1}

90 days within any 180 days

- European Union member states (except Cyprus)^{ID2}

- Albania^{T}
- Andorra
- Argentina
- Australia
- Azerbaijan^{ID3}
- Bahrain^{T}
- Belize
- Bolivia
- Bosnia and Herzegovina
- Brazil
- Canada^{T}
- Chile
- China^{T 1}
- Colombia
- Ecuador
- El Salvador
- Georgia^{ID3}
- Guatemala
- Honduras
- Hong Kong^{1}
- Iceland
- Iran
- Israel
- Japan
- Jordan^{T}
- Kazakhstan
- Kosovo^{T}
- Kuwait
- Kyrgyzstan
- Lebanon^{T}
- Liechtenstein^{ID3}
- Malaysia
- Moldova^{ID3}
- Monaco
- Montenegro
- Morocco
- New Zealand
- Nicaragua
- North Macedonia
- Norway
- Oman^{T}
- Panama
- Paraguay
- Peru
- Qatar^{T}
- San Marino
- Saudi Arabia^{T}
- Serbia
- Seychelles
- Singapore
- South Korea
- Switzerland^{ID3}
- Trinidad and Tobago
- Tunisia
- Ukraine^{ID3}
- United Arab Emirates
- United Kingdom^{2}
- United States^{T}
- Uruguay
- Uzbekistan
- Vatican City
- Venezuela

60 days per entry, 90 days within any 180 days

- Russia^{3}

30 days per entry, 90 days within any 180 days

- Brunei
- Costa Rica
- Indonesia^{T}
- Macau^{T 1}
- Mongolia
- Thailand

30 days per entry, 90 days within any 1 year

- Belarus

_{ID1 - Citizens of the Turkish Republic of Northern Cyprus have the right to enter, reside, study, and work indefinitely in Turkey without any immigration restrictions.}
_{ID2 - Citizens of Belgium, Bulgaria, France, Germany, Greece, Hungary, Italy, Luxembourg, Malta, the Netherlands, Poland, Portugal, Romania and Spain may enter with an ID card for up to 90 days within any 180-day period.}
_{ID3 - May enter with an ID card for up to 90 days within any 180-day period.}
_{T - For tourist purposes only.}
_{1 - For Chinese citizens with People's Republic of China passports, Hong Kong Special Administrative Region passports or Macau Special Administrative Region passports only.}
_{2 - For British citizens only.}
_{3 - Excluding journalists that are on duty.}

=== Conditional visa exemption ===
90 days within any 180 days

- Algeria^{T 2}
- Cyprus^{T 3}
- Iraq^{T 2}
- Libya^{T 1}

_{T - For tourist purposes only.}
_{1 - Provided that the age is below 16 or above 45 years old.}
_{2 - Provided that the age is below 15 or above 50 years old.}
_{3 - Provided that they reside in Northern Cyprus and directly arriving from Ercan International Airport; or seaports of Famagusta, Gemikonağı, or Kyrenia.}

Date of visa changes
- 3 December 2010: Serbia (Note: Citizens of this country were eligible to apply for an electronic visa before the visa exemption came into force.)
- 2 March 2020: Austria, Belgium, Croatia, Ireland, Malta, the Netherlands, Norway, Poland, Portugal, Spain, and the United Kingdom.
- 21 December 2021: Indonesia
- 23 December 2023: Bahrain, Canada, Oman, Saudi Arabia, the United Arab Emirates, and the United States.
- 2 January 2026: China
- 17 April 2026: Australia

Cancelled:

- 14 September 2022: Turkmenistan
- 6 April 2024: Tajikistan
- 1 May 2025: Saint Kitts and Nevis

=== Cruise ship passengers ===
Passengers of cruise ships may be allowed to enter Turkey without a visa, but with a visitor permit issued by officers of the docked port under authority of governor of respective city. Visitor permits shall be used to visit the port city only (and neighbouring cities depending on the permit) where the ship docked and the validity shall not be longer than seventy two hours.

=== Non-ordinary passports ===
Under reciprocal agreements, holders of diplomatic or service passports or laissez-passers issued by the following jurisdictions are allowed to enter and remain in Turkey for up to 90 days in any 180 days, unless otherwise noted:

- European Union member states^{D S} (except Bulgaria, Cyprus and Ireland)

- Algeria^{D S}
- Angola^{D S}
- Azerbaijan^{D S}
- Bahamas^{D S}
- Bangladesh^{D S}
- Barbados^{D S}
- Bulgaria^{D S 1}
- Burkina Faso^{D}
- Burundi^{D}
- Cambodia^{D S 1}
- Republic of the Congo^{D}
- DR Congo^{D}
- China^{1 D S}
- Cuba^{D S}
- Djibouti^{D S}
- Egypt^{D S}
- Ethiopia^{D}
- Fiji^{D S}
- Gabon^{D}
- Gambia^{D}
- Grenada^{D S}
- Guinea^{D}
- Guyana^{D S}
- India^{D}
- Iraq^{D S}
- Ireland^{D}
- Israel^{D S}
- Ivory Coast^{D S}
- Jamaica^{D S}
- Kenya^{D S}
- Laos^{D}
- Libya^{D S}
- Mali^{D}
- Mauritania^{D S}
- Mauritius^{D S}
- Mexico^{D}
- Mongolia^{D S 1}
- Mozambique^{D S}
- Namibia^{D S}
- Niger^{D S}
- Nigeria^{D}
- North Cyprus^{D S}
- Pakistan^{D S}
- Palestine^{D}
- Philippines^{D S 1}
- Russia^{D S^{2}} ^{1}
- Rwanda^{D S}
- Saint Kitts and Nevis^{D S}
- Saint Lucia^{D S}
- Saint Vincent and the Grenadines^{D S}
- Senegal^{D}
- Sierra Leone^{D S}
- South Africa^{D S 1}
- South Sudan^{T D}
- Sudan^{T D}
- Tajikistan^{D S*}
- Tanzania^{D S}
- Thailand^{D S}
- Togo^{D}
- Turkmenistan^{D S 1}
- Uganda^{D}
- United Kingdom^{D 2}
- Vietnam^{D S}
- Zambia^{D}

_{D - Diplomatic passports}
_{S - Service passports}
_{S* - For holders of service passports: 30 days, but no more than 90 days within any 180-day period.}
_{T - For tourist purposes only.}
_{1 - 30 days}
_{2 - For British citizens only.}

(United Nations) UN laissez-passer holders who have blue UN travel documents shall be exempted from entry visa requirement for their official visits to Turkey for up to 90 days within any 180-day period if they can certify their official assignment. Otherwise, general visa provisions shall apply.

Holders of red UN Travel Document shall be exempted from entry visa and may stay in Turkey for up to 90 days within any 180-day period regardless of their purpose of visit.

=== Future changes ===
Turkey has signed visa exemption agreements with the following countries, but they have not yet entered into force:

Country	Passports	Agreement signed on
Maldives	Ordinary	28 January 2022

== Electronic visa (e-Visa) ==
Türkiye Cumhuriyeti e-Vize
- Owner: Turkish Foreign Office
- Website: evisa.gov.tr

Citizens of the following countries and territories are required visas to enter Turkey. However they may apply for an electronic visa (e-Visa) for short term visits. (Note: For touristic or business visits.) Electronic visas may be issued with duration of stay for up to 90 days with multiple entries (unless otherwise noted) in any 180 days. Visitors are not permitted to work and recourse to public funds.

- Antigua and Barbuda
- Armenia^{S}
- Bahamas
- Barbados
- Cyprus^{S}
- Dominican Republic
- Fiji^{S}
- Grenada
- Haiti
- Jamaica
- Maldives
- Mauritius^{S}
- Mexico^{F S}
- Namibia^{S}
- Saint Lucia
- Saint Vincent and the Grenadines
- South Africa
- Suriname^{S}
- Taiwan^{F}
- Timor-Leste^{S}
- Vietnam^{S}

_{F - e-Visas shall be issued free of charge.}
_{S - May only apply for a single entry e-Visa on which they can stay for up to 30 days per 180-day period.}

=== Conditional e-Visa ===
Citizens of the following countries and territories holding ordinary passports may apply for an e-Visa if they meet the conditions listed below. Citizens whose applications are approved shall be issued with electronic visas for single entry and for duration of stay up to 30 days. Visitors are not permitted to work and recourse to public funds.

- Afghanistan
- Algeria
- Bangladesh
- Cape Verde
- Egypt
- Equatorial Guinea
- India
- Iraq^{F}
- Libya
- Pakistan
- Palestine
- Philippines
- Senegal
- Sri Lanka
- Yemen

_{F - eVisas shall be issued free of charge.}

Conditions

All nationalities,

- must hold a valid visa or residence permit issued by any Schengen Area member state, Ireland, the United Kingdom or the United States. Electronic visas and electronic residence permits are not accepted.
- must travel by air and with Pegasus Airlines or Turkish Airlines, which have protocols with the Turkish Ministry of Foreign Affairs. Citizens of Egypt may also travel with AJet, Egyptair, or Air Cairo.
  Citizens of Afghanistan, Algeria, Bangladesh, India, Iraq, Libya, Pakistan, the Philippines, and Sri Lanka are exempted from this requirement.
- must hold a return ticket, a hotel reservation, and adequate financial means (50 EUR per day).
- must have a medical insurance that covers their trip.

Additional requirements for certain nationalities:

- Citizens of Algeria must be aged below 18 or above 35 years old.

== Visa types ==
There are several types of visas issued by Turkey:

=== Visitor visas ===
- Touristic visit
- Business meeting/Commerce
- Conference/Seminar/Meeting
- Festival/Fair/Exhibition
- Sportive activity
- Cultural artistic activity
- Official visit
- Transit visas
  - Single transit
  - Double transit
- Visit to the Turkish Republic of Northern Cyprus (Note: Applications for this type of visa are processed on behalf of the Turkish Republic of Northern Cyprus where a Turkish Cypriot representation is absent but also for transit purposes.)

=== Official visas ===
- Assigned for duty
- Courier

=== Student visas ===
- Internship visa
- Internship ERASMUS
- Internship AIESEC
- Turkish language course purpose
- Course purpose
- Education purpose
- Education in the Turkish Republic of Northern Cyprus (Note: Applications for this type of visa are processed on behalf of the Turkish Republic of Northern Cyprus where a Turkish Cypriot representation is absent.)

=== Work visas ===
- Employment purpose/Special employment purpose
- Assigned lecturers/academics
- Assigned sportsperson
- Assigned artists
- Assigned free zone workers
- Assigned journalists
- Montage and repairman purposes

=== Other visas ===
- Archaeological excavation, exploration purpose
- Documentary purpose
- Tour operator representative
- Medical treatment purpose
- Accompaniment purpose
- Family unification purpose
- Freight visa
- Seafarer visa
- Digital nomad visa (Note: Citizens of Austria, Belarus, Belgium, Bulgaria, Canada, Croatia, Czech Republic, Denmark, Estonia, Finland, France, Germany, Greece, Hungary, Iceland, Ireland, Italy, Latvia, Liechtenstein, Lithuania, Luxembourg, Malta, the Netherlands, Norway, Poland, Portugal, Romania, Russia, Slovakia, Slovenia, Spain, Sweden, Switzerland, Ukraine, the United Kingdom, and the United States are eligible to apply for this type of visa.)

== Transit visa ==
=== Visa nationals ===
Visa nationals are citizens who need a visa to enter and transit through Turkey.
All visa nationals are required a visa for landside transit; and some visa nationals are required a visa also for airside transit depending on their final destination.

=== Airside transit ===
In general, a passenger who transits through one single airport in Turkey while remaining airside in the international transit area less than one day will not require a visa (transit privilege). This only applies if the transfer is possible without leaving the international transit area, which depends on the connecting flight and airport layout.

==== Bound for the Turkish Republic of Northern Cyprus ====
On 15 August 2023, airport transit visa requirements were re-introduced. Citizens of the following countries and territories are required to hold a double airport transit visa (ATV) when transiting through any airport in Turkey when they are bound for the Turkish Republic of Northern Cyprus. Transit visas must be obtained from Turkish diplomatic mission responsible for the applicant’s area of residency:

- Afghanistan
- Bangladesh
- Benin
- Burkina Faso
- Burundi
- Cambodia
- Cameroon
- Cape Verde
- Central African Republic
- Chad
- Republic of the Congo
- DR Congo
- Djibouti
- Eritrea
- Ethiopia
- Eswatini
- Gambia
- Ghana
- Guinea
- Guinea-Bissau
- Ivory Coast
- Kiribati
- Laos
- Lesotho
- Liberia
- Libya
- Madagascar
- Malawi
- Mali
- Mozambique
- Myanmar
- Namibia
- Nepal
- Niger
- Nigeria
- North Korea
- Pakistan
- Rwanda
- Samoa
- São Tomé and Príncipe
- Senegal
- Sierra Leone
- Somalia
- South Sudan
- Sri Lanka
- Sudan
- Suriname
- Syria
- Tanzania
- Togo
- Tonga
- Tuvalu
- Uganda
- Vietnam
- Zambia
- Zimbabwe

==== Bound for South America ====
On 15 April 2024, further airport transit visa requirements were introduced. Citizens of the following countries are required to hold an airport transit visa (ATV) when transiting through any airport in Turkey when they are bound for Mexico, Panama, Colombia, or Venezuela. Airport transit visa may be applied and granted electronically.

- Afghanistan
- Burkina Faso
- Cameroon
- Chad
- Guinea
- India
- Nepal
- Mauritania
- Somalia
- Yemen

== Visa required in advance ==
Türkiye Cumhuriyeti Vize
- Owner: Turkish Foreign Office
- Website: www.konsolosluk.gov.tr

Citizens of the following countries and territories are not eligible for any of the “Visa Free Access” or “Electronic Visa” schemes. Therefore they have to obtain the appropriate type of visa for their intended visits in advance at a Turkish diplomatic mission unless they qualify for any of the “Conditional Visa Free Access” or “Conditional Electronic Visa” schemes:

- Afghanistan
- Algeria
- Angola
- Bangladesh
- Benin
- Bhutan
- Botswana
- Burkina Faso
- Burundi
- Cambodia
- Cameroon
- Cape Verde
- Central African Republic
- Chad
- Comoros
- Cuba
- Republic of the Congo
- DR Congo
- Dominica
- Djibouti
- Egypt
- Eritrea
- Eswatini
- Ethiopia
- Equatorial Guinea
- Gabon
- Gambia
- Ghana
- Guinea
- Guinea-Bissau
- Guyana
- India
- Iraq
- Ivory Coast
- Kenya
- Kiribati
- Laos
- Lesotho
- Liberia
- Libya
- Madagascar
- Malawi
- Mali
- Marshall Islands
- Mauritania
- Micronesia
- Mozambique
- Myanmar
- Nauru
- Nepal
- Niger
- Nigeria
- North Korea
- Pakistan
- Palau
- Palestine
- Papua New Guinea
- Philippines
- Rwanda
- Saint Kitts and Nevis
- Samoa
- São Tomé and Príncipe
- Senegal
- Sierra Leone
- Solomon Islands
- Somalia
- South Sudan
- Sri Lanka
- Sudan
- Syria
- Tajikistan
- Tanzania
- Togo
- Tonga
- Turkmenistan
- Tuvalu
- Uganda
- United Kingdom:
  - British Overseas Territories citizens
  - British Overseas citizens
  - British protected persons
  - British subjects
- Vanuatu
- Yemen
- Zambia
- Zimbabwe

In addition, holders of People's Republic of China Travel Document, Hong Kong Document of Identity for Visa Purposes or Macao Special Administrative Region Travel Permit must obtain a visa in advance regardless of their nationality.

== Means of subsistence ==
In addition to general requirements, Turkey also set entry conditions for foreign nationals called the "reference amounts required for the crossing of the external border" regarding means of subsistence during their stay. The set amount is 50 Euro per person per day.

== Visitor statistics ==
Turkey issued 16,199,968 electronic visas between April 2013 and 1 January 2017. The acceptance rate was 87.79% as 18,452,733 applications were filed in this period. Most visas were issued to nationals of the United Kingdom (4.6 million), Iraq (2 million) and the Netherlands (1.8 million).

Most visitors arriving in Turkey were from the following countries of nationality:

Country	2025	2024	2023	2022	2021	2020	2019	2018	2017	2016	2015	2014	2013	2012	2011	2010
Russia	6,903,981	6,710,198	6,313,675	5,232,611	4,694,422	2,128,758	7,017,657	5,964,613	4,715,438	866,256	3,649,003	4,479,049	4,269,306	3,599,925	3,468,214	3,107,043
Germany	6,745,190	6,620,612	6,193,259	5,679,194	3,085,215	1,118,932	5,027,472	4,512,360	3,584,653	3,890,074	5,580,792	5,250,036	5,041,323	5,028,745	4,826,315	4,385,263
United Kingdom	4,270,036	4,433,782	3,800,922	3,370,739	392,746	820,709	2,562,064	2,254,871	1,658,715	1,711,481	2,512,139	2,600,360	2,509,357	2,456,519	2,582,054	2,673,605
Iran	3,050,195	3,277,852	2,504,494	2,331,076	1,153,092	385,762	2,102,890	2,001,744	2,501,948	1,665,160	1,700,385	1,590,664	1,196,801	1,186,343	1,879,304	1,885,097
Bulgaria	2,808,357	2,918,581	2,893,092	2,882,512	1,402,795	1,242,961	2,713,464	2,386,885	1,852,867	1,690,766	1,821,480	1,693,591	1,582,912	1,492,073	1,491,561	1,433,970
Poland	1,914,958	1,866,986	1,539,123	1,135,903	585,076	145,908	880,839	646,365	296,120	205,701	500,779	510,569	423,129	428,440	486,319	428,275
United States	1,584,725	1,442,191	1,334,337	1,013,478	371,759	148,937	578,074	448,327	329,257	459,493	798,787	784,917	785,971	771,837	757,143	642,768
Georgia	1,327,884	1,466,188	1,633,977	1,514,813	291,852	410,501	1,995,254	2,069,392	2,438,730	2,206,266	1,911,832	1,755,289	1,769,447	1,404,882	1,152,661	1,112,193
Netherlands	1,275,577	1,303,262	1,232,220	1,244,756	645,601	271,526	1,117,290	1,013,642	799,006	906,336	1,232,487	1,303,730	1,312,466	1,273,593	1,222,823	1,073,064
Romania	1,174,607	1,173,358	990,005	886,555	496,178	269,076	763,320	641,484	423,868	357,473	441,097	426,585	395,214	385,055	390,248	355,144
France	1,100,603	1,088,380	1,031,824	986,090	621,493	311,708	875,957	731,379	578,524	555,151	847,259	1,037,152	1,046,010	1,032,565	1,140,459	928,376
Iraq	1,031,257	968,834	1,051,721	1,208,895	836,624	387,587	1,374,896	1,172,896	896,876	420,831	1,094,144	857,246	730,639	533,149	369,033	280,328
Ukraine	1,026,603	941,614	839,729	675,467	2,060,008	997,652	1,547,996	1,386,934	1,284,735	1,045,043	706,551	657,051	756,187	634,663	602,404	568,227
Azerbaijan	927,067	956,178	855,445	683,834	470,618	236,797	901,723	858,506	765,514	606,223	602,488	657,684	630,754	593,238	578,685	486,381
Saudi Arabia	921,726	869,453	820,683	497,914	10,083	67,490	564,816	747,233	651,170	530,410	450,674	341,786	234,220	175,467	116,711	84,934
Italy	810,998	719,668	602,176	420,661	116,806	72,619	377,011	284,195	205,788	213,227	507,897	697,360	731,784	714,041	752,238	671,060
Kazakhstan	762,747	863,542	826,319	712,136	366,076	137,213	455,724	426,916	402,830	240,188	423,744	437,971	425,773	380,046	315,907	247,784
Uzbekistan	649,719	569,818	470,644	419,673	272,604	102,598	252,138	241,235	195,745	134,330	143,331	143,354	129,292	105,976	85,011	68,124
Greece	621,595	707,133	686,480	569,795	157,723	136,305	836,882	686,891	623,705	593,150	755,414	830,841	703,168	669,823	702,017	670,297
Belgium	613,176	625,263	596,355	596,173	339,529	138,729	557,435	511,559	419,998	413,614	617,406	660,857	651,596	608,071	585,860	543,003
Austria	563,035	548,794	496,482	454,638	284,095	112,126	401,475	353,628	287,746	310,946	486,044	512,339	518,273	505,560	528,966	500,321
Spain	452,790	382,896	324,690	298,165	104,848	54,381	257,342	178,018	106,757	106,582	236,063	283,926	290,422	278,164	300,084	321,325
China	425,348	409,733	248,119	89,515	33,641	40,264	426,344	394,109	247,277	167,570	313,704	199,746	138,876	114,582	96,701	77,142
Switzerland	414,635	406,357	390,044	382,835	219,591	127,643	311,107	269,649	206,479	215,194	380,338	394,458	379,344	354,461	328,825	271,139
Sweden	406,422	397,201	364,984	415,696	192,872	93,703	444,285	384,397	289,134	320,580	624,649	667,551	692,186	617,811	571,917	447,270
Czech Republic	403,517	410,280	384,158	295,454	89,734	15,642	311,359	228,251	126,567	87,328	212,464	226,189	217,254	223,986	223,369	174,426
Algeria	343,592	324,042	292,505	210,478	48,827	50,121	295,512	288,207	213,333	176,233	171,873	160,052	118,189	104,489	84,844	67,954
Moldova	340,685	329,796	288,377	274,257	192,441	109,137	198,867	194,268	171,538	140,117	149,800	132,338	111,915	108,032	101,124	96,196
Denmark	336,097	345,198	319,835	356,127	111,499	44,694	335,877	326,278	269,026	329,618	408,841	408,287	402,818	391,312	369,867	314,446
Belarus	323,441	334,796	309,216	239,966	220,932	106,426	258,419	245,254	229,229	113,793	204,355	223,975	200,659	138,007	123,607	152,421
Canada	321,271	302,728	248,868	197,416	72,034	34,210	139,164	108,272	81,196	106,285	187,615	190,116	199,497	182,252	191,903	152,556
Serbia	318,512	342,002	311,738	357,787	238,852	129,284	282,347	225,312	146,852	110,594	178,997	189,396	169,988	157,568	137,934	113,465
Lithuania	306,952	285,026	277,810	251,619	114,227	14,194	229,704	199,371	134,264	109,749	112,654	106,469	90,180	69,520	76,036	71,992
Northern Cyprus	293,277	261,608	200,905	171,691	65,882	57,601	255,986	256,343	245,858	222,839	233,278	227,612	216,881	211,828	203,272	191,993
Jordan	281,071	301,641	384,680	494,629	326,633	93,750	474,874	406,469	277,729	203,179	162,866	131,329	102,871	102,154	94,914	96,562
Slovakia	267,778	274,047	235,303	196,462	37,963	8,648	207,108	157,003	97,967	61,477	151,514	136,899	127,455	126,974	122,088	91,765
Hungary	267,017	252,066	222,327	165,842	76,257	16,563	149,523	123,448	79,899	64,737	140,197	119,977	97,074	94,409	103,918	90,944
India	250,751	330,985	274,159	231,579	52,651	44,707	230,131	147,127	86,996	79,316	131,869	119,503	95,014	90,934	73,731	63,406
Lebanon	245,292	261,713	257,781	272,844	191,768	89,337	376,721	338,837	237,476	191,642	197,552	161,274	143,629	144,491	137,110	134,554
North Macedonia	242,520	246,626	251,066	266,184	182,045	115,483	222,862	209,519	172,851	146,008	167,428	156,138	140,793	137,579	130,648	115,541
Syria	232,859	257,324	384,958	370,877	404,064	211,914	571,976	477,439	404,203	291,754	847,275	1,176,490	1,252,826	730,039	974,054	899,494
Morocco	228,863	236,764	262,124	251,708	121,333	67,775	234,264	176,538	114,155	87,660	109,775	89,562	82,579	77,884	68,645	57,447
South Korea	226,434	206,931	159,039	99,869	15,206	36,636	212,970	159,354	120,622	106,904	228,694	248,910	187,040	159,084	149,943	123,315
Egypt	220,911	231,097	187,053	227,850	124,483	68,936	177,655	148,943	100,971	94,871	100,040	108,762	107,437	112,025	79,665	61,560
Ireland	220,021	195,899	163,165	136,608	36,947	26,176	96,886	71,221	50,102	54,221	101,379	105,001	112,665	110,863	118,620	111,065
Australia	219,696	205,874	192,770	118,847	15,674	15,109	120,837	96,488	77,153	97,626	225,762	200,730	190,457	164,899	156,009	131,685
Norway	211,552	222,994	203,325	191,789	54,633	25,100	208,330	161,789	116,180	156,215	282,210	326,292	412,870	406,879	375,502	299,405
Kuwait	209,921	264,440	363,070	480,123	246,249	120,221	374,191	298,620	255,644	179,938	174,486	133,128	88,238	65,167	41,617	27,281
Kosovo	209,671	209,853	174,681	193,823	145,931	70,462	152,048	139,500	116,049	100,022	97,818	86,272	78,825	70,156	56,411	46,228
Indonesia	207,080	202,456	178,800	152,995	49,319	39,690	127,149	119,337	85,031	47,232	56,867	59,486	57,385	56,113	40,282	24,349
Turkmenistan	199,988	153,688	120,928	45,249	18,979	43,236	297,706	252,911	230,881	165,762	174,330	180,395	148,709	135,168	137,476	114,390
Kyrgyzstan	199,280	184,174	169,906	147,487	102,840	52,142	121,364	114,926	104,911	88,877	88,369	81,941	64,905	42,866	41,197	35,665
Libya	192,126	220,497	194,351	220,179	197,983	107,251	259,243	188,312	99,395	72,014	234,762	267,501	264,266	213,890	53,562	60,917
Bosnia and Herzegovina	187,015	197,388	177,893	200,698	131,347	61,651	144,445	120,480	90,378	66,177	85,434	83,258	72,086	61,851	56,522	47,361
Japan	161,103	134,697	78,782	30,610	7,153	19,122	103,320	81,931	49,323	44,695	104,847	170,550	174,150	203,592	188,312	195,404
Tunisia	160,583	182,053	176,547	206,714	126,970	57,563	172,587	142,372	111,627	100,185	102,341	100,612	91,683	86,595	63,176	57,855
Albania	159,240	159,828	142,482	145,032	89,748	49,667	134,869	125,935	103,593	83,029	80,032	76,273	65,113	59,565	53,141	49,954
Pakistan	145,935	135,653	140,388	173,621	90,681	51,326	130,736	113,579	77,464	52,023	59,700	48,420	34,170	28,394	26,735	22,540
Mexico	139,411	142,963	155,155	114,267	34,705	12,775	66,557	36,737	19,632	20,958	45,902	42,663	36,617	31,576	29,606	22,908
Latvia	136,128	124,732	117,936	97,240	44,760	9,392	86,051	65,868	46,536	34,861	60,485	58,981	55,058	45,725	45,074	39,102
Philippines	127,064	129,071	120,347	97,954	55,397	48,440	139,126	95,068	63,244	59,015	83,515	69,229	59,734	65,272	51,610	31,658
Finland	125,834	123,414	117,123	117,281	32,809	15,003	135,192	128,860	97,112	122,185	213,803	228,138	219,044	195,083	186,562	143,204
Portugal	122,992	112,371	92,901	74,812	26,379	12,893	54,130	39,948	26,727	27,015	56,312	52,851	45,928	46,606	52,319	53,373
Israel	120,960	85,949	765,776	843,028	225,238	129,677	569,368	443,732	380,415	293,988	224,568	188,608	164,917	83,740	79,140	109,559
Brazil	119,501	120,201	106,717	84,582	17,788	22,722	101,164	78,691	49,754	42,530	85,473	91,627	113,433	88,903	89,442	65,246
Estonia	114,600	103,956	96,227	93,209	47,597	5,113	77,041	61,707	48,024	35,549	63,363	55,649	48,537	35,459	34,921	35,136
Malaysia	109,379	93,132	95,444	89,766	9,618	17,892	114,214	95,591	61,166	49,255	69,616	69,968	55,139	41,169	36,222	32,458
United Arab Emirates	101,460	99,992	120,819	146,438	52,587	3,772	37,500	43,292	49,360	38,315	51,600	53,736	52,424	48,071	35,579	30,480
Colombia	89,098	72,376	69,257	77,863	30,094	10,601	70,974	56,031	29,650	19,416	26,046	23,378	21,979	12,987	9,853	7,129
Taiwan	84,403	75,833	49,890	11,341	2,290	13,118	107,592	98,097	61,318	46,035	40,029	38,509	31,019	21,569	19,636	17,820
Croatia	78,844	77,003	66,948	61,327	29,464	16,566	56,465	44,188	23,630	21,346	38,598	45,297	44,058	47,144	41,959	33,563
Oman	76,051	86,661	95,895	130,160	61,058	14,294	88,378	53,230	25,234	13,891	18,787	14,283	8,956	7,959	5,998	5,408
Argentina	73,456	56,784	48,383	41,708	6,992	7,228	64,483	68,668	48,280	62,394	82,977	44,407	46,729	28,559	27,136	22,255
South Africa	70,698	70,231	67,647	71,636	6,088	12,251	74,652	53,544	34,487	29,316	47,679	43,049	44,798	40,771	34,394	27,177
Afghanistan	62,840	61,425	63,708	57,241	56,300	30,020	68,681	56,543	48,668	50,197	31,983	22,599	19,704	15,373	16,395	12,511
Slovenia	57,047	58,884	53,600	48,622	18,580	8,108	50,414	40,716	25,105	18,863	39,734	41,799	37,692	39,899	41,870	38,597
Bahrain	53,445	64,472	64,771	98,147	62,730	17,852	90,299	77,075	59,442	41,505	32,476	24,305	16,230	13,342	9,712	9,375
Qatar	50,794	57,813	70,090	92,439	83,831	31,956	108,496	96,327	48,764	32,681	35,832	29,743	18,630	13,971	7,661	6,043
Thailand	50,708	47,362	39,051	29,814	6,687	8,163	62,192	54,098	30,721	12,483	22,125	26,219	20,783	12,211	11,067	9,282
State of Palestine	49,751	49,015	73,430	97,011	64,073	17,181	72,760	56,816	32,339	19,353	16,218	11,435	7,971	6,327	5,447	4,685
Stateless (Haymatlos)	47,755	52,572	68,908	89,322	62,423	29,681	96,424	77,689	54,296	38,447	54,434	45,466	35,501	31,736	26,495	22,897
New Zealand	40,641	35,631	31,007	15,448	2,746	2,879	20,912	16,174	11,362	15,287	36,915	32,933	30,667	28,278	26,709	24,636
Singapore	40,197	39,134	38,932	30,602	2,951	4,912	34,930	28,382	17,561	15,962	26,892	29,449	22,403	22,206	20,957	18,994
Chile	33,581	24,746	25,713	17,333	3,815	3,320	18,509	14,609	8,645	10,421	24,307	17,451	15,905	12,765	11,964	8,183
Mongolia	32,611	36,148	36,162	43,764	12,883	6,314	17,910	15,876	13,174	10,929	11,231	10,723	10,179	8,154	5,357	4,776
Montenegro	32,248	34,274	29,844	29,417	20,812	11,441	27,639	24,183	19,555	16,709	19,768	20,423	18,838	16,559	13,793	11,610
Yemen	30,203	32,017	35,911	34,599	21,856	13,354	41,673	39,545	28,491	25,325	24,237	26,033	17,354	11,826	8,066	6,344
Armenia	29,879	31,587	31,950	36,445	10,178	9,309	66,882	51,880	48,320	39,063	48,522	67,198	73,365	70,956	72,393	69,323
Bangladesh	29,558	27,519	23,651	24,335	8,226	5,634	20,605	17,932	11,346	8,951	12,212	12,706	8,856	6,652	6,168	2,190
Venezuela	29,436	27,451	22,753	18,395	11,446	3,473	11,738	9,246	6,956	5,035	6,435	6,975	11,271	9,600	8,557	6,769
Peru	29,122	25,207	19,620	13,487	3,642	1,889	11,430	8,674	5,085	4,667	7,281	5,733	4,393	2,952	2,697	2,016
Hong Kong	26,436	23,849	17,642	5,435	1,043	4,053	30,092	18,683	6,994	6,399	19,074	20,217	12,650	13,138	10,666	6,442
Tajikistan	22,560	32,785	78,185	74,101	41,440	16,972	44,155	40,879	30,532	24,768	31,917	34,678	27,174	22,823	16,822	17,737
Nigeria	22,488	26,937	26,125	38,566	26,508	17,493	39,885	28,510	25,760	25,264	27,711	28,387	22,869	19,897	14,564	9,172
Ethiopia	20,723	23,267	26,382	25,619	45,230	14,356	20,714	9,137	6,078	5,408	5,095	4,480	3,488	2,826	1,912	1,479
Luxembourg	19,309	17,228	15,633	13,186	8,499	2,228	10,957	7,716	4,922	4,831	12,764	15,310	15,733	14,034	13,286	11,262
Ecuador	17,215	15,418	15,770	15,807	4,833	1,558	8,416	8,423	5,548	4,323	6,791	5,093	4,780	4,433	3,892	2,704
Malta	16,096	15,239	14,356	16,321	7,163	3,258	8,739	8,287	5,523	5,849	9,210	7,430	6,769	6,397	5,974	3,361
Sudan	15,416	15,093	19,913	43,192	25,965	10,555	17,863	15,661	12,162	10,562	11,434	10,714	9,319	8,161	7,458	6,634
Cyprus	15,271	16,762	14,232	11,254	2,471	2,207	12,355	10,516	10,201	10,342	12,967	15,943	14,265	18,924	16,749	15,421
Mauritius	14,099	13,258	11,859	13,836	2,831	2,306	10,714	6,137	5,485	2,499	4,078	4,046	2,648	4,088	3,255	2,117
Vietnam	13,965	10,711	7,474	6,247	1,811	1,819	13,194	9,622	4,947	3,293	6,399	5,679	4,618	3,674	5,266	3,428
Sri Lanka	12,995	11,483	9,182	6,630	2,149	1,602	7,530	5,100	3,219	2,405	3,519	3,141	3,268	2,431	1,769	1,408
Nepal	12,847	10,051	6,663	5,382	2,310	2,446	8,271	7,788	5,904	3,425	3,795	1,880	1,155	1,277	915	634
Senegal	12,335	13,751	14,390	16,282	12,641	5,376	10,290	7,546	6,170	5,705	5,483	5,133	4,811	5,650	5,579	4,755
Eritrea	10,944	10,783	11,607	11,032	5,409	2,225	10,004	6,741	2,982	1,447	1,608	1,237	584	546	382	561
Total	52,775,055	52,629,283	49,209,180	44,564,395	24,712,266	12,734,213	45,058,286	39,488,401	32,410,034	25,352,213	36,244,632	36,837,900	34,910,098	31,782,832	31,456,076	28,632,204

== Gallery ==
=== Historic visas ===
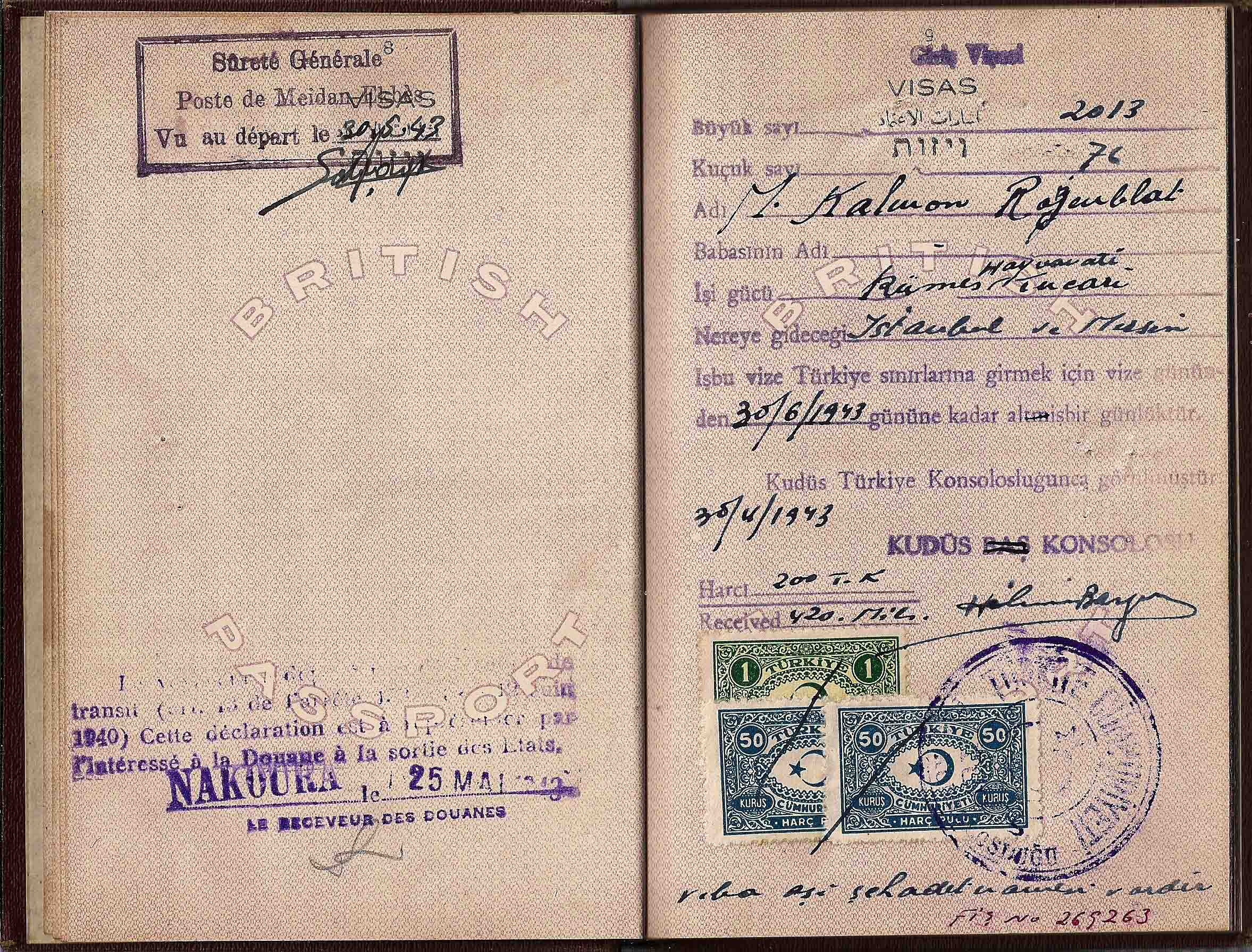
1943 Turkish visa issued to a representative of the Rescue Committee of the Jewish Agency holding British Mandatory Palestine passport in Jerusalem

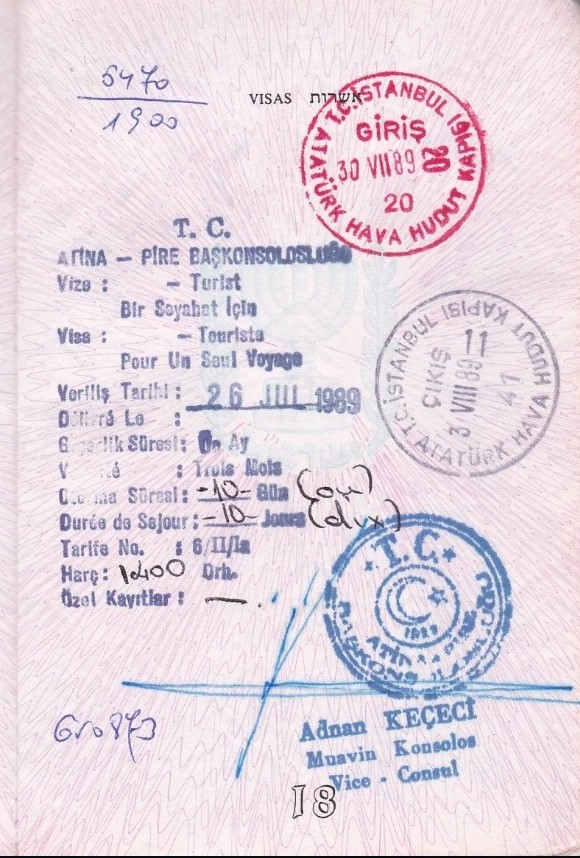
1989 Turkish visa issued to an Israeli passport holder in Athens

== See also ==
- Visa requirements for Turkish citizens
- Visa policy of Northern Cyprus
- Visa policy of the Schengen Area
