= Northern Cypriot passport =

Passport of Northern Cyprus

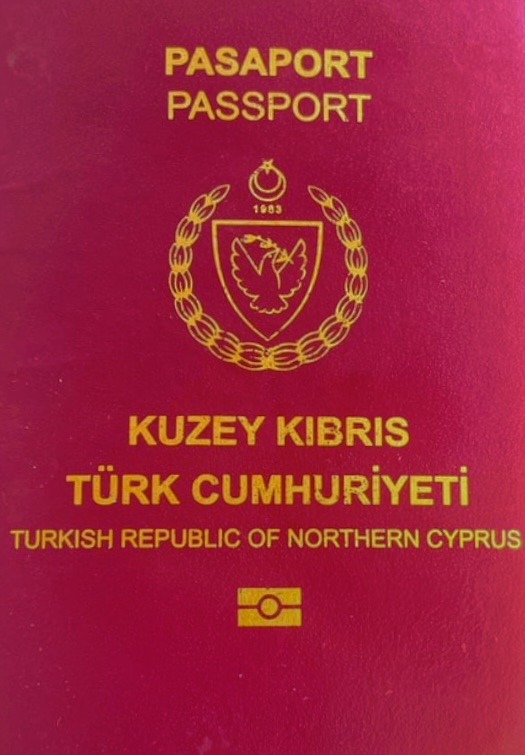
- The front cover of the new 2024 version of the passport with the Coat of arms of Northern Cyprus.
- Type: Passport
- Issued by: Ministry of Interior
- Purpose: Identification
- Eligibility: Northern Cyprus citizenship
- Expiration: 5 years
- Cost: Standard (32 pages): ₺2635 (€60)

Northern Cypriot passports are issued to citizens of the self-declared state of the Turkish Republic of Northern Cyprus for the purpose of international travel.

The Northern Cypriot passport is officially only valid in Turkey. Turkish Cypriots are also eligible for a Turkish passport and a Cypriot passport.

== See also ==
- Cypriot passport
- Northern Cypriot identity card
- Visa requirements for Northern Cypriot citizens
- Foreign relations of Northern Cyprus
- List of diplomatic missions of Northern Cyprus
- List of diplomatic missions in Northern Cyprus
- Passports in Europe
