= Northern Cypriot identity card =

Identity document of Northern Cyprus

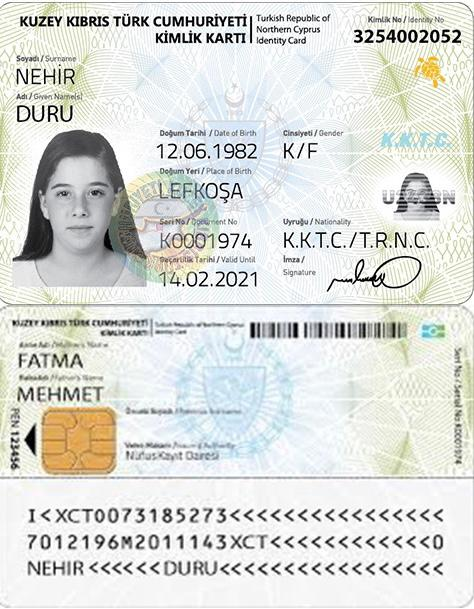
- Front & Rear example of a Northern Cypriot Identity Card
- Type: Compulsory identity document, optional replacement for passport in the listed countries/territories
- Issued by: North Cyprus
- Purpose: Identification
- Valid in: North Cyprus; Akrotiri and Dhekelia; Cyprus^{1}; Turkey^1 : Land border only.
- Eligibility: Northern Cyprus citizenship
- Expiration: Adult - 10 years; Child - 5 years
- Cost: As of 2025; Adult - ₺800; Child above 11 years - ₺800

Northern Cypriot identity card are issued by the government of the de facto state of the Turkish Republic of Northern Cyprus for the purpose of identification. It can be used as a travel document to enter Turkey, the Sovereign Base Areas of Akrotiri and Dhekelia, and Cyprus (only at the land border with North Cyprus).

== Physical appearance ==
The coat of arms of North Cyprus is situated in the center on both sides of the card. On the top of the front side, the name of the Turkish Republic of Northern Cyprus' is printed in English, and Turkish (Kuzey Kıbrıs Türk Cumhuriyeti). The card is valid for 10 years (5 years for children) from the time of issue.

=== Identity information page ===
Turkish Republic of Northern Cyprus identity cards include the following data:

Front

- Photo of card holder
- Identity number
- Given names
- Surname
- Date of birth
- Place of birth
- Sex
- Nationality
- Document number
- Document expiry date
- Signature of holder

Back

- Mother’s name
- Father's name
- Maiden name
- Issuer

The identity cards also contain a biometric chip and machine readable zone on the reverse side.

== See also ==
- Northern Cypriot passport
- Driving licence in Northern Cyprus
- Cypriot identity card
- National identity cards in the European Economic Area
