= Visa policy of Northern Cyprus =

Policy on permits required to enter Northern Cyprus

Most visitors to Northern Cyprus are issued a free visa on arrival. However, citizens of certain countries must obtain an e-Visa.

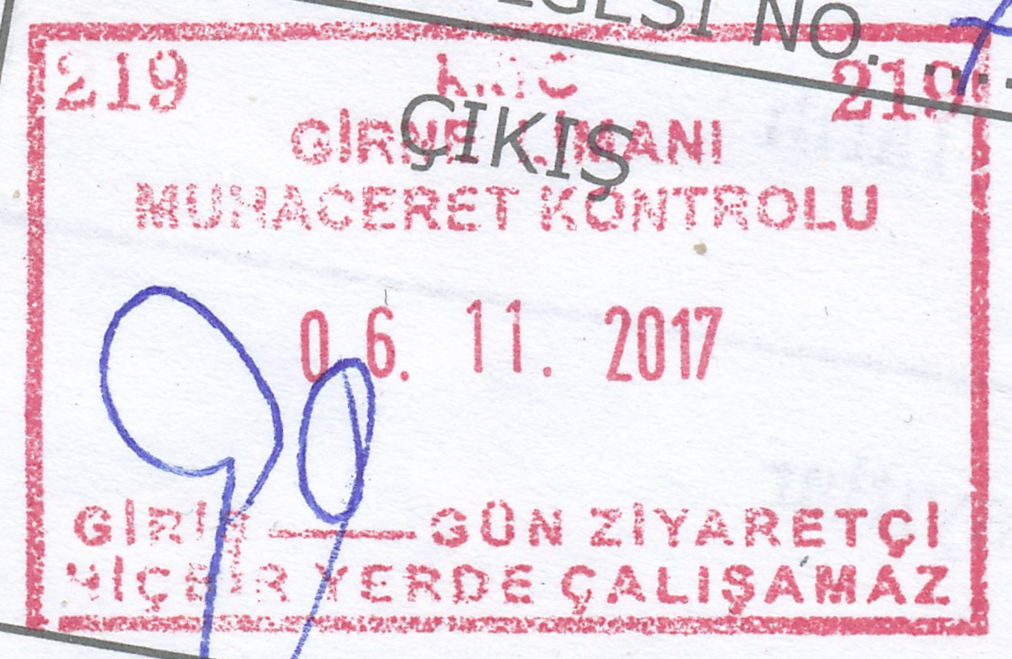
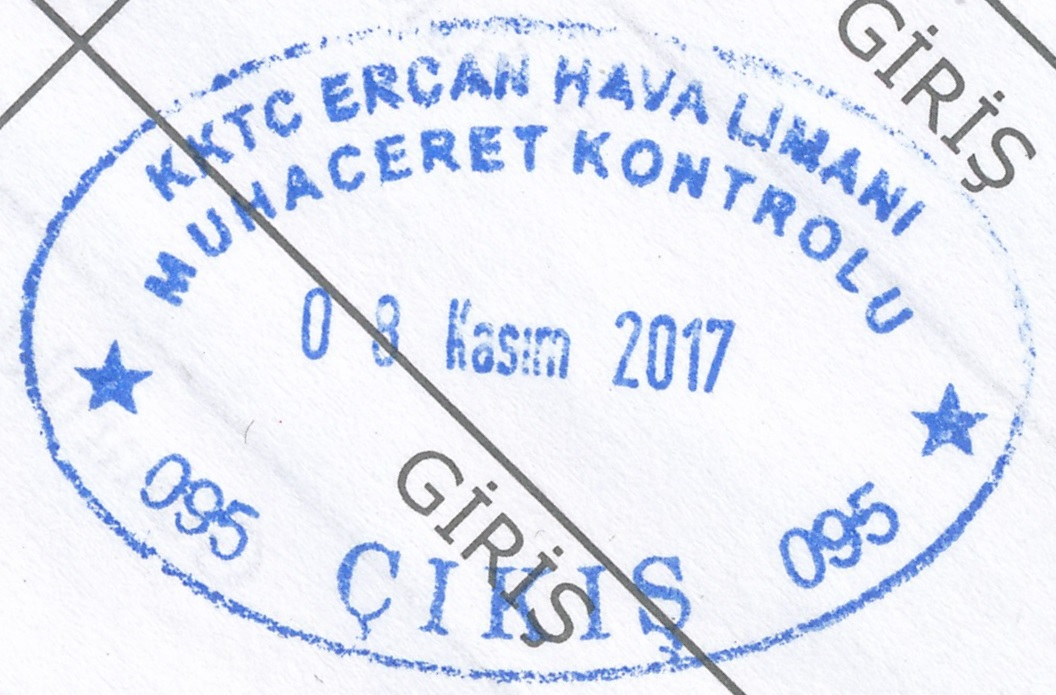
Entry and exit stamps

Citizens of all European Union member states, Iceland, Liechtenstein, Norway, Switzerland and Turkey may enter Northern Cyprus with an ID card (including an Irish passport card) in lieu of a passport (i.e. without obtaining a work or residence permit).

== Visa policy map ==
Visa policy of Turkish Republic of Northern Cyprus The Turkish Republic of Northern Cyprus Free visa on arrival eVisa

== Visa on arrival ==
=== Free visa on arrival ===
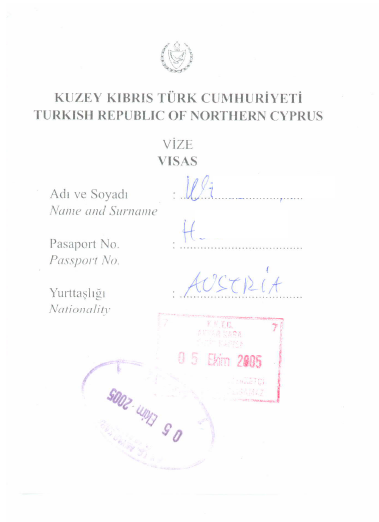
Turkish Cypriot visa issued at the border of Akyar and Dhekelia

Citizens of all countries and territories (except Armenia, Nigeria and Syria) may obtain a free visa on arrival at the designated ports and border crossings for a maximum stay of 90 days within any 180-day period.

All foreign citizens who wish to stay in Northern Cyprus for more than 90 days, are required to obtain a residence permit. Foreign citizens who exceed the period of stay without a residence permit will be issued a visa penalty fine (100.23 Turkish lira for each day) that has to be paid on a future re-entry.

Citizens of the following countries and territories may obtain a free visa on arrival but they are required to hold a double airport transit visa (ATV) when transiting through any airport in Turkey when they are bound for the Turkish Republic of Northern Cyprus. Transit visas must be obtained from Turkish diplomatic mission responsible for the applicant’s area of residency:

- Afghanistan
- Bangladesh
- Benin
- Burkina Faso
- Burundi
- Cambodia
- Cameroon
- Cape Verde
- Central African Republic
- Chad
- Republic of the Congo
- DR Congo
- Eritrea
- Djibouti
- Ethiopia
- Gambia
- Ghana
- Guinea
- Guinea-Bissau
- Ivory Coast
- Kiribati
- Laos
- Lesotho
- Liberia
- Libya
- Madagascar
- Malawi
- Mali
- Mozambique
- Myanmar
- Namibia
- Nepal
- Niger
- North Korea
- Pakistan
- Rwanda
- Samoa
- Sao Tome and Principe
- Senegal
- Sierra Leone
- Somalia
- South Sudan
- Sri Lanka
- Sudan
- Suriname
- Swaziland
- Tanzania
- Togo
- Tonga
- Tuvalu
- Uganda
- Vietnam
- Zambia
- Zimbabwe

== Electronic visa (e-Visa) ==
Citizens of the following countries must obtain an e-Visa:

- Armenia
- Nigeria^{1}
- Syria^{1}

_{1 - Must also hold a double airport transit visa (ATV) issued by the Republic of Turkey .}

== See also ==
- Visa requirements for Northern Cypriot citizens
- Visa policy of Turkey
- Visa policy of the Schengen Area
- Visa policy of Akrotiri and Dhekelia
