= Foreign relations of Northern Cyprus =

Northern Cyprus is recognised only by Turkey, a country which facilitates many of its contacts with the international community. After it was occupied by Turkey, Northern Cyprus' relations with the rest of the world were further complicated by a series of United Nations resolutions which declared its independence legally invalid. A 2004 UN Referendum on settling the Cyprus dispute was accepted by the Turkish Cypriots but rejected by the Greek Cypriots. After that, the European Union declared its intentions to assist in reducing the economic isolation of Northern Cyprus and began giving aid to the territory. However, due to pressure from Greece and the Republic of Cyprus, this aid coming from EU funds cannot be used on Greek Cypriot land and property nor on public bodies. As a result, these funds can be used only on 29% of people on the island of Cyprus (those under the de facto control of Northern Cyprus).

There is an embargo against the entity in many areas, decisively affecting its attempts at international contacts and representation.

== International recognition ==
Turkey is the only country which recognises Northern Cyprus.

Rumours that Pakistan and Bangladesh briefly recognised Northern Cyprus right after its declaration of independence have persisted. At the time, Bangladesh denied that it recognised Northern Cyprus. However, a 2017 study of British diplomatic cables concluded that though Pakistan never recognised Northern Cyprus, Bangladesh seemingly extended recognition in 1983 "but quickly regretted the decision and so decided to pretend that it had not." Pakistan and Bangladesh were reportedly persuaded to withhold recognition under the threat that they would risk losing US foreign aid.

In 2005, Yahya Jammeh, then President of the Gambia, said that his country was ready to recognise the independence of Northern Cyprus. The Cypriot government protested and The Gambia did not recognise the TRNC.

The Nakhichivan Autonomous Republic (an exclave of Azerbaijan) had issued a resolution in the mid-1990s recognising the TRNC's independence, but Azerbaijan itself has yet refrained to officially support this decision due to the Nagorno-Karabakh issue. Azerbaijan is sympathetic to the TRNC, but the Republic of Cyprus could recognise Nagorno-Karabakh if Azerbaijan officially recognised the TRNC. High-level contacts between Azerbaijan and Northern Cyprus increased to the point that Faiz Sucuoğlu, TRNC's Prime Minister expressed his hope in 2022 that Azerbaijan would recognise his country. No recognition has yet been forthcoming.

TRNC Foreign Minister Tahsin Ertuğruloğlu made a call to the members of OIC on 23 September 2022, at a coordination meeting of the Organisation's ministers of foreign affairs, at New York, to recognise his country, only a couple of days after a similar call by the President of Turkey to the international community at the 77th UNGA.

Northern Cyprus is recognised by the Commonwealth of Nations as a part of the Republic of Cyprus, not as an independent country.

In July 2024, at the summit of the Organization of Turkic States the Azerbaijani President, Ilham Aliyev congratulated the President of Northern Cyprus, Ersin Tatar for the 50 years since the Turkish invasion of Cyprus and mentioned that the participation in the Turkic summit is a crucial step towards the recognition of Northern Cyprus.

In September 2026, at the 81st UNGA, Turkish President Recep Tayyip Erdoğan called on the international community to recognize Northern Cyprus and establish political, diplomatic and economic relations with it. He also called for recognition of the "sovereign equality and equal international status" of Turkish Cypriots. Cypriot President Nikos Christodoulides responded in his own UNGA address. Referring to Erdoğan's invocation of international law, sovereignty, territorial integrity, occupation and refugees, Christodoulides said that, regarding Cyprus, Turkey was doing "exactly the opposite" and described this as "hypocrisy of the highest form." Christodoulides said that if Erdoğan wanted to invoke the UN Charter, he should first apply it, and noted that the UN-established settlement framework remains a bizonal, bicommunal federation (BBF) with political equality.

=== States that recognise Northern Cyprus ===
No.	Country	Date of recognition	Diplomatic relations	Relevant membership, further details
1	Turkey	15 November 1983	Yes	Northern Cyprus–Turkey relations

=== States that Formerly recognised Northern Cyprus ===
No.	Country	Date of recognition	Rescinded
1	Pakistan	15 November 1983	1983
2	Bangladesh	15 November 1983	1983

== Diplomatic representations ==
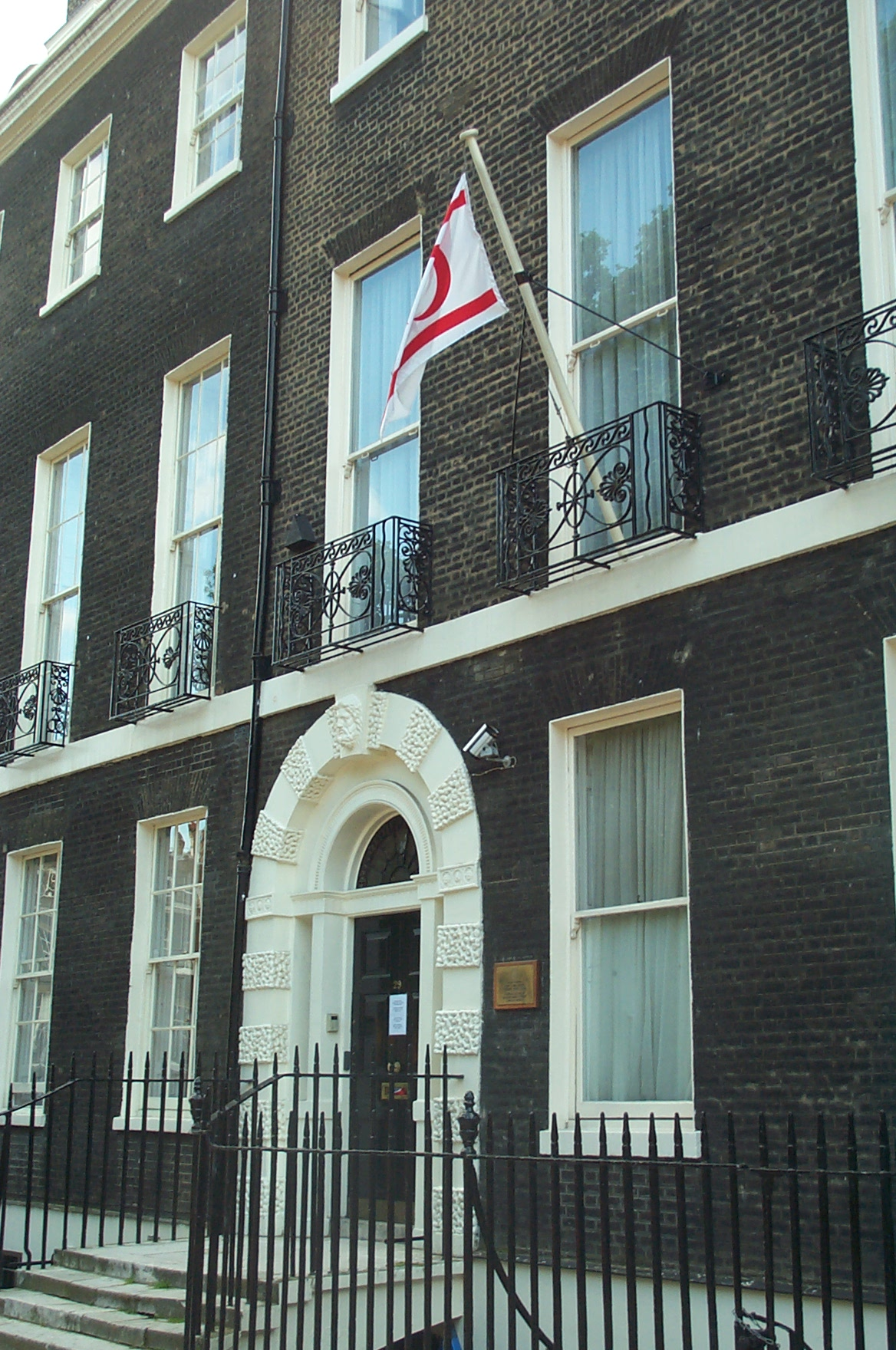
London office of the Turkish Republic of Northern Cyprus, Bedford Square.

Since the establishment of the TRNC in 1983, only Turkey maintains a resident embassy in Northern Cyprus, and opened a Consulate General in Famagusta in mid January 2023. The TRNC has an embassy in Ankara and consulates in several major cities of Turkey.

In various other countries, the TRNC has representative offices, some of which are unofficial. Turkey represents the TRNC's interests in countries without such offices. In North Nicosia (the Turkish Cypriot-administered northern half), both the British High Commissioner to Cyprus and the United States Ambassador to Cyprus have their formal residences, though since these residences had been in use since before 1963, it is not indicative of formal recognition of the TRNC by the United Kingdom or United States. In the same situation are the representative offices maintained by Australia, France, Germany, South Korea.

In May 2015, the EU Infopoint office that aims to bring the Turkish Cypriots closer to the EU, has been inaugurated in North Nicosia.

Honorary Representatives are also appointed by the TRNC in various other cities to represent the TRNC and to assist the primary TRNC Representative Offices.

United States, United Kingdom, Russia, Germany, France, Pakistan and Azerbaijan have representation offices in Northern Nicosia. As well, Northern Cyprus has a number of representations in other countries with various status.

== Foreign minister ==
The current Foreign Minister is Tahsin Ertuğruloğlu. He is holding this position for the fourth time, since 1983.

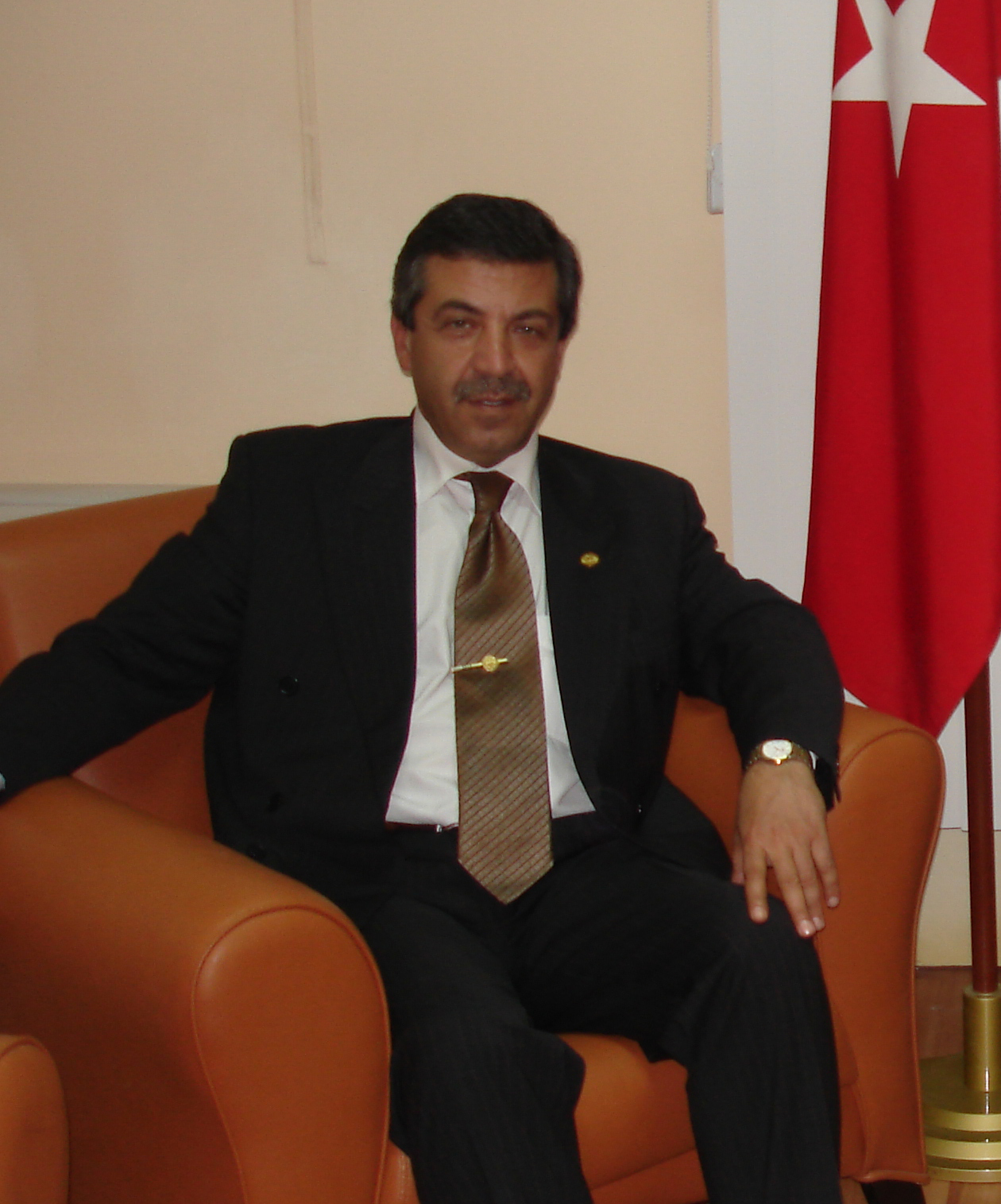
Tahsin Ertuğruloğlu

== Bilateral relations ==
=== Azerbaijan ===
Azerbaijan–Turkish Republic of Northern Cyprus locator

On 9 August 2022, Ilham Aliyev, the President of Azerbaijan met with TRNC President Ersin Tatar in Konya and regarded Northern Cyprus officially as the "Turkish Republic of Northern Cyprus". Ersin Tatar also visited Azerbaijan on 13–14 October 2023 and met with Aliyev again. In June 2024, Aliyev met with Tatar on the sidelines of the Organization of Turkish States (OTS) summit in Shusha, Azerbaijan, but did not extend official recognition. On 3 July 2025, Tatar visited Azerbaijan for the 17th Summit of the Economic Cooperation Organization (ECO) and met with Azerbaijani Prime Minister Ali Asadov.

=== Burkina Faso ===
On 27 September 2024, Foreign minister of Northern Cyprus, Tahsin Ertuğruloğlu and Foreign minister of Burkina Faso, Karamako Jean-Marie Traoré, met during margins of the meeting of the United Nations General Assembly.

=== Republic of Cyprus ===
After the Republic of Cyprus became a member of the European Union, the southern part of the island became part of the Customs Union of the EU. The Northern part of the island is excluded from the Customs Union. In spite of that, the Green Line regulations are intended to ease trade relations between Northern Cyprus and the EU.

The "identity cards" issued by the State of Northern Cyprus is a valid document accepted by Republic of Cyprus for border crossings between the north and the south.

=== Equatorial Guinea ===
In 2011 and 2012, the then President of Northern Cyprus Derviş Eroğlu and President of Equatorial Guinea Teodoro Obiang Nguema Mbasogo held meetings in New York, US.

=== France ===
In 2023, the president of Northern Cyprus, Ersin Tatar, strongly protested France's naval base in the southern part of the island of Cyprus which Northern Cyprus considers illegal.

On 10 December 2025, The Court of Aix-En-Provence rejected the Republic of Cyprus' extradition request of a Turkish Cypriot national with the reasoning that the European law does not apply in Northern Cyprus, and the courts of the Republic of Cyprus are not in a position to enforce laws in Northern Cyprus. On 18 December 2025, The French Public Prosecutor's Office rejected the Republic of Cyprus' appeal. On 21.01.2026, France's Court of Cassation (Cour de Cassation) rejected the Republic of Cyprus' appeal.

On 28 April 2026, TRNC Prime Minister Ünal Üstel condemned plans to deploy French soldiers to southern Cyprus, calling the move "extremely dangerous, provocative and unacceptable" and warning it could severely damage the island's peace and stability.

=== The Gambia ===
In 2022, the President of Northern Cyprus, Ersin Tatar, received the Vice President of The Gambia, Badara Alieu Joof, who invited President Tatar to The Gambia.

=== Germany ===
Although Germany does not maintain official relations with Northern Cyprus, it has wide-ranging contact with representatives of the Turkish Cypriots.

=== Greece ===
In 2014, the-then Turkish Cypriot negotiator Kudret Özersay and his delegation was received by the Secretary General of the Greek Foreign Ministry, Anastasios Mitsialis.

=== Guinea ===
In 2008, the minister of Economy, Finance and Planning of Guinea, Ousmane Doré, visited Northern Cyprus and met with Turgay Avcı, the then minister of Foreign Affairs of Northern Cyprus.

=== Israel ===
In 2008, Northern Cyprus announced plans to establish a trade representative office in Tel Aviv, Israel, with the involvement of Israeli lawyer and former government official Dov Weissglas. Israel, which does not recognize Northern Cyprus, stated that the office would have no official diplomatic status and would operate solely as a private commercial entity.

The office's establishment prompted diplomatic objections from the Republic of Cyprus in 2008. Israel maintained that the office would operate solely as a private commercial entity without diplomatic recognition or official status. In February 2009, Cyprus boycotted a tourism fair in Tel Aviv over the participation of a Northern Cypriot tourism company, despite Israeli restrictions on the display of Northern Cypriot national symbols.

The office subsequently operated in Tel Aviv and was listed by the Northern Cypriot Ministry of Foreign Affairs as an overseas representative office. It closed in 2014 after Israeli authorities declined to issue visas to its designated representatives. In January 2023, Turkish Deputy Foreign Minister Yasin Ekrem Serim stated that efforts were underway to reopen it.

=== Kosovo ===
On 18 February 2008, the President of the TRNC, Mehmet Ali Talat, congratulated the people of Kosovo on their new-found independence, in opposition to the Republic of Cyprus, which has not recognised Kosovo as an independent state. However, presidential spokesman Hasan Ercakica stated that the TRNC was not preparing to officially recognise Kosovo. In contrast, the Republic of Cyprus has rejected Kosovo's declaration of independence and, given the ICJ ruling that Kosovo's declaration of independence was not illegal, stating that Kosovo and Northern Cyprus were not analogous situations.

=== Kyrgyzstan ===
In 2008 Kyrgyzstan earthquake, Northern Cyprus helped Kyrgyzstan and granted tents, blankets, tons of food, construction materials (cement, covering slate, timber and bricks), power generators, wood stoves, and warm clothes. In 2016, a common Turkish Cypriot–Kyrgyz business cooperation forum was held in Kyrgyzstan.

=== Libya ===
On 30 October 2011, Libya and Northern Cyprus signed the Cooperation on Health Services Protocol. The protocol included to reserve 250 beds at the Near East University hospital in North Nicosia for the treatment of injured Libyans.

=== Malaysia ===
On 5 August 2023, Malaysia allowed the Turkish Republic of Northern Cyprus to open a trade office in Malaysia.

=== Pakistan ===
In February 2017, the president of Northern Cyprus, Mustafa Akıncı was received by the President of Pakistan, Mamnoon Hussain.

On 4 August 2023, the signing of a memorandum of understanding on higher education was agreed between Northern Cyprus and Pakistan.

On 8 November 2023, the President of TRNC, Ersin Tatar met with Pakistan's Prime Minister Anwaar ul Haq Kakar in Tashkent, during the XVI. ECO Summit.

=== Palestine ===
In July 2009, Palestinian President Mahmoud Abbas's visit to the Republic of Cyprus prompted a diplomatic dispute with Turkey over reports that Abbas had endorsed the Greek Cypriot position on the Cyprus problem. Turkey summoned Palestinian ambassador Nabil Maarouf, who denied the reports and stated that Palestine would refrain from involvement in the dispute. Abbas subsequently visited Ankara for talks with Turkish President Abdullah Gül and Prime Minister Recep Tayyip Erdoğan.

In August 2025, Palestinian community organizations in Turkey and Northern Cyprus established a joint representative body, affirming their allegiance to the Palestine Liberation Organization (PLO).

A further conference in October 2026 included representatives of the PLO and the Palestinian embassy in Turkey. Later that month, Northern Cyprus's foreign ministry expressed regret over Abbas's visit to the Republic of Cyprus, while reiterating its willingness to develop relations with the Palestinian leadership.

=== Russia ===
In February 2008, Vladimir V. Putin, the President of the Russian Federation, equated the Northern Cyprus situation with that resulting from a unilateral Kosovo declaration of independence, which he opposes, in order to point out European countries' double standards in their desire to recognise Kosovo region as an independent state.

On 2 September 2008, the Russian Ambassador to Turkey announced that if Turkey recognised the Georgian breakaway regions of South Ossetia and Abkhazia, Russia would recognise the TRNC as an independent country. Later, Russian Foreign Minister Sergei Lavrov rejected this variant.

In September 2023, Russia started consular services in Northern Cyprus.

=== Turkey ===
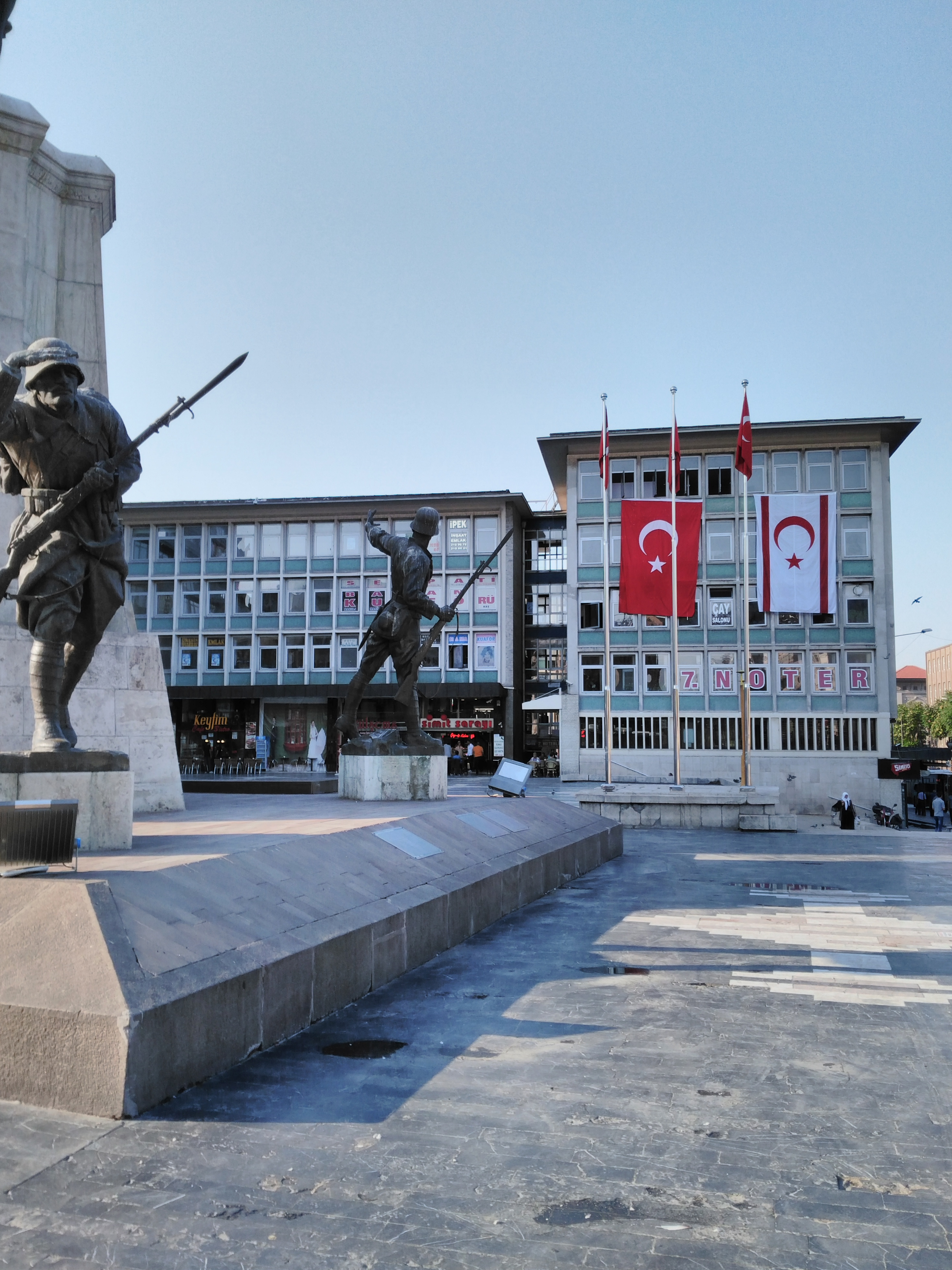
Northern Cypriot flag at Ulus Square in Ankara.

The TRNC fully supports Turkey's bid to join the European Union. As part of this bid, Turkey signed a protocol extending its customs union to the new EU members, including the Republic of Cyprus, which Turkey does not recognise. Turkey made sure this was not tantamount to recognition with the inclusion of a declaration, stipulating their continued policy of non-recognition of what they describe as the "Greek Cypriot administration of Southern Cyprus" until a settlement is reached. This declaration is not accepted by the EU which did not accept this statement as forming part of the acquis and expects Turkey to fully abide to its obligations against the Republic of Cyprus. The TRNC views any move by the EU to force Turkish recognition of the Republic of Cyprus as an effort to cut them off from their base of support.

On 21 September 2011, Turkey and Northern Cyprus signed the EEZ border agreement in New York.

=== United Kingdom ===
The UK maintains a dialogue with the Turkish Cypriot community, although still does not recognise Northern Cyprus.

On 3 February 2017, The United Kingdom's High Court stated "There was no duty in the United Kingdom law upon the Government to refrain from recognising Northern Cyprus. The United Nations itself works with Northern Cyprus law enforcement agencies and facilitates co-operation between the two parts of the island". and revealed that the co-operation between the United Kingdom police and law agencies in Northern Cyprus is legal.

Turkish Cypriot governmental officials declared that Northern Cyprus must be ready to Brexit since EU acquis will not be binding on the UK thereby the UK and Northern Cyprus can trade just as pre-1994 ECtHR ruling.

=== United States ===
The United States abstained in a vote in 1984 in the UN Security Council condemning "secessionist activities" on Cyprus. A Northern Cyprus Representative Office is located in Washington, D.C. The Representative Office in New York City is the de facto mission of the TRNC to the United Nations Organisation (as well as a de facto Consulate-General).

On 9 October 2014, the Federal Court of the United States (USA) stated that "the TRNC purportedly operates as a democratic republic with a president, prime minister, legislature and judiciary...The TRNC is NOT vulnerable to a lawsuit in Washington.".

Greek Cypriot Toumazou applied to the USA Court of Appeals. The USA Court of Appeals rejected Toumazou, too on 15.01.2016.

After the US Federal Court called and qualified TRNC as "Democratic Republic" and the USA Court of Appeals affirmed the decision, The United States Sectetary of State has started to describe the TRNC as the Area Administered by Turkish Cypriots.

On 28 September 2021, Minister of Foreign Affairs of Northern Cyprus, Tahsin Ertuğruloğlu had meetings with members of the House of Representatives of the US Congress, Congressman Peter Sessions and Congressman Steve Chabot, respectively.

On 3 August 2023, US Congressman and former chair of the National Republican Congressional Committee, Pete Sessions, visited Northern Cyprus. Sessions met with President Ersin Tatar; he visited the Turkish Cypriot parliament building where he was met by Parliamentary Speaker Zorlu Töre, and the Turkish Cypriot Chamber of Commerce.

== Membership in international organisations ==
In 1979, Northern Cyprus became an observer member of the Organisation of Islamic Cooperation under the title "Turkish Cypriot State". In 2017, Northern Cyprus was represented with its official name "Turkish Republic of Northern Cyprus" for the first time at an OIC conference in Saudi Arabia.

In 1994, the Turkish Republic of Northern Cyprus became an observer member of the International Organization of Turkic Culture (Türksoy).

In 2004, the Turkish Cypriot community was awarded "observer status" in the Parliamentary Assembly of the Council of Europe (PACE), as part of the Cypriot delegation. Since then, the two Turkish Cypriot representatives of PACE are elected in the Assembly of Northern Cyprus.

On 16 October 2012, Northern Cyprus became an observer member of the Economic Cooperation Organization under the title "Turkish Cypriot State". In 2017, Northern Cyprus was represented with its official name "Turkish Republic of Northern Cyprus" for the first time at an ECO conference in Pakistan.

In 2013, North Cyprus Red Crescent Society became an observer member of the International Federation of Red Cross and Red Crescent Societies.

In 2022, Northern Cyprus became an observer member of the Organization of Turkic States (OTS) with its official name "Turkish Republic of Northern Cyprus". The TRNC President, Ersin Tatar, participated at the Ankara Extraordinary Summit of the Organization on 17 March 2023. He also received the Secretary General of the OTS on 22 September 2023 at New York, during the 78th UNGA.

In April 2023, Northern Cyprus became an observer member of the Parliamentary Assembly of Turkic States (TURKPA) with its official name "Turkish Republic of Northern Cyprus".

In 2023, the TRNC also participated to the 146th Inter-Parliamentary Union (IPU) summit in Bahrain.

== See also ==
- List of diplomatic missions in Northern Cyprus
- List of diplomatic missions of Northern Cyprus
- Turkish Cypriot diaspora
- ELF Cup
