= List of diplomatic missions in Northern Cyprus =

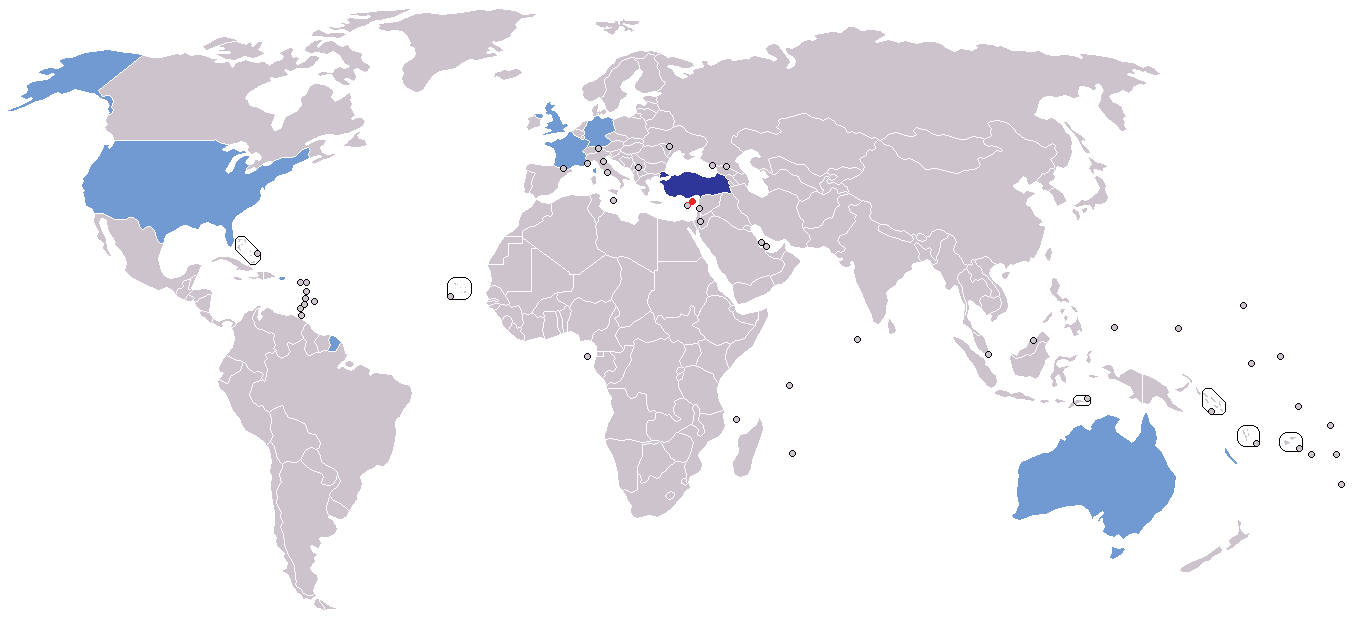
Map of diplomatic missions in Northern Cyprus (TRNC) TRNC States with embassy in TRNC States with representative office in TRNC

This is a list of diplomatic missions in Northern Cyprus (TRNC).

== Embassies ==
In Lefkoşa

- Turkey (Embassy)

== Consulates ==
In Gazimağusa

- Turkey (Consulate-General)

== Other offices ==
Foreign missions located in Lefkoşa:

- Australia (High Commission Office)
- Azerbaijan (Information Office)
- European Union (Programme Support Office, EUPSO)
- France (Cultural Office)
- Germany (Embassy Office)
- Italy (Embassy Office)
- Russia (Embassy Office)
- United Kingdom (High Commission Office)
- United States (Ambassadorship Office)

== See also ==
- Foreign relations of Northern Cyprus
- List of diplomatic missions of Northern Cyprus
