= Northern Cyprus–European Union relations =

European Union–Northern Cyprus relations
- European Union: Northern Cyprus

Diplomatic mission
- Program Support Office of the EU, North Nicosia: Representative Office of the TRNC, Brussels

Northern Cyprus–European Union relations are somewhat strained because the European Union (EU) does not recognise the self-declared Turkish Republic of Northern Cyprus.

== Legal situation ==
Due to the Cyprus dispute, TRNC is recognized only by the EU candidate state Turkey. All other countries recognise the Republic of Cyprus, an EU member state, as the only legitimate government for the whole island. However the Republic of Cyprus de facto controls only the south of the island while the TRNC government controls the north.

Due to this dispute, Northern Cyprus is de jure part of the EU by virtue of de jure being part of the Republic of Cyprus. It was hoped that the accession of the south in 2004 would provide the catalyst for unification so that a federal state of Greek Cypriots and Turkish Cypriots could join the EU on 1 May 2004. In the end, Turkish Cypriots supported reunification, also because it would allow them to join the EU. However, on 24 April 2004, the unification plan was voted down by the Greek Cypriots and Cyprus joined the EU as the Republic of Cyprus.

Cyprus' Treaty of Accession 2003 included Protocol No 10 on Cyprus (OJ L 236, 23.09.2003, p. 955), Art. 1.1 of which states: "The application of the acquis shall be suspended in those areas of the Republic of Cyprus in which the Government of the Republic of Cyprus does not exercise effective control."

== Status in the EU ==
As of 2018, the EU recognises the north as being outside the control of the Greek Cypriot–led government of the Republic and hence is temporarily exempt from EU legislation. The euro also does not officially circulate in the north (although it does have widespread usage) and the Schengen agreement is not in effect in Cyprus due to complications in security at the external border to the north. The free movement of goods, capital, services and people is also not in effect. Turkish Cypriots are considered citizens of the European Union as the EU considers them Cypriot citizens, merely living in a part of Cyprus outside of the control of the Republic of Cyprus.

However, seats in the European Parliament are allocated based on the population of both north and south Cyprus together. Turkish Cypriots that hold citizenship of the Republic of Cyprus are allowed to vote and be candidates.

Naturalised citizens of TRNC or foreigners carrying a passport stamped by TRNC authorities may be refused entry by the Republic of Cyprus or Greece, although after the accession of the Republic of Cyprus to the EU such restrictions have been eased following confidence-building measures between Athens and Ankara and the partial opening of the UN-controlled line by TRNC authorities. The Republic of Cyprus also allows passage across the Green Line from the part of Nicosia that it controls, as well as a few other selected crossing points, since TRNC does not leave entry stamps in the passport for such visits. Since May 2004, some tourists have taken to flying to the Republic of Cyprus directly, then crossing the green line to holiday in northern Cyprus.

=== Euro ===
The northern part of Cyprus is legally part of the EU, but law is suspended due to it being under the control of the Northern Cypriot Government since the 1974 invasion and occupation of the country, which the EU does not recognise. The North uses the Turkish lira instead of the euro, although the euro circulates alongside the lira and other currencies. On the resolution of the Cyprus dispute and the reunification of the island, the euro would become the official currency of the occupied area as well. If Northern Cyprus adopted the euro, it would be the first time the euro replaced the use of another currency that hasn't ceased to exist after euro adoption. Euro adoption would help to address inflation in the North by bringing in price stability. Cypriot euro coins already bear the name of Cyprus in both Greek and Turkish, displaying representations of natural and ancient Cypriot history.

== Trade ==
In wake of the April 2004 referendum on unification, and the support of the Turkish Cypriot community for the plan, the European Union made pledges towards ending the isolation of northern Cyprus. The proposal for trade between the EU and the Turkish Cypriots was never implemented due to opposition from the Greek Cypriots, who argue that trade would amount to indirect recognition of the TRNC. Proposals to open up trade were discussed by Parliament again in 2010, but still opposed by the Republic of Cyprus.

== Aid programme ==
The EU has helped the Turkish Cypriot community prepare to implement EU law in the future, as a final reunification settlement would mean the application of EU law throughout Cyprus. Through the Financial Aid Regulation, the EU has funded infrastructure projects, civil society and has provided training on the EU body of laws. To manage the interaction with the EU, the Turkish Cypriots have introduced a series of institutions, such as the EU Coordination office.

== Green Line Regulation ==
The Green Line Regulation has been implemented to regulate movement through the 'Green Line', the border that separates Greek Cypriot and Turkish Cypriot areas, and to help the economic development of the Turkish Cypriots. In order to avoid recognising the TRNC by implication, The European Commission has dealt with the Turkish Cypriot Chamber of Commerce rather than ministerial authorities, which would have been the norm. This offered the chamber an important role in the relations with the EU.

== Northern Cyprus's foreign relations with EU member states ==
- Austria
- Belgium
- Bulgaria
- Croatia
- Cyprus
- Czech Republic
- Denmark
- Estonia
- Finland
- France
- Germany
- Greece
- Hungary
- (Republic of Ireland) Ireland
- Italy
- Latvia
- Lithuania
- Luxembourg
- Malta
- Netherlands
- Poland
- Portugal
- Romania
- Slovakia
- Slovenia
- Spain
- Sweden

== See also ==
- Cyprus dispute
- Annan Plan
- Politics of Northern Cyprus
- Turkish invasion of Cyprus
- Apostolides v Orams
