= List of diplomatic missions of Northern Cyprus =

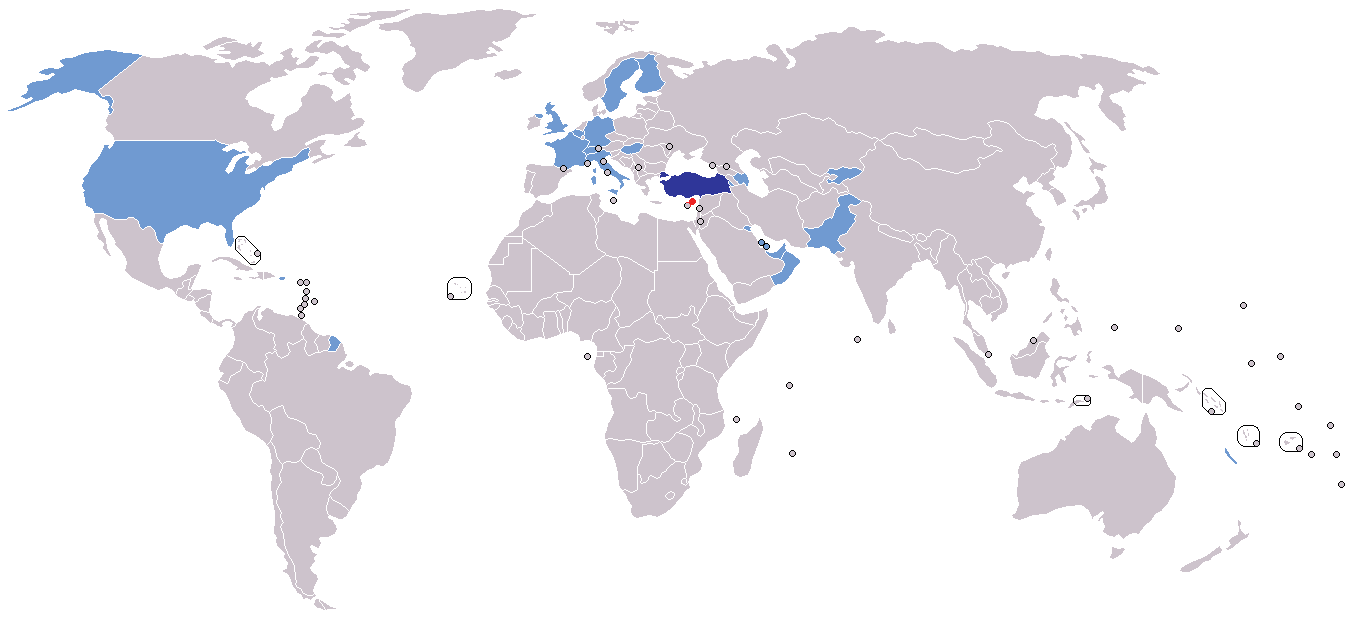
Map of diplomatic missions of Northern Cyprus (TRNC) TRNC TRNC embassy TRNC representative office

This is a list of diplomatic missions of Northern Cyprus. The Turkish Republic of Northern Cyprus (TRNC) is recognized only by Türkiye (formerly known as Turkey), and consequently has only one embassy with de jure recognition, along with six consulates-general. However this has not prevented the TRNC authorities from opening representative offices elsewhere. Legally the two representative offices in the United States of America hold the status of commercial entities and their staff do not have Diplomatic Visas.

== Americas ==
| Host country | Host city | Mission | Head | |
| Host country | Host city | Mission | Name | Title |
|---|---|---|---|---|
| United States | Washington, D.C. | Representative Office | Mustafa Lakadamyalı | Representative |
| United States | New York City | Representative Office | Mehmet Dânâ | Representative |

== Asia ==
| Host country | Host city | Mission | Head | |
| Host country | Host city | Mission | Name | Title |
|---|---|---|---|---|
| Azerbaijan | Baku | Representative Office | Ufuk Turganer | Representative |
| Bahrain | Manama | Representative Office | Umut Koldaş | Representative |
| Kuwait | Kuwait City | Representative Office | Hilmi Akil | Representative |
| Kyrgyzstan | Bishkek | Economy & Tourism Office | Atınç Keskin | Representative |
| Oman | Muscat | Representative Office | Mustafa Tunç | Chief of Mission |
| Pakistan | Islamabad | Representative Office | Mehmet Davulcu | Representative |
| Qatar | Doha | Representative Office | Mustafa Güven | Representative |
| United Arab Emirates | Abu Dhabi | Representative Office | Zeliha Khashman | Representative |

== Europe ==
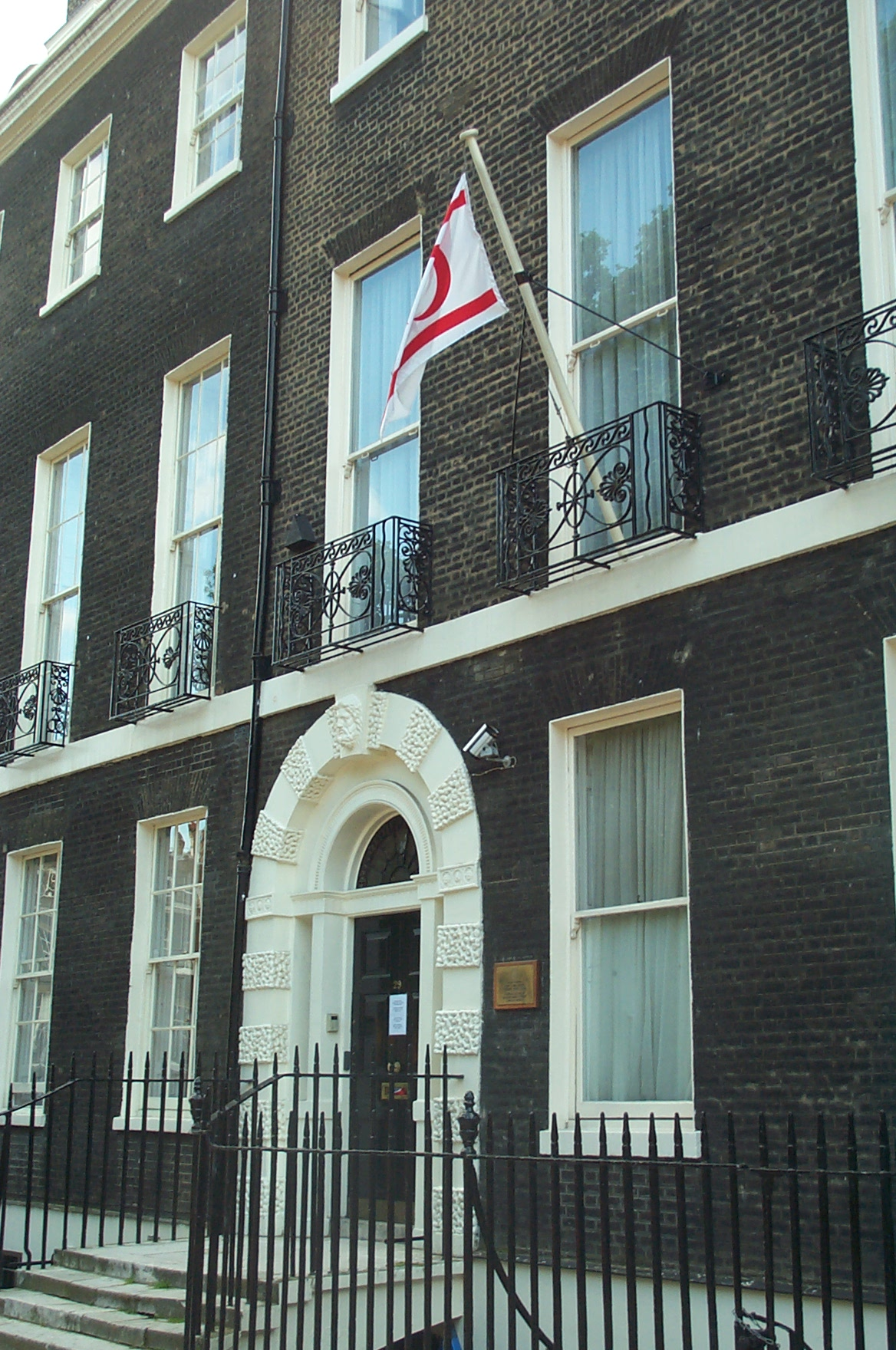
Representative Office in London, United Kingdom

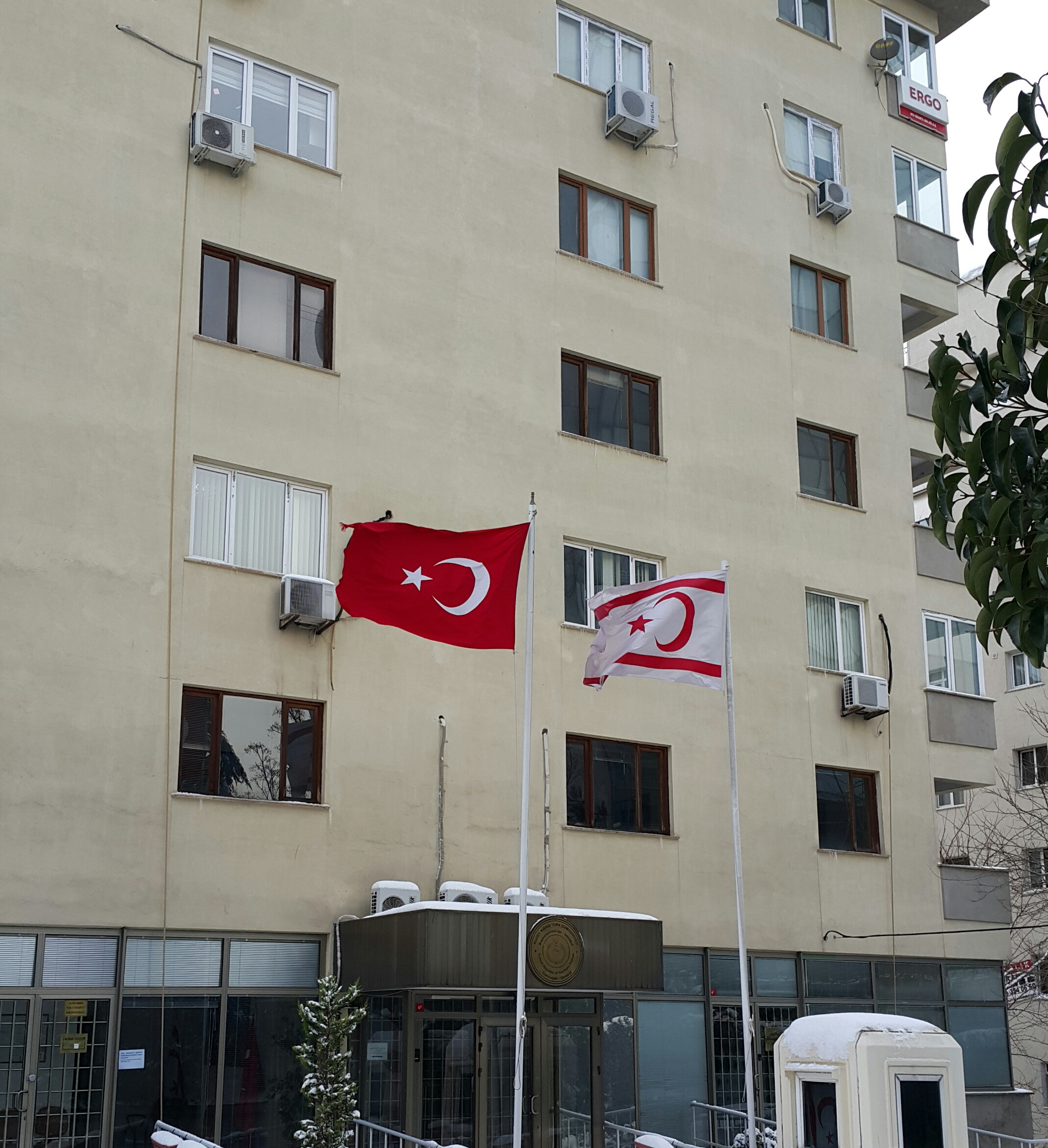
Consulate-General in Istanbul, Turkey

| Host country | Host city | Mission | Head | |
| Host country | Host city | Mission | Name | Title |
|---|---|---|---|---|
| Austria | Gaming | Representative Office | | Representative |
| Belgium | Brussels | Representative Office | Ayda Soylu | Representative |
| Finland | Helsinki | Representative Office | Sonat Altuğ | Chief of Mission |
| France | Strasbourg | Representative Office | Selda Çimen | Representative |
| Germany | Berlin | Representative Office | Beniz Uluer Kaymak | Representative |
| Hungary | Budapest | Representative Office | Özgür Ezel | Chief of Mission |
| Italy | Rome | Representative Office | Mustafa Davulcu | Representative |
| Sweden | Stockholm | Representative Office | Murat Soysal | Chief of Mission |
| Switzerland | Geneva | Representative Office | Gizem Alpman | Representative |
| Turkey | Ankara | Embassy | Kemal Köprülü | Ambassador |
| Turkey | Antalya | Consulate-General | Mustafa K. Beyazbayram | Consul-General |
| Turkey | Gaziantep | Consulate-General | Erhan Özkan | Consul-General |
| Turkey | Istanbul | Consulate-General | Seniha Birand Çınar | Consul-General |
| Turkey | İzmir | Consulate-General | Servet Başaran | Consul-General |
| Turkey | Mersin | Consulate-General | Zalihe Mendeli | Consul-General |
| Turkey | Trabzon | Consulate-General | Zalihe Erden | Consul-General |
| United Kingdom | London | Representative Office | Oya Tuncalı | Representative |

== Multilateral organisations ==
- New York City (TRNC Office to the United Nations)

== See also ==
- Foreign relations of Northern Cyprus
- List of diplomatic missions in Northern Cyprus
