= List of shipwrecks in 2026 =

The list of shipwrecks in 2026 includes ships sunk, foundered, grounded, or otherwise lost during 2026.

table of contents
2026
Jan	Feb	Mar	Apr
May	Jun	Jul	Aug
Sep	Oct	Nov	Dec
Unknown date

== January ==
=== 1 January ===
List of shipwrecks: 1 January 2026
Ship	State	Description
Chant du Loup	France	The fishing vessel fouled her prop with her net in the English Channel. She was taken under tow but her towline parted off the entrance to Dieppe, France, and she was driven onto the breakwater. The crew was rescued by a Dauphin helicopter (French Navy).
CSE Prosperity Express	Panama	The 168-metre (551.2 ft) 28,440-ton bulk carrier ran aground off Hualien, Taiwan after reporting main engine failure and severe weather conditions.
Taigang 13205	Taiwan	The 35-metre (114.8 ft) tugboat drifted aground off Hualien, Taiwan after becoming entangled in CSE Prosperity Express (Panama) tow lines while attempting to assist. The crew was rescued by a Black Hawk helicopter.
Unknown	Flag unknown	A boat carrying hundreds of migrants capsized overnight in The Gambia. Seven people were killed, 96 others were rescued and 97 were reported missing.

=== 2 January ===
List of shipwrecks: January 2026
Ship	State	Description
BTh 85945 TS	Vietnam	The fishing vessel was swamped and sunk by large waves at La Gi, Bình Thuận province, Vietnam, waves pushed her ashore, partially sunk. Three crew made it to shore, one drowned.

=== 3 January ===
List of shipwrecks: 3 January 2026
Ship	State	Description
Qendil	Oman	Russian invasion of Ukraine:The 249-metre (817 ft), 115,338-ton shadow fleet tanker was blown aground in the Aegean Sea (39°49′N 25°58′E) off Polente feneri, Bozcaada Island, Çanakkale, Turkey (she had been damaged in an attack by a Ukrainian drone on 19 December 2025 off Libya). She was refloated on 16 January and taken to Tuzla, Turkey, for repairs.
Unknown	Flag unknown	A fishing vessel was destroyed by fire in the Bay of Bengal while berthed at Nizampathnam Harbour, Bapatla, India.
Unknown	Nigeria	A passenger boat capsized in Yobe State, Nigeria. 26 people were killed, 13 others were rescued and 15 were reported missing.
White Line	Palau	The 75-metre (246 ft), 2,052-ton cargo vessel was blown aground in strong winds in the Sea of Marmara off Martaş, Tekirdağ, Turkey.

=== 4 January ===
List of shipwrecks: 4 January 2026
Ship	State	Description
Quynh Dam Ngu 08888 or "08888"	Flag unknown	The abandoned 46.42-metre (152.3 ft) fishing vessel was discovered by fishing vessel 309 (Vietnam) in the South China Sea and taken under tow. Her towline parted and she drifted ashore at Thuyet Diem 1, Ban Tuong Commune, Quảng Ngãi Province, Vietnam, or discovered already ashore.

=== 5 January ===
List of shipwrecks: 5 January 2026
Ship	State	Description
Arctic Sea	United States	The 41-meter (135 ft) 485-ton fishing vessel ran aground in the Bering Sea just off St. George Island, Alaska, in a gale with swells reported to between 10 and 20 feet (3.0 and 6.1 m) and wind gusts reaching up to 65 knots (120 km/h; 75 mph). The crew was taken off by a United States Coast Guard MH-60 helicopter.
Unknown	Flag unknown	A fishing vessel capsized in the Qiongzhou Strait off Xuwen, Zhanjiang, China. One crewman died, five others were rescued.

=== 7 January ===
List of shipwrecks: 7 January 2026
Ship	State	Description
Marinera	Russia	Crisis in Venezuela, United States oil blockade during Operation Southern Spear: The tanker was seized in the Atlantic Ocean 110 nautical miles (200 km) south of Iceland by USCGC Munro (United States Coast Guard). Marinera was reported to have been under escort by a Russian Navy submarine.
M. Sophia	Panama	Crisis in Venezuela, United States oil blockade during Operation Southern Spear: The tanker was seized in the Caribbean Sea by American forces. M. Sophia was on a voyage from a Venezuelan port to a Chinese port.
Unknown	Flag unknown	A fishing vessel was destroyed by fire in the South China Sea off Sri Gaya, Semporna, Malaysia.
Unknown	Flag unknown	A 4.6-ton fishing vessel sprung a leak and sank in the Sea of Japan off Samyang Beach, Jeju-do, South Korea.

=== 8 January ===
List of shipwrecks: 8 January 2026
Ship	State	Description
Basaran II	Turkey	The 14-metre (46 ft) antipollution vessel broke loose from her moorings and smashed into the breakwater and sank partially submerged in the Sea of Marmara at Tuzla, Turkey in a severe storm.
Don Igilio	Ecuador	The 63-metre (207 ft), 808-ton fishing vessel was destroyed by fire in the Pacific Ocean off the coast of Peru. Yolanda rescued all 25 crew.

=== 9 January ===
List of shipwrecks: 9 January 2026
Ship	State	Description
Miniu	Poland	The 67-metre (220 ft) self-propelled barge ran aground in Lake Jungfernsee near Potsdam, Germany. Still aground as of 12 January due to icy conditions.
Olina	Timor-Leste	Crisis in Venezuela, United States oil blockade during Operation Southern Spear: The tanker was seized in the Caribbean Sea off Trinidad by American forces.

=== 11 January ===
List of shipwrecks: 11 January 2026
Ship	State	Description
Cheng Xian Feng 168	Philippines	The 712-ton tanker ran aground in the Philippine Sea at Barangay Poblacion 1, Burgos, Surigao del Norte, Mindanao, Philippines, due to engine failure.
Texas Lady	United States	The fishing vessel ran aground in the Pacific Ocean at Paradise Point northwest of Port Orford, Oregon. She sustained too much damage for salvage. The fishing vessel will be pulled up on the beach and dismantled on site.
Unknown	Thailand	A speedboat collided with the fishing trawler Pichaisamut 1 (Thailand) and capsized off Koh Khai-Koh Phi Phi killing one of the 55 people on board and injuring 21 others.

=== 12 January ===
List of shipwrecks: 12 January 2026
Ship	State	Description
Silver Dorado	South Africa	The squid fishing vessel caught fire one nautical mile (1.9 km; 1.2 mi) offshore off Noordhoek, Gqeberha. She was abandoned and drifted ashore near Cape Recife. The fishing vessel Raka rescued four fishermen, the fishing vessel Maverick rescued four fishermen, and the fishing vessel Vulcan rescued one fisherman.
Unknown	Flag unknown	A fishing vessel capsized in the Yellow Sea at a seaweed farm near Tonggae Port, Pado-ri, Sowon-myeon, Taean-gun, South Korea. One crewman died and three others were rescued.

=== 13 January ===
List of shipwrecks: 13 January 2026
Ship	State	Description
Deep Sea MatDrill	Liberia	The 58-metre (190 ft) 5,131-ton jack-up drilling rig ran aground in the Gulf of Khambhat near Daman, India. Still aground as of 6 February.
Fener	Turkey	The 138-metre (453 ft), 4,515-ton cargo ship was beached to prevent sinking in the Mediterranean Sea approximately 5 miles (8.0 km) west of the northern entrance to the Suez Canal near Port Said after a breach in her hull.
Unknown	Mali	A ferry struck rocks and sank while trying to dock at Diré, Tombouctou Region, Mali. 38 people were killed and 23 others survived.

=== 14 January ===
List of shipwrecks: 14 January 2026
Ship	State	Description
Rona	Iran	The 113.98-metre (374.0 ft), 3,262-ton bulk carrier sprung a leak and sank in the Caspian Sea. All fourteen of her crew were rescued.
KH 90026 TS	Vietnam	The fishing vessel was reported missing in the South China Sea approximately 35 miles (56 km) off Bãi biển Đại Lãnh, Vietnam. The ship departed from Da Nang bound for gillnet fishing in gale force winds and high waves. As of 16 January, there had been no sightings of the ship or the crew of eight, though a floating gillnet had been seen near Phú Quốc.

=== 15 January ===
List of shipwrecks: 15 January 2026
Ship	State	Description
Santa Anna Maria	France	The 23-metre (75 ft) fishing vessel ran aground in the Bay of Biscay near Les Sables-d'Olonne, Pays de la Loire, France. All seven crew members were rescued unharmed but the ship will be scrapped.

=== 20 January ===
List of shipwrecks: 20 January 2026
Ship	State	Description
Fiorello and skiff	Ecuador	The fishing vessel went missing between Ecuador and the Galápagos Islands. Two crew in one of her skiffs heard an explosion and saw smoke, her other skiff disappeared. Survivors reported constant surveillance by US aircraft and the suspect vessel sunk by US airstrike.

=== 21 January ===
List of shipwrecks: 21 January 2026
Ship	State	Description
Acoa	United Kingdom	Cyclone Harry: The 24-metre (79 ft), 90-ton sailing yacht was blown ashore by the strong winds from Cyclone Harry with gusts up to 80 kilometres per hour (50 mph) in the Balearic Sea near Playa de Marica, Costa de Los Pinos, Mallorca, Spain.
Quantum	United States	The fishing vessel ran aground in Pasagshak Bay approximately 2 miles (3.2 km) offshore of Kodiak, Alaska and flooded. The two-man crew was rescued by a United States Coast Guard MH-60 Jayhawk helicopter.

=== 23 January ===
List of shipwrecks: 23 January 2026
Ship	State	Description
Devon Bay	Singapore	The 189.99-metre (623.3 ft), 31,756 GRT cargo vessel capsized and sank approximately 55 nautical miles (102 km) off Scarborough Shoal in the South China Sea. Two crew were killed, four were reported missing, and 17 were rescued.

=== 24 January ===
List of shipwrecks: 24 January 2026
Ship	State	Description
Cycloon	Netherlands	The 85-metre (279 ft), self-propelled barge ran aground on the River Rhine near Cologne, Germany, near the 681 kilometre mark allowing uncontrolled water ingress in the bow. To avoid sinking, the barge was later grounded on a nearby sandbank. Her cargo was lightered, she was refloated and towed for repairs.

=== 26 January ===
List of shipwrecks: 26 January 2026
Ship	State	Description
Trisha Kerstin 3	Philippines	The 48-metre (157 ft), 250-ton ro-ro passenger ferry sank in the Sulu Sea approximately one nautical mile (1.9 km) off Baluk-Baluk Island, Hadji Muhtamad, Basilan, Philippines. 316 people were rescued, 65 died, and 14-20 were reported missing.

=== 27 January ===
List of shipwrecks: 27 January 2026
Ship	State	Description
Unknown	Flag unknown	A 9.77-ton fishing vessel caught fire and burned out in the Sea of Japan approximately 42 nautical miles (78 km) east of Gampo, Gyeongju, North Gyeongsang, South Korea. A nearby fishing vessel responded and were able to rescue all six crew members from a life raft.

=== 28 January ===
List of shipwrecks: 28 January 2026
Ship	State	Description
Christina Debora	Barbados	The 39-metre (128 ft) fishing vessel ran aground under unknown circumstances in the Atlantic Ocean on Cobblers Reef along the western coast of Barbados. No details on the crew or their condition were released. The vessel is expected to be salvaged.

=== 29 January ===
List of shipwrecks: 29 January 2026
Ship	State	Description
Caspian Shiva	Iran	The 116-metre (381 ft), 3,344-ton cargo ship sprung a leak after a hull breach. She was beached to prevent sinking in the Caspian Sea approximately 7 kilometres (4.3 mi) from Makhachkala, Russia. Later refloated and proceeded to Makhachkala.

=== 30 January ===
List of shipwrecks: 30 January 2026
Ship	State	Description
Lily Jean	United States	The 22-meter (72 ft), 110-ton fishing vessel sank 25 miles (40 km) off Cape Ann, Massachusetts, United States. One person was killed and six others were reported missing.

=== 31 January ===
List of shipwrecks: 31 January 2026
Ship	State	Description
Black Cat	New Zealand	The 17-metre (56 ft) tourist catamaran was damaged on Archway Rock, she got off and made it into Akaroa Harbor, New Zealand where she was beached to prevent sinking, but broke up in heavy weather the next day, a Total loss. \
Chang Xin 198	China	The 53-metre (174 ft) bulk carrier capsized and sank due to cargo shift in heavy seas, including 2.5-metre (8 ft 2 in) waves and Force 7 gusts, off the coast of Hainan Island, China. Four crew were rescued and two others were reported missing.
Ethel von Brixham	Germany	The 28-metre (92 ft) 1890-built schooner stranded on rocks along a causeway near buoy 29 in the Elbe River near Cuxhaven, Germany. Still aground on 2 February while a decision was made on whether the schooner could be salvaged or declared a total loss. The crew was taken off by lifeboat Neuwerk. In attempts to lift her off, she broke in two.

== February ==
=== 1 February ===
List of shipwrecks: 1 February 2026
Ship	State	Description
BTh 85234 TS	Vietnam	The 10-metre (33 ft) fishing vessel was swamped by waves and sank in the South China Sea near the mouth of the La Gi River, Vietnam. Four crew were rescued but her master died.
NT 91241 TS	Vietnam	The fishing vessel sank in the South China Sea approximately 60 nautical miles (110 km) off the coast of Lâm Đồng province, Vietnam, in bad weather and heavy seas. All nine crew were rescued by BV 96976 TS (Vietnam).

=== 2 February ===
List of shipwrecks: 2 February 2026
Ship	State	Description
Intergod VII	Colombia	The tanker ran aground in the Playa Los Cocos area of Santa Marta, in the Magdalena Department, Colombia. Refloated on 4 February.

=== 3 February ===
List of shipwrecks: 3 February 2026
Ship	State	Description
NA 70670 TS	Vietnam	The fishing vessel sprung a leak, became waterlogged and partially sank in the Gulf of Tonkin off Nghệ An province, Vietnam. No injuries were reported.

=== 4 February ===
List of shipwrecks: 4 February 2026
Ship	State	Description
Unknown	South Korea	A 6.67-ton fishing vessel became waterlogged and partially sank while harvesting seaweed during large waves in the Sea of Japan off Sinjido, South Korea. The two crew members were rescued unharmed.

=== 7 February ===
List of shipwrecks: 7 February 2026
Ship	State	Description
Sealloyd Arc	Panama	The 4,339 GT cargo ship took a severe list and later sank three nautical miles (5.6 km; 3.5 mi) south of Laem Phromthep, Phuket, Thailand, on a voyage from Port Klang, Malaysia, to Chattogram, Bangladesh. All 16 crew were rescued.
Sfera	Marshall Islands	The 225-metre (738 ft) cargo ship ran aground in the Gulf of Finland near Seskar Island, Russia, and was still aground on 10 February.

=== 9 February ===
List of shipwrecks: 9 February 2026
Ship	State	Description
Defiant	United States	The 265-foot (81 m) fuel barge ran aground in Atlantic Ocean just outside San Juan, Puerto Rico just below the Castillo San Felipe del Morro after her towline snapped in rough seas. Still aground on 10 February.
ENE Vision	Dominican Republic	The 58-metre (190 ft) 1,809-ton cargo vessel ran aground at the entrance to Luperón Bay, Puerto Plata Province, Dominican Republic. Still aground on 10 February.
Unknown	South Korea	A 139-ton fishing vessel capsized and sank 20 nautical miles (37 km) east of Goemun, Yeosu City, Jeollanam Province, South Korea. Three crew were killed and seven others reported missing.

=== 11 February ===
List of shipwrecks: 11 February 2026
Ship	State	Description
Unknown	Sudan	A passenger ferry sank in the River Nile in the Shendi District, Sudan. 30 to 35 passengers were on board when it sank. Reports state that 6 or 7 passengers were rescued. Some 21 bodies were recovered.

=== 13 February ===
List of shipwrecks: 13 February 2026
Ship	State	Description
Unknown	unknown	A 32-ton fishing boat capsized off the coast of Jeju Island, South Korea, about 12 kilometers southwest of Pyoseon-myeon, Seogwipo. Of ten crew, her captain and 4 crew rescued, five reported missing.

=== 19 February ===
List of shipwrecks: 19 February 2026
Ship	State	Description
Keewaydin	United Kingdom	The 113-year-old 62GT sailing fishing ketch was destroyed by fire shortly before relaunching after a major restoration at Sailors' Creek, near Flushing, Cornwall, England.
Maresco Tres	Spain	The 10-metre (33 ft) fishing vessel was swamped and partially sank approximately 4 nautical miles (7.4 km) south of Cabo Silleiro, Baiona, Pontevedra, Spain, with just the tip of her bow above water. Last seen drifting into Portuguese waters. A Spanish Civil Guard helicopter rescued her two crewmen.

=== 20 February ===
List of shipwrecks: 20 February 2026
Ship	State	Description
Kosei Maru	Japan	The 16-ton fishing vessel broke in two and capsized in a collision with the cargo ship Shinsei Maru (Japan) off Toba, Mie, Japan. Eleven crew were rescued and two others died.

=== 21 February ===
List of shipwrecks: 21 February 2026
Ship	State	Description
Two unknown patrol vessels	Russian Navy	Russian invasion of Ukraine: Two Rubin-class border patrol ships were reported destroyed by Ukrainian drones in Crimea near Inkerman.
YB-0876H	Vietnam	The overloaded passenger vessel collided with stone carrier YB-0919H (Vietnam) in Thac Ba Lake causing it to capsize, resulting in six deaths. Six were rescued.

=== 22 February ===
List of shipwrecks: 22 February 2026
Ship	State	Description
Ste. Marie 1	Canada	The 19-metre (62 ft) passenger vessel sank on Lake Ontario at dock in Toronto, Ontario, Canada, with her superstructure partially above water. Expected to be refloated.

=== 28 February ===
List of shipwrecks: 28 February 2026
Ship	State	Description
Dura Bulk	Panama	The 88.85-metre (291.5 ft), 3,007-ton cargo ship sprung a leak and sank off Laayoune, Western Sahara. The crew was rescued.
IRIS Jamaran	Islamic Republic of Iran Navy	2026 Iran war: The Moudge-class frigate was sunk while in port at Chabahar Port during the initial phase of the war.
IRIS Makran	Islamic Republic of Iran Navy	2026 Iran war: The forward base ship, a converted oil tanker, was struck by missiles and set afire while moored at Chabahar Port.
IRIS Sahand	Islamic Republic of Iran Navy	2026 Iran war: The Moudge-class frigate was sunk at Bandar Abbas.
IRIS Shahid Bagheri	Islamic Republic of Iran Navy	2026 Iran war: The drone carrier was struck by American forces during the initial phase of the war. The ship was later confirmed as sunk.

== March ==
=== 1 March ===
List of shipwrecks: 1 March 2026
Ship	State	Description
IRIS Bayandor	Islamic Republic of Iran Navy	2026 Iran war: The Bayandor-class corvette was sunk at Konarak naval base.
Leo	Comoros	The 73.6-metre (241 ft) tugboat sprung a leak and sank approximately 80 nautical miles (150 km) south of Mossel Bay, South Africa. Of 18 crew, 12 rescued, one dead, and five others were reported missing.
MKD VYOM	Marshall Islands	2026 Iran war: The tanker was damaged after being struck off the coast of Oman, killing a crew member.
IRIS Naghdi	Islamic Republic of Iran Navy	2026 Iran war: The Bayandor-class corvette was sunk at Konarak naval base.
Skylight	Palau	Ship (IMO 9330020) in 2007, under the name Clipper Krystal 2026 Iran war: The tanker was attacked by Iranian forces and set afire in the Strait of Hormuz 5 nautical miles (9.3 km) off Masandam, Oman. Two people were killed, four others were injured and 14 others were rescued.

=== 2 March ===
List of shipwrecks: 2 March 2026
Ship	State	Description
Stena Imperative	United States	2026 Iran war: The tanker was struck by missiles in Bahrain Port and set afire. The fire was extinguished. Two port workers were killed.

=== 3 March ===
List of shipwrecks: 3 March 2026
Ship	State	Description
IRIS Fateh	Islamic Republic of Iran Navy	2026 Iran war: The Fateh-class submarine was sunk off Bandar Abbas.
Gold Oak	Panama	2026 Iran war: The bulk carrier was struck by missiles off Fujairah, United Arab Emirates.
Headcorn	United Kingdom	The 25-metre (82 ft) workboat sank in Orban Bay, Sound of Kerrera near Orban, Scotland (56°19′00″N 05°42′00″W). Raised 6 April.
Libre Trader	Panama	2026 Iran war: The tanker was damaged off Fujairah.
IRIS Shahid Sayyad Shirazi	Islamic Republic of Iran Navy	Shahid Sayyad Shirazi 2026 Iran war: The Shahid Soleimani-class corvette was struck by missiles and set afire off Bandar Abbas. It was claimed by the United States that she sank.

=== 4 March ===
List of shipwrecks: 4 March 2026
Ship	State	Description
Arctic Metagaz	Russia	Russian invasion of Ukraine: The 909-foot (277 m), 77,551-ton LNG tanker sank from explosions in the Mediterranean Sea 130 nautical miles (240 km) north of Sirte, Libya (34°17′N 17°04′E). Russia stated that the ship had been sunk by Ukrainian naval drones.
IRIS Dena	Islamic Republic of Iran Navy	A photo of Dena sinking 2026 Iran war: The Moudge-class frigate was torpedoed and sunk off the coast of Sri Lanka by USS Charlotte (United States Navy) with considerable loss of life. Thirty-two of her 180 crew were rescued. Eighty-seven people were killed and sixty-one were reported missing.
QB 11288-TS	Vietnam	The 14.9-metre (49 ft) trap fishing vessel ran aground in conditions of big waves and strong winds, capsized and sank in Nhật Lệ River estuary 100 metres (330 ft) north of My Canh, Vietnam. Six crew survived and one died.

=== 5 March ===
List of shipwrecks: 5 March 2026
Ship	State	Description
Sonangol Namibe	Bahamas	2026 Iran war: The tanker suffered an explosion on her port side southeast of Kuwait. Small boats were observed in the vicinity, believed hostile.
Yankee Rose	United States	The 14-metre (46 ft) fishing boat capsized and sank in Cape Cod Bay approximately 3 nautical miles (5.6 km) northeast of Race Point, Cape Cod, Massachusetts. Of two crew, one was killed and the other reported missing.

=== 6 March ===
List of shipwrecks: 6 March 2026
Ship	State	Description
Falerno	Italy	The 60-metre (200 ft) out of service passenger vessel sprung a leak, capsized, and sank at Pier 28 in Naples, Italy.
Mussafah 2	United Arab Emirates	2026 Iran war: The 26-metre (85 ft), 134-ton tug was struck by a missile in the Strait of Hormuz whilst going to the assistance of Safeen Prestige (Malta). All eight crew were possibly killed.
Unknown	unknown	A 69-ton fishing boat sank near Sohwasado Island, Ocheon-myeon, Boryeong, South Korea. Of eight crew, seven were rescued. The vessel's captain was reported missing.

=== 8 March ===
List of shipwrecks: 8 March 2026
Ship	State	Description
St. Joseph	India	The anchored fishing trawler was sunk in the Indian Ocean when struck by tanker Solis (Panama) approximately 120 nautical miles (220 km) off the coast of Kerala, India. Nine people were rescued, two others reported missing.

=== 9 March ===
List of shipwrecks: 9 March 2026
Ship	State	Description
P'tit Vox	France	The 13.25-metre (43.5 ft), 13.7-ton scallop vessel sank in the English Channel in a collision with the fishing vessel Saint Jean (France) off Port-en-Bessin, France. All three crew were rescued by the fishing vessel Indépendant (France).
QB-11064 TS	Vietnam	The 13.25-metre (43.5 ft) fishing vessel capsized and partially sank at the mouth of Nhật Lệ River near Đồng Hới, Vietnam. Later pumped out and brought ashore. All five crew were rescued.

=== 10 March ===
List of shipwrecks: 10 March 2026
Ship	State	Description
Vanuatu Ferry	Vanuatu	The retired 1986-built passenger/roro ferry was scuttled in deep water off Efate, Vanuatu.

=== 11 March ===
List of shipwrecks: 11 March 2026
Ship	State	Description
Express Rome	Liberia	2026 Iran war: The cargo ship was struck by projectiles in the Strait of Hormuz. It reportedly ignored warnings from the Iranian Navy.
ONE Majesty	Japan	2026 Iran war: The container ship was struck by projectiles in the Strait of Hormuz 25 nautical miles (46 km) off the coast of the United Arab Emirates.
Star Gwyneth	Marshall Islands	2026 Iran war: The cargo ship was struck by projectiles in the Strait of Hormuz 50 nautical miles (93 km) north west of Dubai.
Theresa I	The Philippines	The cargo ship capsized and sank at dock due to misloading at Berth 1, Apo Cement Port, Naga City, Cebu, Philippines. All crew survived but a dock worker was killed by a snapped line.
Vesta Renee	United States	The 40-foot (12 m) cabin cruiser was swamped by a large wave and sank approximately 23 miles (37 km) south of Boothbay Harbor, Maine. Her three crew were rescued by the United States Coast Guard.

=== 12 March ===
List of shipwrecks: 12 March 2026
Ship	State	Description
Safesea Vishnu	Marshall Islands	2026 Iran war: The tanker was attacked off Khor Al Zubair, Iran by a suicide boat. One of her 27 crew was killed.

=== 13 March ===
List of shipwrecks: 13 March 2026
Ship	State	Description
Truong Hung 268	Vietnam	The 77-metre (253 ft), 3,587-ton cargo ship ran aground in the South China Sea approximately 7 nautical miles (13 km) southeast of the An Thanh Nam Sandbank, near the mouth of Định An River, off Cần Thơ in rough weather conditions with high waves and strong winds and sank. All four crew were rescued.

=== 14 March ===
List of shipwrecks: 14 March 2026
Ship	State	Description
Unknown	South Korea	A 29-ton fishing vessel burned to the waterline and sank off Jeju Island. Eight crew were rescued, and two others were reported missing.

=== 16 March ===
List of shipwrecks: 16 March 2026
Ship	State	Description
Pepe Mases	Spain	The 21-metre (69 ft) fishing vessel caught fire in the Balearic Sea 8 nautical miles (15 km) east of Benicàssim, Spain. She burned out and sank. All three crew were rescued.

=== 17 March ===
List of shipwrecks: 17 March 2026
Ship	State	Description
Kofuku Maru No. 65	Japan	The 140-ton fishing trawler collided with the cargo ship Suehiro Maru (Japan), capsized, and sank around 20 kilometres (12 mi) off Misawa in Aomori Prefecture, Japan. Four crew were killed and nine crew were rescued.
La Negra Francisca Duarte II	Equador	The 22-metre (72 ft) fishing vessel was bombed, set on fire, and sunk by US military drones about 170 nautical miles (310 km) from the Galápagos Islands in the Pacific Ocean.

=== 18 March ===
List of shipwrecks: 18 March 2026
Ship	State	Description
Astana	Romania	The tugboat capsized and sank in the Black Sea approximately 8.6 kilometres (5.3 mi) offshore from Midia Port in 26 metres (85 ft) of water while assisting the oil tanker Amades (Marshall Islands) in rough seas and poor visibility. One crew was killed and four crew were reported missing.

=== 21 March ===
List of shipwrecks: 21 March 2026
Ship	State	Description
Min Lian Yu 63896	China	The 38-metre (125 ft) fishing boat sprung a leak and was abandoned, drifting ashore near Dongyin, Matsu Islands, Taiwan. Salvage is underway.

=== 23 March ===
List of shipwrecks: 23 March 2026
Ship	State	Description
African Buzzard	Bahamas	The 199.99-metre (656.1 ft) bulk carrier collided with the cargo ship Pac Dubhe (Singapore) on the Mississippi River at mile marker 124.5 (29°58′N 90°24′W) just above New Orleans. Her anchor embedded into the bow of Pac Dubhe, she then drifted out of the channel and ran aground. Was refloated and underway by 26 March.

=== 24 March ===
List of shipwrecks: 24 March 2026
Ship	State	Description
Unknown	Unknown	A migrant vessel capsized and sank off Djibouti. Of 320 on board, 9 died and over 40 others were reported missing.

=== 25 March ===
List of shipwrecks: 25 March 2026
Ship	State	Description
Seahund-Cux 19	Germany	The 16-metre (52 ft) fishing vessel sprung a leak and sank at dock in the Elbe River at Cuxhaven, Germany. The vessel was lifted by crane the next day.

=== 26 March ===
List of shipwrecks: 26 March 2026
Ship	State	Description
Miss Dakar 2	Morocco	The fishing vessel was sunk in a collision with the longliner Njm Al Shamal (Libya) 80 miles (130 km) off Dakhla, Western Sahara. Eight crew were rescued, and five others were reported missing.

=== 27 March ===
List of shipwrecks: 27 March 2026
Ship	State	Description
Mayuree Naree	Thailand	2026 Iran war: The cargo ship drifted ashore near the village of Ramchah on Qeshm Island, Iran in the Strait of Hormuz after she was hit by projectiles on 11 March, whilst trying to cross the Strait of Hormuz. Of the 23 people on board 20 were rescued and three were reported missing.

=== 29 March ===
List of shipwrecks: 29 March 2026
Ship	State	Description
Noahs 2	Australia	The 21.5-metre (71 ft) Volvo Ocean 70 class racing yacht was destroyed by fire at Newcastle.

=== Unknown date ===
List of shipwrecks: unknown date in March 2026
Ship	State	Description
Safeen Prestige	Malta	2026 Iran war: The container ship was hit by two missiles in the Strait of Hormuz, 2 nautical miles (3.7 km) off the coast of Oman on 4 March. Her crew were rescued. A possible second strike may have been made in mid-March. Reported on 1 April as sunk in the Strait of Hormuz, near the northernmost tip of Oman's Musandam Peninsula in 120 metres (390 ft) of water, date of sinking is unclear.

== April ==
=== 2 April ===
List of shipwrecks: 2 April 2026
Ship	State	Description
Ocean Bay	United States	The 58-foot (18 m) fishing vessel ran aground in the Bering Sea on the north shore of Umnak Island, Alaska (53°19′32″N 168°13′00″W). Five crewmen were rescued by a United States Coast Guard helicopter.

=== 3 April ===
List of shipwrecks: 3 April 2026
Ship	State	Description
Volgo-Balt 138	Russia	Russian invasion of Ukraine: The Volgo-Balt-class cargo ship was hit by Ukrainian drones in the Sea of Azov and either sank on 3 April, or was towed to shore on 5 April to Kuchugury, where it probably sank. Three crew were killed and eight survivors reached shore in a lifeboat on 5 April.

=== 4 April ===
List of shipwrecks: 4 April 2026
Ship	State	Description
Fiji Princess	Fiji	The cruise ship ran aground off Monuriki, Fiji. All 30 passengers and seventeen of her 31 crew were evacuated from the ship.
Legacy	United States	The 40-foot (12 m) fishing vessel ran aground on rocks at Atlantic Road, Gloucester, Rhode Island, breaking up the next day. Two crewmen were rescued.

=== 6 April ===
List of shipwrecks: 6 April 2026
Ship	State	Description
Admiral Makarov	Russian Navy	Russian invasion of Ukraine: The Admiral Grigorovich-class frigate was attacked by a Ukrainian Navy drone at Novorossiysk and was severely damaged.
Syvash	Russia	Russian invasion of Ukraine: The oil rig was attacked by a Ukrainian Navy drone at Novorossiysk and was set afire.

=== 8 April ===
List of shipwrecks: 8 April 2026
Ship	State	Description
Gale	United States	The 20-metre (66 ft) tugboat sank after striking an object in Curtis Creek in Baltimore, Maryland. Salvage is expected.
O Pillo	Spain	The 10-metre (33 ft) fishing vessel suffered a hull breach with ensuing water ingress, about 2 nautical miles (3.7 km) north northwest of Baixos de Baldaio, A Coruña, off Carballo, Spain, causing her to capsize and sink. The vessel's crew was rescued from a life raft by Carmen Jose (Spain).

=== 9 April ===
List of shipwrecks: 9 April 2026
Ship	State	Description
Tanjina Sultana	Bangladesh	A trawler carrying Rohingya refugees and Bangaldeshi nationals capsized in the Andaman Sea. Nine people were rescued and around 250 were reported missing.

=== 11 April ===
List of shipwrecks: 11 April 2026
Ship	State	Description
City of Sistersville II	United States	The 32-foot (9.8 m), 14-ton ferry or tugboat sprung a leak and sank in shallow water in the Ohio River at Sistersville, West Virginia after being refloated on 11 April. It had been pushed ashore by the river current after being returned to the river on 9 April from winter storage. Salvage is expected.

=== 15 April ===
List of shipwrecks: 15 April 2026
Ship	State	Description
DNa 91009-TS	Vietnam	The fishing vessel sank after a hull breach about 4 nautical miles (7.4 km) off Thang Truong commune, Đà Nẵng, Vietnam in the South China Sea. Vietnamese Border Guards used BP 08-15-03 to rescue the two crew.

=== 17 April ===
List of shipwrecks: 17 April 2026
Ship	State	Description
Sola Gratia	Netherlands	The 86-metre (282 ft) cargo ship carrying sand sank overnight on the Scheldt near Antwerp, Belgium after a collision with mooring bollards near the Royers Lock with two crew members rescued and diesel pollution causing shipping to be halted and a lengthy cleanup operation.

=== 18 April ===
List of shipwrecks: 18 April 2026
Ship	State	Description
Mariana	United States	Typhoon Sinlaku: The 145-foot (44 m), 450-ton cargo ship's capsized hull was spotted at a position about 34 nautical miles (63 km) northeast of Pagan, approximately 100 nautical miles (190 km) from Mariana's last known position, and about 200 nautical miles (370 km) north of Saipan after going missing on 16 April. One body was recovered and five crew were reported missing.

=== 22 April ===
List of shipwrecks: 22 April 2026
Ship	State	Description
Don Juan II	Chile	The 58-metre (190 ft) fishing boat went aground in the Pacific Ocean along the coast of Cobquecura, Chile.
La Malouine	France	The brigantine ran aground on the beach in Ramsey Bay after breaking lose from its anchor. Later refloated.

=== 23 April ===
List of shipwrecks: 23 April 2026
Ship	State	Description
Jozani II	Indonesia	The 16-metre (52 ft) cargo ship drifted aground on a reef off Mombasa, Kenya after she capsized off Nungwi in Unguwa, after being hit by huge waves on 17 April. At the time ten crew were rescued, while her captain and three crew were reported missing.

=== 27 April ===
List of shipwrecks: 27 April 2026
Ship	State	Description
Unknown	Vietnam	A fishing vessel exploded, burned, and sank at dock at the Tac Cau ferry terminal area, Binh An commune, An Giang province, Vietnam. Many people were injured.

=== 29 April ===
List of shipwrecks: 29 April 2026
Ship	State	Description
New Look	France	The 15-metre (49 ft) trawler sank at Loire-Atlantique. Raised on 1 May.

=== Unknown April ===
List of shipwrecks: unknown April 2026
Ship	State	Description
Vagabond des Mers	United Kingdom	The abandoned fishing trawler drifted aground in the River Taw Estuary between Barnstaple and Braunton sometime in April 2026. Scrapped in November, 2026.

== May ==
=== 1 May ===
List of shipwrecks: 1 May 2026
Ship	State	Description
Ninova	Cameroon	The 83-metre (272 ft), 2,541-ton cargo ship dragged anchor in a storm and went aground off Sakarya, Turkey, in the Black Sea. The crew were rescued with a breeches buoy system. Salvage work began on 7 July and the vessel was refloated on 12 July.

=== 3 May ===
List of shipwrecks: 3 May 2026
Ship	State	Description
NT-02034TS	Vietnam	The 24-metre (79 ft) fishing vessel burned out at anchor at My Tan 2 hamlet, Vinh Hai commune, Khánh Hòa Province, Vietnam.
NT-02172TS	Vietnam	The 22.9-metre (75 ft) fishing vessel burned out at anchor at My Tan 2 hamlet, Vinh Hai commune, Khánh Hòa Province, Vietnam after NT-02034TS (Vietnam) caught fire.
Unknown barge	United States	A barge sprung a leak and was beached, partially sunk, in Narragansett Bay northeast of Point Judith, Rhode Island.

=== 4 May ===
List of shipwrecks: 4 May 2026
Ship	State	Description
QT-22097-TS	Vietnam	The fishing vessel sank in a thunderstorm 0.5 nautical miles (0.93 km) off Mỹ Thủy, Quảng Trị Province, Vietnam, in the South China Sea. The two crew swam to shore.

=== 6 May ===
List of shipwrecks: 6 May 2026
Ship	State	Description
Corsage C.	Vanuatu	The 88-metre (289 ft), 1,939-ton cargo ship struck rocks and sank 180 metres (590 ft) north of Andros, Greece in the Aegean Sea in rough seas. All nine crew were rescued.

=== 7 May ===
List of shipwrecks: 7 May 2026
Ship	State	Description
Unknown	South Korea	A 20-ton fishing boat was sunk in a collision with a 196-ton transport vessel (name unknown) in the Sea of Japan approximately 17 nautical miles (31 km) southeast of the port of Daebyeon, Gijang-gun, Busan, South Korea.

=== 13 May ===
List of shipwrecks: 13 May 2026
Ship	State	Description
Haji Ali	India	2026 Iran War: The 57-metre (187 ft) cargo ship capsized and sank off Limah, Oman after an attack by a drone or missile.

=== 15 May ===
List of shipwrecks: 15 May 2026
Ship	State	Description
Bucaneer	United States	The 68-foot (21 m) shrimp boat ran aground in the Gulf of Mexico at Crystal Beach on the Bolivar Peninsula, Galveston, Texas. Wave action pushed the boat up the beach. The ship was refloated on 27 May.
Skandi Amazonas	Brazil	The 95-metre (312 ft) offshore supply ship struck rocks near Praía Campìsta, in the Santana Archipelago, Rio de Janeiro State, Brazil. She was run around to prevent sinking. The vessel was later declared an economic/constructive total loss and was refloated on 6 August.

=== 17 May ===
List of shipwrecks: 17 May 2026
Ship	State	Description
Dan	Tanzania	The 200-metre (660 ft) cargo ship ran aground off Mombasa, Kenya (03°59′S 39°45′E). Attempts to refloat, including one on 13 July, failed.

=== 24 May ===
List of shipwrecks: 15 May 2026
Ship	State	Description
Kuparu	New Zealand	The restored World War II Harbour Defence Motor Launch of the Royal New Zealand Navy suffered mechanical and electrical failure and began leaking in the Tasman Sea, 70 nautical miles (130 km) off Ninety Mile Beach. The crew of three were rescued by helicopter but, as of 28 May, the abandoned ship had not been located.

=== 28 May ===
List of shipwrecks: 28 May 2026
Ship	State	Description
Two unknown boats	South Korea	A 1.2-ton fishing boat was destroyed by fire at dock at Nokdong, Goheung-gun, South Korea. The fire spread destroying a 2-ton fishing vessel and damaging another 1.2-ton fishing vessel.

=== 31 May ===
List of shipwrecks: 31 May 2026
Ship	State	Description
Big Boss Diamond	Turkey	The 28-metre (92 ft) pirate themed passenger excursion vessel listed to starboard, filled and sank in Akvaryum Bay off Marmaris, Turkey with her masts still above water.

=== Unknown date ===
List of shipwrecks: Unknown date in May 2026
Ship	State	Description
CMA CGM San Antonio	Malta	2026 Iran War: The container ship was struck by a missile in the Strait of Hormuz. She was declared a constructive total loss.

== June ==
=== 5 June ===
List of shipwrecks: 5 May 2026
Ship	State	Description
Golden Star 1	Tanzania	The 177-metre (581 ft) cargo ship sank in the Singapore Strait about 6 kilometres (3.7 mi) off Batam Island, Indonesia.

=== 7 June ===
List of shipwrecks: 7 June 2026
Ship	State	Description
Eagle Wings III	Singapore	The 112-foot (34 m) sailing super yacht caught fire at the ONE15 Marina, Sentosa Cove, Singapore. She drifted off and sank. salvage (scrapping?) began 9 July, expected to be completed 20 July.

=== 8 June ===
List of shipwrecks: 8 May 2026
Ship	State	Description
MSCI 1	Gabon	The cargo ship sprang a leak in stormy weather and was beached off Barangay Badoc, Philippines.

=== 11 June ===
List of shipwrecks: 11 June 2026
Ship	State	Description
Caroline Bezengi	Cameroon	The 273-metre (896 ft) Supermax tanker (ex-SCF Altai) was damaged by an onboard explosion off Yemen on 8 June. The crew abandoned ship on 11 June, probably when she went aground on rocks off the southwest tip of Jazirat Al Qibliyyah, Oman. By mid-August 2026 she was partially submerged and had lost thousands of tons of crude oil.
TCG Sokullu Mehmet Paşa	Turkey	The decommissioned vessel was sunk as a target in a SINKEX exercise in the eastern Mediterranean Sea. She was sunk by an AKYA torpedo fired from TCG Sakarya.

=== 12 June ===
List of shipwrecks: 12 June 2026
Ship	State	Description
Unknown	Unknown	A supply ship was sunk in a collision with a landing craft off Pasir Panjang Terminal in Singapore. Three bodies were recovered, possibly crewmembers.

=== 14 June ===
List of shipwrecks: 14 June 2026
Ship	State	Description
Beneteau Oceanis 56.1	France	The sail yacht was sunk in a collision with the high-speed craft Krilo Eclipse (Croatia) in the Split Channel between the islands of Šolta and Brač, Croatia. Four people died and one went missing from the hospital. The vessel was salvaged by a crane from 60-metre (200 ft) of water on 27 September and taken to Split.
Philippine Siren 2	Philippines	The 173-ton dive yacht dragged anchor in a storm and went aground on a reef in the Tubbataha Reef National Park. Refloated on 20 June and towed to Puerto Princesa City on Palawan Island, Philippines for repairs.
QN-90627 TS	Vietnam	The fishing vessel sank in the South China Sea off Cai Chien, Quảng Ninh, Quảng Ninh province Vietnam due to strong currents. The crew were rescued by a patrol boat. Salvage is expected.

=== 16 June ===
List of shipwrecks: 16 June 2026
Ship	State	Description
Bright Future	United Kingdom	2026 English Channel incident: The yacht was fired on by the frigate Admiral Grigorovich (Russian Navy) in the English Channel between Normandy, France and the Isle of Wight (50°10′N 1°10′W).

=== 17 June ===
List of shipwrecks: 17 June 2026
Ship	State	Description
TH-91220 TS	Vietnam	The fishing vessel was pushed onto rocks by high wind and strong waves and sank approximately 21 nautical miles (39 km) from Tran Island, Tran Island Commune, Quảng Ninh province, Vietnam. The crew were rescued by a patrol boat. Salvage is expected.

=== 18 June ===
List of shipwrecks: 18 June 2026
Ship	State	Description
Ocean Otter	Canada	The fishing vessel burned and sank in the Bay of Fundy approximately 22 kilometres (14 mi) from Parkers Cove, Nova Scotia, Canada. The crew were rescued by Laure O (Canada).

=== 19 June ===
List of shipwrecks: 19 June 2026
Ship	State	Description
Nirai Kanai II	Japan	The 181-metre (594 ft) cargo ship ran aground on a rocky part of the western side of Toshima Island in the Izu archipelago off Tokyo (34°32′N 139°16′E) in southeastern winds of 6 meters per second (21.6 kph) and a swell of 50 centimeters. Pulled off 2 weeks later.

=== 25 June ===
List of shipwrecks: 25 June 2026
Ship	State	Description
Je3 Dongah	South Korea	The 79-ton fishing vessel capsized and sank in a collision with the LPG tanker Gas Broadway (South Korea) approximately 42.6 kilometres (26.5 mi) southeast of Daebyeon Port in Gijang County, Busan, South Korea in 140-metre (460 ft) of water. Her captain died. Five people were rescued by the tanker, and two others reported missing.

=== 27 June ===
List of shipwrecks: 27 June 2026
Ship	State	Description
USS Juneau	United States Navy	Exercise Valiant Shield: The decommissioned Austin-class amphibious transport dock was sunk in the Pacific Ocean about 200 nautical miles (370 km) off the coast of Guam. The ship was struck three times; by a US Navy Boeing P-8A Poseidon aircraft-launched AGM-84D Harpoon missile, a Northrop B-2 Spirit bomber aircraft-launched Long Range Anti-Ship Missile, then she was torpedoed and sunk by a Japanese warship.

=== 28 June ===
List of shipwrecks: 28 June 2026
Ship	State	Description
Botticelli	France	The cruise ship caught fire at Honfleur, Manche. All 163 passengers and crew were evacuated.

=== 29 June ===
List of shipwrecks: 29 June 2026
Ship	State	Description
12 boats	Vietnam	A fishing vessel caught fire while anchored with other fishing boats. The fire quickly spread resulting in the destruction or sinking of 12 boats in the Thi Nai lagoon, Gia Lai province, Vietnam.

=== 30 June ===
List of shipwrecks: 30 May 2026
Ship	State	Description
Caroline Bezengi	Cameroon	2026 Iran war: The 274-metre (899 ft) shadow fleet tanker ship suffered an explosion, possibly a Limpet mine, on 8 June off Yemen. She was abandoned and drifted aground on rocks off Jazirat Al Qibliyyah, Al-Qibliyyah Island in the Hallaniyat Islands nature reserve, in the Hallaniyat Islands off Dhofar, Oman on 30 June. Offloading of what remained of 880,000 tons of Russian crude oil began in mid-November.
Onego Otra	Antigua and Barbuda	The 146-metre (479 ft) cargo ship ran aground in the St. Lawrence River, near the Saint-Ours Island in Contrecoeur, Quebec, Canada (45°55′N 73°13′W). Lightering to reduce weight began 11 July.
Unknown	Poland	A yacht sank in shallow water with superstructure above water at the port of Vourkario, Salamis, Greece. Expected to be lifted soon.

== July ==
=== 1 July ===
List of shipwrecks: 1 July 2026
Ship	State	Description
Argosy IV	United States	The 408-foot (124 m) barge, a former "river boat" casino, was sunk as an artificial reef in 122 feet (37 m) of water in the Gulf of Mexico approximately 23 nmi (43 km; 26 mi) south of Orange Beach, Alabama.

=== 2 July ===
List of shipwrecks: 2 July 2026
Ship	State	Description
Pilot	United States	The 121-foot (37 m) historic schooner, a former pilot boat which had also served as a floating seasonal bar from 2017 to 2025, was found on the bottom after sinking sometime during the night of 1–2 July at her moorings in the Henry Street Basin in the Red Hook neighborhood of Brooklyn, New York.

=== 3 July ===
List of shipwrecks: 3 July 2026
Ship	State	Description
QN-90568-TS	Vietnam	The fishing vessel sank in a storm in the Gulf of Tonkin off Co tho, Quảng Ninh Province, Vietnam (20°49′N 107°48′E). The crew was rescued.

=== 4 July ===
List of shipwrecks: 4 July 2026
Ship	State	Description
Zhonghong Fazhan	China	The 16-metre (52 ft) bulk carrier went missing and apparently sank off Qinzhou Port in the Guangxi Zhuang Autonomous Region, China. One crewmember died, ten were rescued.

=== 5 July ===
List of shipwrecks: 5 July 2026
Ship	State	Description
QN-8706	Vietnam	Tropical Storm Maysak (Henry)/ Storm No. 1: The cargo vessel sank in a storm in the Chuong Cat area, Mui Ngoc Sea, Vietnam. The crew was rescued.
Victory Chimes	United States	The 127.5-foot (38.9 m) historic schooner, the last surviving "Chesapeake ram", a kind of flat-bottomed schooner, was found on the bottom at her moorings in the Henry Street Basin in the Red Hook neighborhood of Brooklyn, New York. She had begun to take on water during a storm on 3 July and had eventually sunk sometime after that.

=== 6 July ===
List of shipwrecks: 6 July 2026
Ship	State	Description
BTh 98379 TS	Vietnam	The fishing vessel was sunk in a collision with cargo ship Viet Thuan 11-07 (Vietnam) about 10 nautical miles (19 km) southeast of Phu Hai Port, Phan Thiết, Bình Thuận Province, Vietnam. Seventeen crew were rescued, one died.

=== 7 July ===
List of shipwrecks: 7 July 2026
Ship	State	Description
Chiltern	Nicaragua	The abandoned 183-metre (600 ft) tanker dragged anchor and was driven ashore off Manori, Mumbai, India, in a storm.

=== 8 July ===
List of shipwrecks: 8 July 2026
Ship	State	Description
ATK Nyein	Myanmar	The 53-metre (174 ft) cargo ship sank about 27.5 nautical miles (50.9 km) west of Kalakot Island, Myanmar. The crew were rescued by the Myanmar Navy.

=== 9 July ===
List of shipwrecks: 9 July 2026
Ship	State	Description
Al Hamdan Yaqoob	India	The 60-metre (200 ft) cargo ship sprung a leak and sank about 32 nautical miles (59 km) south of Ormara, Balochistan, Pakistan in the Arabian Sea. The crew were rescued by PNS Haneen (Pakistan Navy).
Six boats	Vietnam	A fishing vessel caught fire while anchored with other fishing boats. The fire quickly spread resulting in the destruction or sinking of six boats in the Tam Quan fishing port, Gia Lai province, Vietnam.

=== 9 July ===
List of shipwrecks: 9 July 2026
Ship	State	Description
Al Hamdan Yaqoob	India	The 60-metre (200 ft) cargo ship sprung a leak and sank about 32 nautical miles south of Ormara, Balochistan, Pakistan in the Arabian Sea. The crew was rescued by PNS Haneen (Pakistan Navy).

=== 11 July ===
List of shipwrecks: 11 July 2026
Ship	State	Description
Silvana VIII	Cyprus	Typhoon Bavi: The 332-metre (1,089 ft) cargo ship ran aground near Daishan, Zhoushan, China. It sank by the stern with the bow in the air after a salvage attempt on 4 August 2026 failed.

=== 14 July ===
List of shipwrecks: 14 July 2026
Ship	State	Description
Izmarud	Russian Navy	Russian invasion of Ukraine: The 62.5-metre (205.1 ft) Project 22460 Okhotnik-class patrol vessel was sunk with a Sargan-3000 drone at dock near Novorossiysk.
Luni	Saint Kitts and Nevis	The 98-metre (322 ft) cargo ship broke in two, or jack knifed, after a collision a few days earlier off Qeshm Island, Iran, sinking at Bandar Abbas.
Volare	United States of America	The 15-metre (49.2 ft) cabin cruiser capsized in the San Francisco Bay near Alcatraz Island, California after a wave struck it. One person was killed, 16 were rescued, and three were reported missing.

=== 16 July ===
List of shipwrecks: 16 July 2026
Ship	State	Description
Manantial	Ecuador	The 100-metre (330 ft) cargo ship was anchored in Concepción Bay off Isla de los Reyes beach in Talcahuano, Chile, detained over unpaid bills since 2019, but dragged anchor and went adrift in stormy weather. She was grounded/beached by two tugboats in the Los Reyes beach area.
Pam Leopardo	Chile	The 38-metre (125 ft) fishing vessel ran aground on the rocks of La Aguada, Corral, Chile in the Los Ríos Region, after dragging anchor in strong winds and heavy swells in Corral Bay. Still aground as of 4 August.

=== 17 July ===
List of shipwrecks: 17 July 2026
Ship	State	Description
USS Peleliu	United States Navy	The decommissioned Tarawa-class amphibious assault ship was sunk as a target in the Pacific Ocean north of Kauai, Hawaii, by a Harpoon missile fired by the guided-missile frigate Álvaro de Bazán (Spanish Navy).

=== 18 July ===
List of shipwrecks: 18 July 2026
Ship	State	Description
Barima	Guyana	The ferry capsized and sank off coast of Guyana. 67 people were rescued out of 116 passengers and crew.
Unknown	China (?)	A suspected Chinese fishing vessel flooded and sank approximately 0.5 nautical miles (0.93 km) northeast of Yeonpyeongdo, Incheon, South Korea. Other Chinese fishing boats were observed rescuing the crew.

=== 21 July ===
List of shipwrecks: 21 July 2026
Ship	State	Description
Algoma Equinox	Canada	The 224-metre (735 ft) cargo ship ran aground (42°59′N 82°25′W) near Cargill's Sarnia Grain Terminal, Ontario, Canada. Pulled off the next day.
Persada 7	Indonesia	The 25-metre (82 ft) tugboat sank in high waves off Tambelan, Bintan, Indonesia.
Unknown	Liberia	A tanker was attacked in the Black Sea while carrying liquefied gas en route to Ukraine from Alexandria, Egypt. The attack, which Romania said was likely carried out by Russia, caused a major fire and forced the crew to evacuate. Three people were injured, two of them seriously burned.

=== 23 July ===
List of shipwrecks: 23 July 2026
Ship	State	Description
Idem	France	The 12-metre (39 ft) sailboat was damaged by orcas and sank 1.3 nautical miles (2.4 km) from Faro de Estaca de Bares near A Coruña.

=== 24 July ===
List of shipwrecks: 24 July 2026
Ship	State	Description
QNg 95267-TS	Vietnam	The 21-metre (69 ft) fishing vessel sank in a storm in the South China Sea, near Da Tay in the Spratly Islands. 33 crew were rescued, with 3 others reported missing.

=== 25 July ===
List of shipwrecks: 25 July 2026
Ship	State	Description
Khoi Nguyen 18	Vietnam	The 69-metre (226 ft) cargo vessel sank in a storm in the South China Sea, near Fiery Cross Reef in the Spratly Islands. Forty-five people were rescued while 17 more were reported missing.

=== 26 July ===
List of shipwrecks: 26 July 2026
Ship	State	Description
AOM 787	Indonesia	The tugboat got in trouble in stormy weather on the night of 25 July. She capsized and sank at mid-day 26 July off the Riau Islands in the South China Sea. Four crew members were rescued by the cargo ship Shanghai Voyager (South Korea) from a liferaft.
Golden Leo	Guinea-Bissau	The 100-metre (330 ft) cargo ship was scuttled, or capsized and sank, after being hit at starboard side by three Russian Kh-59/Kh-69 cruise missiles on 20 July off the coast of Odesa, Ukraine. The attack killed nine crew and a harbor pilot after the grain-laden vessel had just departed the port, while eight crew members were rescued. Her cargo was removed by lightering.

=== 28 July ===
List of shipwrecks: 28 July 2026
Ship	State	Description
Viking Allur	Switzerland	The 135-metre (443 ft) passenger vessel ran aground in the Danube at river kilometre 817 about 25 kilometres (16 mi) upstream from Vidin, Bulgaria. Refloated on 1 August.

=== 29 July ===
List of shipwrecks: 29 July 2026
Ship	State	Description
Energos Winter	Marshall Islands	The 277-metre (909 ft) gas tanker drifted aground in the port of Damietta after being damaged by, apparently, Houthi drones. Refloated on 9 August.

=== 31 July ===
List of shipwrecks: 31 July 2026
Ship	State	Description
Sefora	Cameroon	The 114-metre (374 ft) cargo ship suffered water ingress at its mooring in Hereke Port in the Körfez District of Kocaeli, Turkey and sank partially submerged at dock.
Unknown	United States	A 20-foot (6.1 m) tugboat sprung a leak and then sank in a storm with its pilot house above water in Mobile Bay near Mullet Point Park, Alabama.
Yanina	Russia	Russian invasion of Ukraine: The 142-metre (466 ft) cargo ship was sunk by two Ukrainian drones in the Black Sea 130 nautical miles (240 km) from Novorossiysk. Sixteen of her seventeen crew were rescued by Delphius (Antigua and Barbuda) and one by a Russian helicopter.

=== Unknown date ===
List of shipwrecks: unknown date in July 2026
Ship	State	Description
Ya	Netherlands	The 10-metre (33 ft) "sustainable" sailing yacht burned and sank south of Singapore near Bantan sometime in July.

== August ==
=== 2 August ===
List of shipwrecks: 2 August 2026
Ship	State	Description
KMP Mutiara Sentosa 2	Indonesia	The ferry caught fire off Madura Island. Of the 271 people on board, five people were killed and 41 were reported missing, 225 were rescued. She was on a voyage from Surabaya to Makassar.

=== 4 August ===
List of shipwrecks: 4 August 2026
Ship	State	Description
Faize Noore Oliya	India	The cargo ship was sunk by an explosive boat, probably Houthi, in the Red Sea about 13 nmi (24 km) south of Hodeidah. The crew was rescued by the Yemen Coast Guard.

=== 5 August ===
List of shipwrecks: 5 August 2026
Ship	State	Description
Mera Queen	Guinea Bissau	Russian invasion of Ukraine: The 91-metre (299 ft) cargo ship was sunk by a Russian air attack by three missiles and several drones at Odesa.

=== 9 August ===
List of shipwrecks: 9 August 2026
Ship	State	Description
Unknown	Unknown	A vessel was sunk by a Houthi ballistic missile and drone attack on Mokha, Yemen, in the Red Sea.

=== 11 August ===
List of shipwrecks: 11 August 2026
Ship	State	Description
Angiola	Malta	The 37-metre (121 ft) yacht caught fire in the engine room causing a leak that resulted in her capsizing and sinking off Porto Cervo, Sardinia, Italy, in the waters between Isla de la Cappuccini and Capo Ferro on the Costa Smeralda. Refloated 4 September and taken to La Maddalena.
Mbuya Nehanda	Zimbabwe	2026 Lake Kariba ferry accident: The ferry capsized in Lake Kariba with the loss of at least 94 lives. She was on a voyage from Kariba to Chalala. 77 people were rescued.

=== 12 August ===
List of shipwrecks: 12 August 2026
Ship	State	Description
Calcasieu Pass	United States	The retired 154-foot (47 m) fishing vessel was sunk as an artificial reef at Delaware Reef Site 13, approximately 26 nautical miles (48 km) off the Indian River Inlet.
KM Putri Yasmin	Indonesia	The ferry caught fire off Lombok Island. One person died and 212 were rescued. She was on a voyage from Padangbai to Lembar.

=== 14 August ===
List of shipwrecks: 14 August 2026
Ship	State	Description
SL Sual 1	Philippines	The 31.5-metre (103 ft) tugboat was beached near the Bucao River in Barangay Bangan, Zambales, Philippines after being holed in the South China Sea. She capsized and sank during a salvage attempt on 24 August.

=== 15 August ===
List of shipwrecks: 15 August 2026
Ship	State	Description
NA-93311-TS, NA-80261-TS, NA-92046-TS, NA-90934-TS, and NA-80515-TS	Vietnam	Three of the boats were destroyed, and two others damaged overnight in a fire while tied up in Quynh Phu commune, Nghệ An province, Vietnam.

=== 19 August ===
List of shipwrecks: 19 August 2026
Ship	State	Description
TTH 91171-TS	Vietnam	The 19.5-metre (64 ft) fishing vessel dragged anchor in bad weather with strong winds and big waves, and collided with an embankment and then sank in the Tu Hien estuary, Hien An, Vietnam.

=== 21 August ===
List of shipwrecks: 21 August 2026
Ship	State	Description
GL-99322-TS	Vietnam	The 22.6-metre (74 ft) fishing vessel broached, filled, and sank about 5 nautical miles (9.3 km) from De Gi estuary, Vietnam. All 12 crew were rescued by the fishing boats GL-30036-TS and BD-93724-TS (both Vietnam).
Ocean Winner	Panama	The 225-metre (738 ft) bulk carrier capsized and sank in the Bay of Bengal about 240 nautical miles (440 km) off Odisha, India. Two crew were rescued the next day, 22 were reported missing. She was on a voyage from Paradip, India to Singapore.
Viva La Vida	unknown	The 25-metre (82 ft) Oyster 825 class racing yacht struck a reef, capsized and sank at Long Island in the Whitsunday Islands, Queensland, Australia, which forms part of the Great Barrier Reef. She has been floated to the surface with lifting bags, anchored, and will be towed to Mackay, Queensland.

=== 22 August ===
List of shipwrecks: 22 August 2026
Ship	State	Description
Xacal	Flag unknown	The yacht ran aground on rocks and sank in the Cala Comte, Ibiza, Spain. The crew was rescued by three small vessels.

=== 24 August ===
List of shipwrecks: 24 August 2026
Ship	State	Description
Corvo	Spain	The 23-metre (75 ft) longline fishing vessel caught fire eight nautical miles (15 km) northeast of Estaca de Bares late in the evening. The crew were rescued by Río Xunco. She sank before dawn on 25 August.
Unknown	Unknown	A suspected drug smuggling boat was destroyed by the United States Southern Command. Three or four crew killed.

=== 25 August ===
List of shipwrecks: 25 August 2026
Ship	State	Description
Alpha Crux 00	Russia	The 50-metre (160 ft) fishing vessel rolled on its port side and sank, partially submerged, at Dock 7, Montevideo, Uruguay. Salvage is expected.

=== 26 August ===
List of shipwrecks: 26 August 2026
Ship	State	Description
Comillas Tercero	Spain	The 11-metre (36 ft) fishing vessel caught fire and sank in the Bay of Biscay. The crew was rescued by another fishing vessel.

=== 27 August ===
List of shipwrecks: 27 August 2026
Ship	State	Description
Progress IV	Dominican Republic	Russian invasion of Ukraine: The 122-metre (400 ft) cargo ship caught fire and subsequently sank in Romania's exclusive economic zone approximately 15 nautical miles (28 km) from Sfântu Gheorghe in the Black Sea after a probable drone attack. All 12 crew members were recovered alive, ten of them by the Romanian Border Police, and two by Mohamad B (Comoros).

=== 28 August ===
List of shipwrecks: 28 August 2026
Ship	State	Description
Unknown	Unknown	A refueling boat for drug smuggling boats was captured and destroyed by the United States Southern Command in the Pacific Ocean off Ecuador. Crew was removed.

=== 29 August ===
List of shipwrecks: 29 August 2026
Ship	State	Description
Maranello	France	The 22-metre (72 ft) fishing trawler sank approximately 26 nautical miles (48 km) southwest of Plymouth, England, near the Eddystone Lighthouse. Three crew were taken off by Stradale (France) before she sank. Two crew were reported missing.
Pelas 1	unknown	The vessel was wrecked on rocks in a storm off Cape Greco, Konnos Bay, Cyprus.
Perla Bianca	Cayman Islands	The 40-metre (130 ft) superyacht was wrecked on rocks in a storm off Cape Greco, Konnos Bay, Cyprus. Her owner, businessman Dimi Mavropoulos, died after refusing evacuation, or was swept away by waves.
Unknown	Unknown	Four pirate boats were sunk by a joint Turkish Navy and Somalian Armed Forces military strike that apparently liberated the cargo ship Lutof (Cameroon), which had been captured by pirates on 17 August off Jifle, near Eyl, northeastern Nugaal Region, Somalia. Fourteen pirates were killed and two wounded.

=== 30 August ===
List of shipwrecks: 30 August 2026
Ship	State	Description
Filojet	Cyprus	The 38-metre (125 ft) ferry, sailing from Cyprus to Turkey, capsized about 4.8 kilometres (3.0 mi) off Diana Beach near Kyrenia. The ship sank in 514-metre (1,686 ft) of water. 240 of the 267 people aboard the ferry, 259 passengers and eight crew members, were rescued, while 23 died and, as of 6 October, search teams were still working to locate 5 missing passengers.
Golden Sapling	Hong Kong	Russian invasion of Ukraine: The 148-metre (486 ft) tanker with her superstructure gutted by fire, the engine room burnt out, and the hull was damaged, ran aground a short distance off Geyikkoşan area of the Alaçam District, Samsun, Turkey, in the Black Sea after a Ukrainian attack in the Black Sea 90 nautical miles (170 km) off Sinop, Turkey, on 26 August 2026. The crew were rescued by the tanker Maran Pythia (Greece).
Omskiy-107	Russia	Russian invasion of Ukraine: The 108-metre (354 ft) cargo ship with a completely burnt out stern area and missing rescue boat, ran aground a short distance off Şile, Alacali Beach, Turkey, in the Black Sea after a probable Ukrainian attack at an unknown time and location.

=== Unknown date ===
List of shipwrecks: Unknown date in August 2026
Ship	State	Description
QNa-90859-TS	Vietnam	The 23.9-metre (78 ft) squid fishing vessel lost communications on either 22 or 27 August, the last position of the ship was recorded by the tracking system at 12:54 PM on 25 August at 87°50′N 112°20′E. Crew members were found in the water on 12 September 51 nautical miles (94 km) east of Ba Ke Island, Spratly Islands. BD-98960-TS (Vietnam) rescued 30 crew, and BD-98848-TS (Vietnam) rescued two. Nineteen crew were reported missing.

== September ==
=== 1 September ===
List of shipwrecks: 1 September 2026
Ship	State	Description
Legenda Nusantara 699	Indonesia	The 78-metre (256 ft) cargo ship caught fire, burned out and sank in the Tiworo Strait between Pulau Selayar and Pulau Kabaena, in the Bombana Regency, Sulawesi, Indonesia. Two crew were killed.

=== 2 September ===
List of shipwrecks: 2 September 2026
Ship	State	Description
Conquista II	Equador	The fishing vessel was intercepted by the US military in the Pacific Ocean and destroyed.
Irini K	Greece	The 62-metre (203 ft) landing ship/ferry took on water and sank while under tow in winds of 4 to 5 on the Beaufort scale in the Aegean Sea about one nautical mile (1.9 km) east of Sifnos, Greece. Both crewmembers were rescued.
TNS Catcher	South Korea	The 34-metre (112 ft) tugboat capsized in waves reaching up to 1.5 metres (4 ft 11 in) in height and wind speeds of up to 6 metres per second (1,200 ft/min) nine kilometres (5.6 mi) southeast of Oryukdo, Busan, South Korea, and sank two hours later. Two crewmembers were rescued, but one of those died. Six others were reported missing.
Tuğberk İmamoğlu	Turkey	The 90-metre (300 ft), 4,598 DWT cargo ship sank in the Marmara Sea about 18 nautical miles (33 km) south of Silivri in 720 metres (2,360 ft) of water after colliding with the oil tanker Alsu (Turkey). Her captain and 2nd Captain died and 8 crew were reported missing.

=== 3 September ===
List of shipwrecks: 3 September 2026
Ship	State	Description
Svetoslava	Palau	The 133-metre (436 ft) cargo ship sank three nautical miles (5.6 km) north of Cape Yason, Ordu Province, Turkey after springing a leak in the engine room on 28 August approximately 26 nautical miles (48 km) off Doğan Yurt in the Black Sea.

=== 5 September ===
List of shipwrecks: 5 September 2026
Ship	State	Description
Maria Candelaria	Equador	The fishing vessel was seized and sunk by the US military in the Pacific Ocean after her crew was removed.
Noxen or Kylo	Comoros	The 274-metre (899 ft) Russian shadow fleet tanker was destroyed by a United States Central Command attack in the Gulf of Oman.

=== 7 September ===
List of shipwrecks: 7 September 2026
Ship	State	Description
Andrew Wilson	Australia	The 41-metre (135 ft) hopper dredge was scuttled as an artificial reef in the Gulf of St. Vincent, about six kilometres (3.7 mi) off the coast of Brighton, South Australia in 20 metres (66 ft) of water.
Unidentified speedboat	Indonesia	A speedboat, carrying journalists documenting the Anak Krakatoa eruption, disappeared while sailing in the Sunda Strait. Eight people were reported missing.

=== 8 September ===
List of shipwrecks: 8 September 2026
Ship	State	Description
Riesco	Zimbabwe	The 240.5-metre (789 ft) Iranian shadow fleet tanker was destroyed by a United States Central Command attack in the Gulf of Oman.
Russkiy Vostok	Russia	The 58-metre (190 ft) cargo ship broke loose from her mooring in Amur Bay and went adrift running aground near the Tokarevsky Lighthouse in the Vladivostok region. Refloated on 10 September.
Unknown	Unknown	A vessel, being used to refuel narco boats, was captured by US forces, and was destroyed after her crew was removed in the Pacific Ocean off Ecuador.

=== 9 September ===
List of shipwrecks: 9 September 2026
Ship	State	Description
Hercules Star	Gibraltar	2026 Iran war: The 114-metre (374 ft) tanker sank in the Persian Gulf 24 nautical miles (44 km) off Port Rashid, United Arab Emirates after an Iranian drone attack. Previously she was struck in an Iranian attack near the Strait of Hormuz at the entrance to the Persian Gulf on 1 March 2026. One crewman was killed, another reported missing.
June Aster	Philippines	The ferry was destroyed by fire after catching fire about one nautical mile (1.9 km) off Marcilla, on the east side of Busuanga, the hulk eventually drifting aground near Coron, Palawan. The fire, that started in the cargo hold, engulfed the entire ship and burned for more than 17 hours. On board there were 134 people, 117 passengers and 17 crew members, of which 77 were confirmed dead and 8 were reported missing.

=== 10 September ===
List of shipwrecks: 10 September 2026
Ship	State	Description
Al 1	Unknown	The tanker's anchor line snapped near Dhoonidhoo amid strong winds. She drifted into the lagoon from the northern side of Malé and then ran aground on the reef of Malé outside the Carnival area. Significant damage was caused to Malé's reef, before she drifted further and collided with the Sinamalé Bridge near the Citron Restaurant. She drifted until she sank east of the Kaafu Atoll. The nine crew were rescued by the MNDF Coast Guard.
Kg 1	Togo	The 62-metre (203 ft) tanker's anchor line snapped near Dhoonidhoo amid strong winds. She drifted into the lagoon from the northern side of Malé and then ran aground on the reef of Malé outside the Carnival area. Significant damage was caused to Malé's reef, before she drifted further and collided with the Sinamalé Bridge near the Citron Restaurant. She drifted until she sank east of the Kaafu Atoll. The 11 crew were rescued by the MNDF Coast Guard.
Ocean Melody	Liberia	The bulk carrier caught fire while docked at the port of Qingdao, China. There were 42 people on board of whom 25 died and 17 were rescued.

=== 11 September ===
List of shipwrecks: 11 September 2026
Ship	State	Description
Matui	Vanuatu	The ferry, a former prawn trawler, capsized and sank in rough seas in the waters between Espiritu Santo and Ambae in Vanuatu. Three people were rescued by the yacht Lunaris (Cayman Islands) 36 hours later. 12 were spotted by a French Armed Forces aircraft on 13 September. One person died.

=== 12 September ===
List of shipwrecks: 12 September 2026
Ship	State	Description
BTh 80168 TS	Vietnam	The crab net fishing vessel was capsized and sunk by strong waves and fast flowing floodwaters while entering the Ho Lan River estuary. The vessel was pulled ashore later that day.
Star City	Vietnam	The 158-metre (518 ft) cargo ship dragged anchor and drifted aground at Chân Mây - Lăng Cô near Huế, Vietnam (16°19′N 107°59′E) in heavy rainfall and high swells. Refloated the next day.
TTH-30115-TS	Vietnam	The anchored 9-metre (30 ft) fishing vessel was sunk by heavy waves and strong winds while moored in the Thuận An fishing port area near Huế, Vietnam.

=== 13 September ===
List of shipwrecks: 13 September 2026
Ship	State	Description
TB. MT20 1301BG M80	Indonesia	The 20-metre (66 ft) tugboat capsized and sank after being struck by high waves, 1.5–2.5 metres (4 ft 11 in – 8 ft 2 in) high, during adverse weather conditions approximately 15 nautical miles (28 km) off Bawean Island, Gresik, Java, Indonesia. The crew transferred to the barge M 80-1301 that she was towing. The crew was taken off the barge by the tug Reva III.
Unknown	Vietnam	A barge was sunk when floodwaters in the O Lau River swept her from her moorings and sank at the My Chanh railway bridge. Raised on 14 September.
Virgo Transport 8	Indonesia	The 119-metre (390 ft) ferry capsized and was drifting bottom up in the Java Sea approximately 80 nautical miles (150 km) from Banjarmasin, South Kalimantan. Borneo, Indonesia, in severe weather. Sixteen people, including the captain of the ferry, were rescued by the tanker Mauhau. The majority of the 108 survivors were rescued by the vehicles carrier Haida. The tanker Mauhau and the fishing vessel Cahaya Bahari (all Indonesia) also contributed to the search and rescue effort, while 80 were confirmed dead and 55 were reported missing.

=== 16 September ===
List of shipwrecks: 16 September 2026
Ship	State	Description
Antje	Netherlands	The 79-metre (259 ft) cargo ship suffered a cracked hull on the IJsselmeer between Urk and Lelystad and beached near the Ketel Bridge to prevent sinking. Later pumped out and refloated.

=== 18 September ===
List of shipwrecks: 18 September 2026
Ship	State	Description
Aalfjord	Norway	The 19-metre (62 ft) cargo vessel suffered an engine failure in rough weather, with wave heights of three metres (9.8 ft) and winds reaching 15 m/s (49 ft/s), and drifted ashore on rocks just north of Ryvarden Lighthouse, Sveio in Vestland County, Norway. Pulled off 21 September.
Cape Falcon	Liberia	The 292-metre (958 ft) bulk carrier ran aground off Gladstone, Queensland, Australia. Refloated 24 September.
Zelda	Malta	The 40-metre (130 ft) sailing vessel struck rocks, known as Yassi Ada off Karaada Island in the Aegean Sea, in the Bodrum district of Muğla Province, Turkey, then capsized and partially sank. She was secured to the rocks to prevent sinking further. The crew and passengers were rescued.

=== 19 September ===
List of shipwrecks: 19 September 2026
Ship	State	Description
Unknown	Flag unknown	A suspected drug smuggling boat was destroyed by a U.S. Southern Command air strike in the Caribbean Sea. Four crew were killed.

=== 22 September ===
List of shipwrecks: 22 September 2026
Ship	State	Description
CM-92044-TS	Vietnam	The fishing vessel sank about 24 nautical miles (44 km) (09°07′N 106°27′E) from Trần Đề, Vietnam in the South China Sea. The crew were rescued by CM-08032-TS (Vietnam).

=== 24 September ===
List of shipwrecks: 24 September 2026
Ship	State	Description
Gure Gaskuña	Spain	The 39-metre (128 ft) trawler was docked and under repair in Orio, Gipuzkoa Province, Spain, near the Txurruka esplanade, caught fire and eventually capsized and sank at dock.

=== 25 September ===
List of shipwrecks: 25 September 2026
Ship	State	Description
Blue Carrier 2	Greece	The cargo ship caught fire north of Mykonos and was abandoned by the 29 people on board. They took to two lifeboats and were rescued by a Greek Coastguard patrol boat.
USS Klakring	United States Navy	The decommissioned Oliver Hazard Perry-class frigate was damaged by Standard Missile SM 6 missiles from USS Paul Ignatius (United States Navy), and Naval Strike Missiles and Sea Venom missiles from Royal Navy ships, on the deep sea range off the Outer Hebrides, Scotland. She was then torpedoed and sunk by USS Massachusetts (United States Navy) using a Mk 48 Advanced Capability Torpedo.

=== 26 September ===
List of shipwrecks: 26 September 2026
Ship	State	Description
Tai Tam	Australia	The 51-foot (16 m) yacht was damaged when it struck a whale and abandoned in the Pacific Ocean 250 nautical miles (460 km) north of Norfolk Island, later sinking. The crew was rescued by the cargo ship Sofrana Surville (Malta).

=== 29 September ===
List of shipwrecks: 29 September 2026
Ship	State	Description
Monte Arballu	Spain	The 27-metre (89 ft) tuna fishing vessel sprang a leak and partially sank in shallow water at the Naos cruise ship pier in Arrecife, Canary Islands, Spain, with only the masts and wheelhouse still protruding above water. Salvage is expected.

=== Unknown date ===
List of shipwrecks: Unknown date in September 2026
Ship	State	Description
Dingenis Jan	United Kingdom	The 31.73-metre (104.1 ft) fishing vessel sank sometime in September at Cardingford. Refloated on unknown date and taken to Ballywalter, where it was abandoned at the pier.
IRIS Shahid Roudaki	Islamic Republic of Iran Navy	2026 Iran war: The 149-metre (489 ft) muti-purpose warship was set on fire and sank near the Strait of Hormuz, possibly in a US attack on 1 September 2026, in shallow water with part of the superstructure above water.

== October ==
=== 1 October ===
List of shipwrecks: 1 October 2026
Ship	State	Description
Genesis	United Kingdom	The 35-metre (115 ft) longline fishing vessel ran aground on rocks at the Old Man of Hoy (58°53′N 03°26′W), near Rackwick Bay, Hoy Island, Orkney Islands. Her seventeen crew were rescued by helicopter. She broke up in rough seas on 11 October.

=== 3 October ===
List of shipwrecks: 3 October 2026
Ship	State	Description
John	Italy	The 25-metre (82 ft) yacht caught fire at the Marina di Brindisi, Brindisi, Italy and sank with only part of her bow above water after being moved to the Punta Riso breakwater by tugs.

=== 4 October ===
List of shipwrecks: 4 October 2026
Ship	State	Description
Unknown	Unknown	Over 30 people were killed and dozens missing after two motor boats collided on the Congo River near Lukolela, Democratic Republic of the Congo.
Unknown	Unknown	A narco boat was destroyed by the US Southern Command in the Caribbean Sea. Four crew were killed.

=== 5 October ===
List of shipwrecks: 5 October 2026
Ship	State	Description
Royad Mammadov	St. Kitts and Nevis	Russian invasion of Ukraine: The 139.55-metre (457.8 ft) cargo ship was sunk by Russian drones some 20 miles (32 km) off Romania in the Black Sea. 11 crew members were rescued by Romanian vessels and helicopters, 2 others were killed.

=== 6 October ===
List of shipwrecks: 6 October 2026
Ship	State	Description
Alfa Watan	Togo	Russian invasion of Ukraine: The 83.57-metre (274.2 ft) cargo ship was sunk by drones 70 nautical miles (130 km) off Bulgaria in the Black Sea. Its crew was unaccounted for.
Westerland	Fiji	The out-of-service 58-metre (190 ft) ferry was towed from off Mosquito Island, Suva harbour in Lami Bay, Fiji and scuttled offshore. She had been decommissioned and abandoned in 2021.

=== 7 October ===
List of shipwrecks: 7 October 2026
Ship	State	Description
Khatulistiwa 8	Indonesia	The 70-metre (230 ft) cargo ship was sunk in a collision with a barge approximately nine nautical miles (17 km) from the PT Semen Indonesia (SIG) Tuban Special Terminal in Tuban, Java, in the Java Sea (06°33′S 112°59′E). Seventeen crew were rescued, one was reported missing.

=== 8 October ===
List of shipwrecks: 8 October 2026
Ship	State	Description
José El Tuno	Spain	The 9.7-metre (32 ft) fishing boat suffered engine failure and water ingress and was abandoned approximately 140 miles (230 km) southwest of El Hierro, Canary Islands, Spain. Her three crew were rescued.

=== 9 October ===
List of shipwrecks: 9 October 2026
Ship	State	Description
Sunny Faith	Bahamas	The 130-metre (430 ft) cargo ship broke lose from her mooring and went adrift in stormy weather amid wind speeds of up to 27 m/s (89 ft/s), and finally ran aground close to Yantarni in the Kaliningrad Region, Russia.
Unnamed	Flag unknown	A migrant boat capsized off Djibouti. At least 139 migrants, including 15 children, died out of 305 people on board, with 84 reported missing.
Unknown	Unknown	A jack up platform was wrecked by storm winds in the Baltic Sea off Svetlogorsk in Kaliningrad Oblast, Russia. The wreck was later cast ashore by the storm.

=== 11 October ===
List of shipwrecks: 11 October 2026
Ship	State	Description
Hai Hamburg	Germany	The 14-metre (46 ft) sailboat ran aground in a sandy area that becomes exposed at low tide, near the Forte da Ínsua, a fortification belonging to the town of Caminha, on a small island right at the mouth of the Minho River, Portugal.
Ty Noem	France	The trawler sank at anchor in the port of Erquy, (Côtes-d'Armor), France. Refloated the next day.

=== 12 October ===
List of shipwrecks: 12 October 2026
Ship	State	Description
HS Dignity	Guinea Bissau	Russian invasion of Ukraine: The 124-metre (407 ft) cargo ship was sunk by drones in the Black Sea, about 17 nautical miles (31 km) off Krapets, Dobrich Province, Bulgaria (43°32′N 28°59′E) east of Cape Shabla. Five crew were rescued and 11 crew were unaccounted for.
Vali	Chile	The 58-metre (190 ft) cargo ship ran aground after striking rocks, while providing support to the Serrano fish farm in the Isla Verdugo area, approximately 18 nautical miles (33 km) southeast of Melinka in the Aysén Region, Chile sinking partially submerged. Fourteen crew members were evacuated by the motor launch Don Facundo-THN-3125 (Chile). Salvage is expected.

=== 14 October ===
List of shipwrecks: 14 October 2026
Ship	State	Description
Cape Dao	Antigua and Barbuda	2026 Iran war:The 289-metre (948 ft) cargo ship sank in the Strait of Hormuz after an attack that killed her captain on 23 September.
GFS Pride	Singapore	2026 Iran war: The 221-metre (725 ft) cargo ship sank in the Strait of Hormuz one mile (1.6 km) mile east of Ras Makhbuq, four nautical miles (7.4 km) northwest of Ras al-Sheikh Masud off Oman's Musandam Peninsula after being hit in an Iranian attack, or struck a naval mine.
Grace Romavictor	Liberia	The 183-metre (600 ft) tanker ship ran aground on the coast of Çilingöz Nature Park during a storm off Çatalca, Istanbul Province, Turkey after losing her tow. She had been damaged by drones in the Black Sea near Novorossiysk, Russia and had been adrift.

=== 15 October ===
List of shipwrecks: 15 October 2026
Ship	State	Description
Banda	Liberia	The 238-metre (781 ft) tanker was driven aground by high winds in the Black Sea off Sarıyer Kısırkaya, Sariyer district, Istanbul Province, Turkey. She had been damaged by drones in the Black Sea on 14 July and 2 September. Refloated 20 October.
Espírito Santo Express	Singapore	The container ship suffered an onboard explosion and caught fire in the Atlantic Ocean 975 nautical miles (1,806 km) north west of Tristan da Cunha. Her 25 crew were rescued. She was on a voyage from Singapore to Santos, Brazil.
Sjøblomsten	Norway	The uncrewed 20-metre (66 ft) tourist craft broke loose from her moorings in Nyksund, Norway and grounded at the breakwater. Salvaged on 17 October.

=== 16 October ===
List of shipwrecks: 16 October 2026
Ship	State	Description
Doménica L	Ecuador	The 35-metre (115 ft) fishing vessel was swamped by a large wave causing the vessel to lose stability, capsize, and sink about 34 miles (55 km) from Puntilla de Santa Elena. Six crew were rescued, one died, and 13 others were reported missing.
Unknown	Unknown	An unknown vessel sprang a leak and sank approximately 140 miles (230 km) west of Ensenada, Mexico in the Pacific Ocean in an area normally used in illegal maritime smuggling operations. Of the 27 reported in the water, 16 were rescued.

=== 17 October ===
List of shipwrecks: 17 October 2026
Ship	State	Description
High Roller III	Canada	The 15-metre (49 ft) fishing boat sprung a leak and was abandoned in Trinity Bay, Newfoundland, in deteriorating weather. She was taken under tow by CCGS John Cabot (Canadian Coast Guard). She had to be cut loose and drifted onto the rocks near Bay de Verde, Newfoundland. Refloated on 20 October and scrapped on 26–27 October 2026.

=== 19 October ===
List of shipwrecks: 19 October 2026
Ship	State	Description
Able	Palau	Russian invasion of Ukraine: The 110-metre (360 ft) cargo ship sank in the Black Sea off Turkey after being damaged by drones on 6 October in Bulgaria's exclusive economic zone about 70 nautical miles (130 km) from Byala, Varna Province.
Uglich	Russia	The 38-metre (125 ft) survey vessel went adrift in stormy weather off Anapa and went aground near Dzhemete Beach, Krasnodar Territory, Russia in high winds and waves.

=== 20 October ===
List of shipwrecks: 20 October 2026
Ship	State	Description
Inyalazi	South Africa	The 30-metre (98 ft) tugboat sank partially submerged at her mooring in Durban, South Africa.
Jesus Heart	unknown	The dhow was sunk in a collision with a fishing vessel about 20 nautical miles (37 km) off Beypore, India. The crew was rescued by the tugboat Resco 4 (India).
KMP Batumandi	Indonesia	The 110-metre (360 ft) ferry caught fire in the Sunda Strait, near the island of Merak Besar and burned out. There were 420 passengers on board, consisting of 393 passengers in vehicles and 27 pedestrian passengers, which were all rescued by KMP Royce 1 (Indonesia). The ferry capsized and sank the next day near the ASDP Merak Port in Cilegon City, Banten Province, Java, Indonesia.

=== 21 October ===
List of shipwrecks: 21 October 2026
Ship	State	Description
Maranatha	Germany	The 27-metre (89 ft), 120-ton brigantine sank partially submerged in the lower River Warnow in Rostock, Germany. Lifted on 19 November 2026.

=== 24 October ===
List of shipwrecks: 24 October 2026
Ship	State	Description
Prospector 5	Vanuatu	The jackup rig sank southeast of Mayumba, Gabon in the Atlantic Ocean. 110 crew were rescued, 7 died.

=== 25 October ===
List of shipwrecks: 25 October 2026
Ship	State	Description
Rambling Rose	United Kingdom	The 18-metre (59 ft) fishing trawler was pushed ashore by an exceptionally high tide and gale force wind of the storm Storm Boelo (Manja).

=== 26 October ===
List of shipwrecks: 26 October 2026
Ship	State	Description
Johanna Egelina	Netherlands	The 38-metre (125 ft) passenger sail vessel struck a breakwater in the Wadden Sea near Kornwerderza and became stuck. The ship was pulled free but was badly leaking and was run aground to prevent sinking. Refloated again and taken ashore on a lift.
Sigma Pearl	Marshall Islands	The 180-metre (590 ft) cargo ship ran aground off Machilipatnam, Andhra Pradesh, India in the Bay of Bengal (16°21′N 81°49′E). Still aground as of 29 October.

=== 28 October ===
List of shipwrecks: 28 October 2026
Ship	State	Description
Contship Jet	Liberia	Russian invasion of Ukraine: The 158-metre (518 ft) cargo ship was hit by three sea drones approximately 21 nautical miles (39 km) off Shabla, 16 kilometres (9.9 mi) off Cape Kaliakra around Noon. She sank after drifting south before midnight. Her 18 crew were safe.

=== 29 October ===
List of shipwrecks: 29 October 2026
Ship	State	Description
Khoryv	Comoros	Russian invasion of Ukraine: The 119-metre (390 ft) cargo ship was attacked by Russian drones and set on fire about 13 nautical miles (24 km) from Constanța, outside Romania's territorial waters, but close to their boundary, in the Black Sea on 23 October. She capsized and started sinking, bottom up adrift. Nine crew were rescued by the offshore supply ship Sartor (Norway). One person was killed and three reported missing. The stern of the vessel sank as of 29 October and was resting on the seabed at a depth of about 70 m (230 ft) in the area between Tyulenovo and Cape Shabla, with the bow still visible in an inverted position. She is expected to be scuttled by the corvette Reshitelny (Bulgarian Navy).

=== 30 October ===
List of shipwrecks: 30 October 2026
Ship	State	Description
Antepli	Tanzania	The 82-metre (269 ft) cargo ship suffered water ingress and started sinking about 90 nautical miles (170 km) west of Paphos, Cyprus in the Mediterranean Sea. The crew was rescued by the container ship Hannah III (Panama).

=== 31 October ===
List of shipwrecks: 31 October 2026
Ship	State	Description
Bellone	Curacao	The laid up 100-metre (330 ft) ferry was towed out of Port-Louis, Mauritius, and scuttled.
La Lupita	Venezuela	The abandoned or derelict 23-metre (75 ft) fishing vessel drifted aground at Paraguaipoa, Guajira municipality, Zulia state, Venezuela.

== November ==
=== 2 November ===
List of shipwrecks: 2 November 2026
Ship	State	Description
Selat Storm	Panama	2026 Iran war: The 58-metre (190 ft) offshore tugboat reportedly sank after being hit by an unknown projectile in the Strait of Hormuz, northwest of the Musandam Peninsula.

=== 2 November ===
List of shipwrecks: 2 November 2026
Ship	State	Description
AS Dream	Tanzania	The cargo ship sank in the Mediterranean Sea 90 nautical miles (170 km) west of Cyprus. Her ten crew were rescued by MSC Hannah III (Panama).
Océans	France	The 18-metre (59 ft) Orma-class sail racing boat capsized in the Atlantic Ocean at 49°38′N 13°52′W while racing in the Vintage Multi category in the Route du Rhum-Destination Guadeloupe. The vessel's captain was rescued by the container ship Maersk Columbus (United States).

=== 4 November ===
List of shipwrecks: 4 November 2026
Ship	State	Description
Infanta Elena	Spanish Navy	The decommissioned Descubierta-class corvette was torpedoed and sunk in a Sink-Ex 26 by the submarine Isaac Peral (Spanish Navy) with a DM2A4 heavyweight torpedo off the Canary Islands.
Maxi Banque Populaire XI	France	The 32-metre (105 ft) sail racing trimaran capsized in the Atlantic Ocean at 42°49′N 42°22′W while racing in the Route du Rhum, roughly 550 nautical miles (1,020 km) northwest of the Azores.

=== 6 November ===
List of shipwrecks: 6 November 2026
Ship	State	Description
Byb Othello	St. Kitts and Nevis	The 97-metre (318 ft) cargo ship suffered a mechanical failure and ran aground on rocks off the Istanbul Anadolu Lighthouse in severe weather and waves. All 13 crew were rescued by breeches buoy system.

=== 7 November ===
List of shipwrecks: 7 November 2026
Ship	State	Description
Ekinox-Rhétorès	France	The 12-metre (39 ft) 40-class sail racing boat sprung a leak and sank in waves of 7 metres (23 ft) height and 40-knot (74 km/h) winds west of the Azores in the Atlantic Ocean while racing in the Route du Rhum-Destination Guadeloupe. The vessel's captain was rescued by fellow racing sail boat Plastic Odyssey.

=== 9 November ===
List of shipwrecks: 9 November 2026
Ship	State	Description
Jia Cheng 799	China	The 109-metre (358 ft) cargo ship sprung a leak and sank roughly 20 nautical miles (37 km) northeast of Binhai Port in Yancheng City, Jiangsu Province, China in the East China Sea, or southern Yellow Sea, in harsh weather. All 14 crew were rescued.
VTA Neptune	Vietnam	The 150.52-metre (493.8 ft) cargo ship encountered strong winds, while docking for loading at the Chan May-Lang County in Hue City, went adrift and ran aground about 2.75 nautical miles (5.09 km) southwest of buoy number 0 in the Chan May Seaway on the beach of the Canh Duong Village (16°20′N 107°57′E) in Chan May, Vietnam.

=== 10 November ===
List of shipwrecks: 10 November 2026
Ship	State	Description
LCT 8	Philippines	The 86-metre (282 ft) landing craft, tank sank in shallow water with her superstructure above water at Carrascal, Surigao Del Sur, Mindanao, the Philippines.
Tong Cheng 301	Panama	The 123.74-metre (406.0 ft) cargo ship was driven on to a sand bar by high waves, heavy rain and rough seas off Quảng Ngãi, Vietnam.

=== 11 November ===
List of shipwrecks: 11 November 2026
Ship	State	Description
United States	United States	The out-of-service 990-foot (302-metre) ocean liner was scuttled in the Gulf of Mexico approximately 22 nautical miles (41 km; 25 mi) southwest of Destin-Fort Walton Beach, Florida, and 32 nautical miles (59 km; 37 mi) southeast of Pensacola Pass as an artificial reef.
Venus 14	Thailand	The 290-metre (951-foot) tanker sank in the Gulf of Thailand off Sattahip. She went down about 27 nautical miles (50 km) from the entrance of the channel leading to the Sattahip Naval Base. One crewman was rescued by the fishing vessel Phon Nuchit 5, and five others were reported missing. During the salvage attempt she was towed to a position approximately 15 nautical miles (28 km) east of Pak Nam Pran.

=== 13 November ===
List of shipwrecks: 13 November 2026
Ship	State	Description
American Heritage	United States	2026 New Orleans ship collision: The 90-metre (295-foot) paddle river cruise ship was struck by the tanker Atlantic Asphalt (Marshall Islands) causing her to roll on her port side and sink in 7.6-metre (25 ft) of water at dock partially submerged in the Mississippi River at the New Orleans Convention Center, Louisiana.

=== 14 November ===
List of shipwrecks: 14 November 2026
Ship	State	Description
Ma Gwen’Do	France	The 12-metre (39 ft) crab fishing vessel sank at the Gambetta quay in Boulogne-sur-Mer, France.

=== 16 November ===
List of shipwrecks: 16 November 2026
Ship	State	Description
Al Fatah	Qatar	The 10-metre (33 ft) fishing vessel sank near the Bab el-Mandeb Strait near Berbera in the Woqooyi Galbeed Region, Somaliland. Six crew were rescued by the livestock carrier Adel 2, and two others were reported missing and presumed dead. Most likely the cargo ship is the one that sank.
Al Fatah	India	The 82-metre (269 ft) cargo ship sank near the Bab el-Mandeb Strait near Berbera in the Woqooyi Galbeed Region, Somaliland. Two (probably 24) crew were rescued and one reported missing and presumed dead.
Algoma Equinox	Canada	The 224-metre (735 ft) cargo ship ran aground near Lanoraie, (Contrecoeur), Quebec, Canada. Pulled off 20 November 2026.
Betul 8	Somalia	Russian invasion of Ukraine: The 74-metre (243 ft) cargo ship capsized and sank after being struck by two drones in the Black Sea about 40 nautical miles (74 km) southeast of Cape Kaliakra, Bulgaria. The crew was rescued.
Danny	Belgium	The 67-metre (220 ft) barge ran aground off the ferry port in Terneuzen (51°20′N 03°50′E). The vessel was refloated the next day.
Mariam M	Tanzania	Russian invasion of Ukraine: The abandoned 96-metre (315 ft) cargo ship ran aground on the beach between Cape Midia and Vadu, Romania after she was hit by a Russian drone in the Bystre Channel, in the Danube Delta on 17 September. Her captain and a pilot were killed, 13 crew were wounded, or one was killed and three wounded.

=== 17 November ===
List of shipwrecks: 17 November 2026
Ship	State	Description
Gas Husky	Liberia	Russian invasion of Ukraine: The 119-metre (390 ft) propane tanker was sunk after being struck by four drones in the Black Sea approximately 50 nautical miles (93 km) off Byala, 55 nautical miles (102 km) southeast of Varna, Bulgaria. The crew was rescued by a Cougar helicopter.
Fast Jef	Belgium	The 88-metre (289 ft) cargo ship ran aground on the coast of County Wexford, Ireland, off Roney Point (52°36′N 06°12′W) in Force 7–8 south-westerly winds, a 2.5-metre (8 ft 2 in) swell and heavy rain squalls. All six crew members were recovered by helicopter.
Nova Orion	Cuba	The 74-metre (243 ft) ro-ro cargo ship ran aground approximately 300 m (980 ft) off the Playa Costámbar, Puerto Plata, Dominican Republic (19°49′N 70°43′W) in adverse weather conditions and strong waves.

=== 18 November ===
List of shipwrecks: Unknown date in November 2026
Ship	State	Description
Mwanza	Tanzania	The ferry ran into the Bismarck Rock, Lake Victoria.

=== 20 November ===
List of shipwrecks: 20 November 2026
Ship	State	Description
Miro G	Malta	The 169-metre (554 ft) cargo ship ran aground at the Landes department in Nouvelle-Aquitaine coast, near the town of Lit-et-Mixe (44°02′N 01°21′W) after dragging anchor in 48-knot (89 km/h) winds. The crew was rescued by a French Air Force Raffut helicopter.

== 22 November ==
List of shipwrecks: 22 November 2026
Ship	State	Description
Merkury	Russian Navy	Russo-Ukrainian war: The Steregushchiy-class corvette was destroyed by an onboard explosion at Benghazi, Libya.

== Unknown date ==
List of shipwrecks: Unknown date 2026
Ship	State	Description
Galaxy Leader	Bahamas	Gaza war: The vehicle carrier, captured by Houthi rebels in the Red Sea in 2023, was hit in an Israeli air strike in port at Ras Isa, Yemen in 2025. It sank partially submerged sometime before 30 April 2026.
