= List of deputy prime ministers of Northern Cyprus =

This is a chronological list of the deputy prime ministers of Northern Cyprus. A new number is allocated to each new deputy prime minister.

== List of deputy prime ministers of Northern Cyprus (1975–present) ==
=== Deputy prime ministers of the Turkish Federated State of Cyprus (1975–1983) ===
This list gives all deputy prime ministers after the founding of the Turkish Federated State of Cyprus, which was intended as an autonomous part of Cyprus, but was rejected by the government of the Republic of Cyprus.

Name	Term of office		Political party at the time of appointment	Other ministerial offices
Vedat Çelik	5 July 1976	7 July 1977	National Unity Party	Minister of Defence and Foreign Affairs

=== Deputy prime ministers of the Turkish Republic of Northern Cyprus (1983–present) ===
This list gives all deputy prime ministers after Northern Cyprus' unilateral declaration of independence in 1983, which followed after the refusal of the government of the Republic of Cyprus to recognize the Turkish Federated State of Cyprus.

Name	Term of office		Political party and position at the time of appointment	Other ministerial offices
Özker Özgür	1 January 1994	11 December 1995	Leader of the Republican Turkish Party	Minister of State
Mehmet Ali Talat	11 December 1995	16 August 1996	Leader of the Republican Turkish Party	Minister of State
Serdar Denktaş	16 August 1996	30 December 1998	Leader of the Democratic Party	Minister of State; Minister of Labour and Settlement (acting)
Mustafa Akıncı	30 December 1998	8 June 2001	Leader of the Communal Liberation Party	Minister of Tourism
Salih Coşar	8 June 2001	28 February 2003	Leader of the Democratic Party	Minister of State Responsible for Economy
Serdar Denktaş	28 February 2003	13 July 2004	Leader of the Democratic Party	Minister of State Responsible for Tourism
Serdar Denktaş	13 July 2004	25 September 2006	Leader of the Democratic Party	Minister of Foreign Affairs; Prime Minister (acting)
Turgay Avcı	25 September 2006	5 May 2009	Leader of the Freedom and Reform Party	Minister of Foreign Affairs
Office not in use		5 May 2009 – 2 September 2013		—N/a
Serdar Denktaş	2 September 2013	22 May 2015	Leader of the Democratic Party-National Forces	Minister of Economy, Tourism, Culture and Sport; Minister of National Education (acting)
Hasan Taçoy (acting)	22 May 2015	29 May 2015	Secretary General of the Democratic Party-National Forces	Minister of Transport and Public Works; Minister of Economy, Tourism, Culture and Sport (acting)
Menteş Gündüz	29 May 2015	16 July 2015	Deputy Secretary General of the Democratic Party-National Forces	Minister of Economy, Tourism, Culture and Sport
Office not in use		16 July 2015 – 16 April 2016		—N/a
Serdar Denktaş	16 April 2016	2 February 2018	Leader of the Democratic Party	Minister of Finance; Minister of National Education and Culture (acting)
Kudret Özersay	2 February 2018	9 December 2020	Leader of the People's Party	Minister of Foreign Affairs
Erhan Arıklı	9 December 2020	5 November 2021	Leader of the Rebirth Party	Minister of Economy and Energy
Office not in use		5 November 2021 – 8 November 2021		—N/a
Fikri Ataoğlu	8 November 2021	Present	Leader of the Democratic Party	Minister of Tourism and Environment

== See also ==
- Deputy Prime Minister of Northern Cyprus
