= 2026 Lake Kariba ferry accident =

Maritime disaster in Zimbabwe

Lake Kariba ferry accident
- Location within Zimbabwe Location within Africa
- Date: 11 August 2026
- Time: 14:00 (CAT, UTC+2)
- Location: Eastern Lake Kariba, Zimbabwe; 16°47′42″S 28°16′34″E
- Deaths: 97+

On 11 August 2026, the passenger ferry Mbuya Nehanda capsized on Lake Kariba in Zimbabwe. At least 97 people died, making it the deadliest boat disaster in the country's history. The ferry, which was operated by Zimbabwe's state-run Rural Infrastructure Development Agency, provided a transport link between Kariba and the rural community of Chalala. It was carrying at least 114 adults, 5 crew members and an unspecified number of children, despite an authorised passenger capacity of 90; some reports placed the total number aboard at as many as 153.

Passengers had expressed concerns about deteriorating weather before departure, and survivors later said that requests to turn back or seek shelter were ignored or rejected by the crew. About 30 minutes into the journey, waves began washing over the vessel, which was operating with only one functioning engine. Water accumulated aboard, the bilge pump became submerged and the remaining engine eventually stopped, after which the ferry turned broadside to the waves and capsized. President Emmerson Mnangagwa declared a state of disaster and acknowledged deficiencies in Zimbabwe's maritime capabilities. The loss of the ferry disrupted transport and trade in communities along the Chalala route, and the government pledged to provide a replacement vessel and rehabilitate an alternative road connection.

== Background ==
The Mbuya Nehanda was an aging ferry that had reportedly been donated to the Zimbabwean government in 1985. It was named for the 19th-century martyred svikiro (spirit medium) Nehanda Charwe Nyakasikana. It ran on Lake Kariba, which runs along the border between Zimbabwe and Zambia and is the world's largest artificial lake by volume. The ferry, operated by Zimbabwe's Rural Infrastructure Development Agency, provided a regular transport link from Kariba town down the lake to Chalala, a relatively isolated community approximately 50 kilometres (30 mi) away in rural Kariba district. By road, Chalala lies more than 400 kilometres (250 mi) from Kariba. At the time of the accident, the ferry was running with only one functioning engine.

== Capsize ==
The accident took place on 11 August 2026. Survivors said the strong wind had alarmed passengers before departure, particularly after a box containing electrical equipment was blown into the water at the harbour. According to wind readings reported by The Herald, conditions strengthened during the day as the wind turned from west to southwest, reaching about 29 km/h (18 mph), by 2 p.m. The strengthening southwesterly wind reportedly generated the rough lake conditions locally known as the "Binga Wave." Investigations indicate that the vessel was overloaded at the time of departure, carrying at least 114 adults, five crew members, and an unspecified number of children despite an authorised capacity of 90. Other reports put the number of people on board at up to 153.

Approximately 30 minutes after departure, waves began washing over the vessel and water accumulated inside it. Survivors later said that they asked the captain to turn around or seek shelter at a nearby island, but he refused. Water subsequently entered the engine compartment and submerged the vessel's bilge pump, preventing it from removing the incoming water. As the ferry began to list, the captain instructed passengers to move to one side in an attempt to correct the list.

According to survivor and witness accounts, passengers had expressed concern about the worsening conditions, but the captain maintained the voyage. A witness said that a wave may have caused the ferry's engines to switch off. The vessel subsequently capsized after encountering strong waves near Long Island. Some passengers struggled to use life jackets or were unable to locate them during the capsizing.

Some of the survivors who lacked life jackets remained afloat by holding onto floating objects, while others climbed onto the overturned hull. Of the five crew members aboard, two survived. A rescue boat from Tashinga, together with Zimbabwe Parks and Wildlife Management Authority (Zimparks) personnel and local boat operators, reached the scene at approximately 2 p.m. and rescued 77 people from the water and from the overturned vessel.

As of 20 August, the number of confirmed fatalities stands at 97, up from 94 on 19 August. It is the deadliest transport disaster in Zimbabwe's history.

== Aftermath ==
President Emmerson Mnangagwa declared the Lake Kariba ferry accident a national disaster. He ordered government agencies to mobilise resources to assist victims and accelerate recovery efforts. In a condolence message, Mnangagwa said the tragedy had "exposed serious deficiencies in our maritime capabilities which we have to address immediately so that our places of recreation do not become death traps to the innocent." He directed all agencies associated with maritime safety, including specialised units in the security forces, to take an active role in remedial interventions.

On 13 August, a memorial service was held at Nyamhunga Stadium in Kariba. Dozens of mourners, including cabinet ministers, gathered at the stadium. Coffins of recovered victims were laid out in the middle of the field under tents.

South African president Cyril Ramaphosa expressed condolences to the government and people of Zimbabwe, offered his sympathies to the victims' families and survivors, and paid tribute to the emergency services involved in the search and recovery operation. The government of Egypt also expressed "deepest condolences" in an official statement.

The ferry had been the principal transport link between urban Kariba and rural communities along the Chalala route, leaving transport and trade disrupted. Fishing communities reported spoilage of catches because ice and transport to markets were no longer available, while some residents were unable to travel to attend relatives' funerals. The Zimbabwean government pledged on 13 August to provide a replacement vessel and ordered the rehabilitation of an impassable road linking Kariba, Siakobvu and Chalala.

== See also ==
- Lake Kariba
- Kariba, Zimbabwe
- List of shipwrecks in 2026
- List of maritime disasters
