= Split Channel =

Waterway in the Adriatic Sea

Coordinates: 43°26′35″N 16°17′17″E

- Interactive map of Split Channel

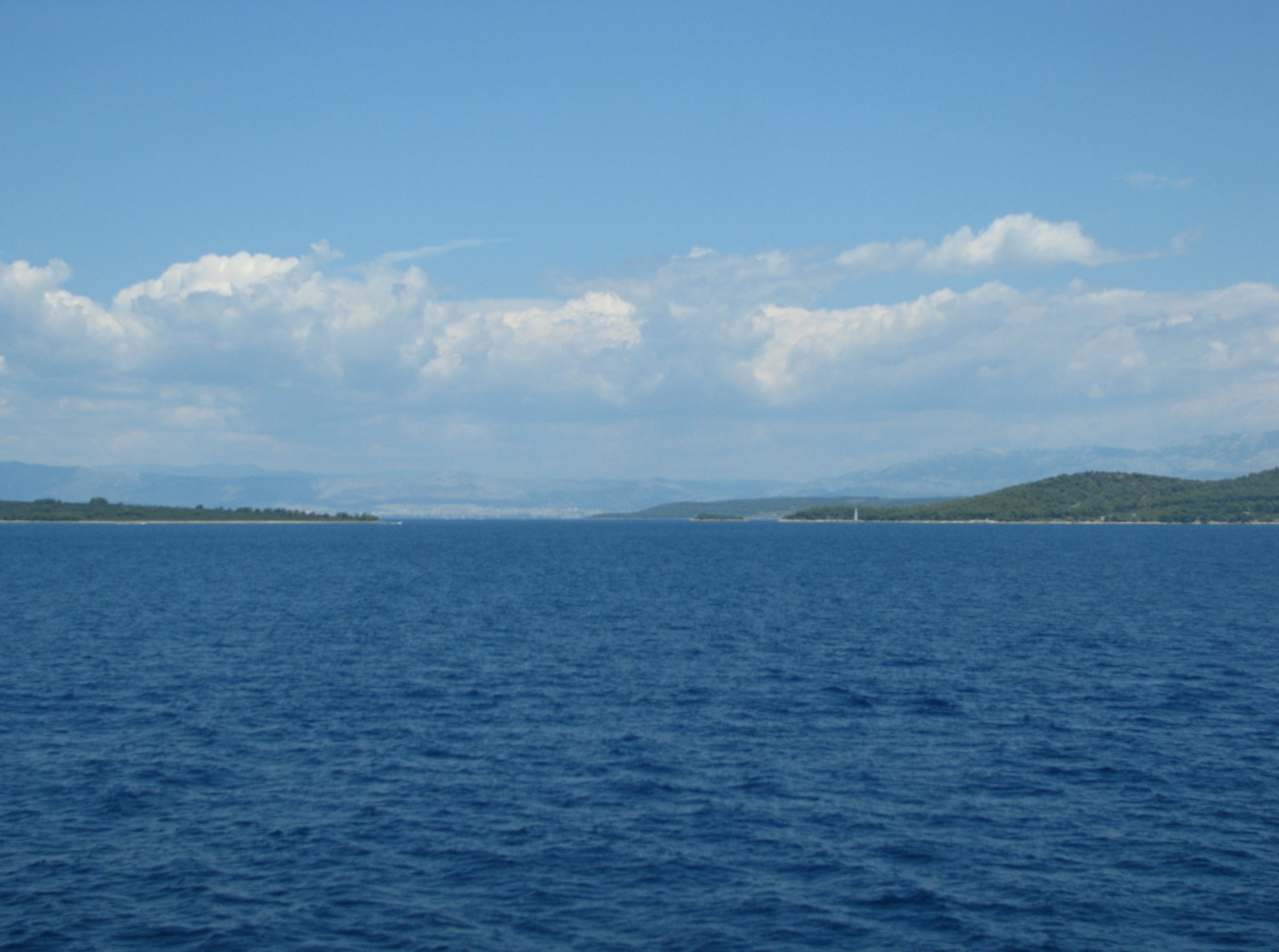
The Split Gates. Split itself is visible on the mainland in the background.

The Split Channel (Croatian: Splitski kanal), is a channel in the Adriatic Sea, off the coast of mainland Dalmatia, defined by the southern shores of the island of Čiovo, the northern shores of the island of Šolta and the western shores of the island of Brač. It is accessible from the open sea through the Drvenik Channel or Šolta Channel from the west, and through the Split Gates (Splitska vrata) straits—narrow passage between Šolta and Brač to the south of the Split Channel. To the east, the Split Channel is connected to the Brač Channel. All the access routes accommodate capesize ships.

The Split Channel and the Split Gates, named after the nearby city of Split, are the most direct route from the international waters to the Port of Split. In the Split Gates lies Mrduja island, an islet notable for being the turning point of the local Mrduja Regatta, an annual sailboat competition.

On the Brač side lies the deep Milna bay and the village of Milna. On the Šolta side of the channel, there are no villages in the immediate vicinity.

== See also ==
- Split
- Split Gates
- Dalmatia
- Brač
- Šolta
- Čiovo
