= Mayuree Naree (2007) =

Bulk carrier

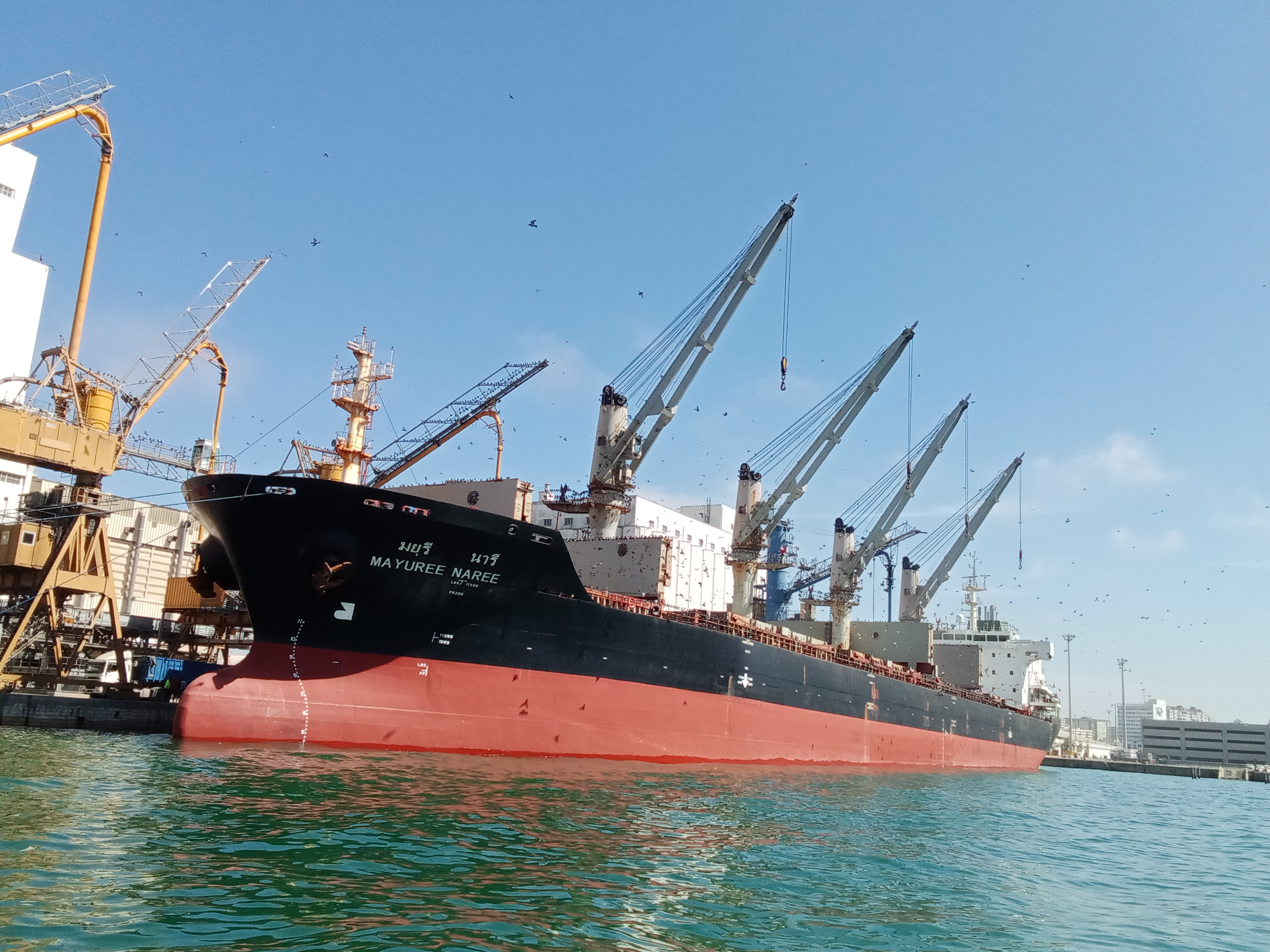
- MV Mayuree Naree at Casablanca in 2023

History
- Name: Good Princess (2008–2012); Mayuree Naree (2012–present)
- Owner: Goodearth Maritime (2008–2012); Precious Shipping (2012–present)
- Port of registry: Mumbai, India (2008–2012); Bangkok, Thailand (2012–present)
- Ordered: May 2004
- Builder: Hindustan Shipyard (Visakhapatnam, India)
- Cost: US$20 million
- Yard number: 11116
- Laid down: 18 January 2006
- Launched: 16 May 2007
- Completed: 23 January 2008
- Identification: IMO number: 9323649; MMSI number: 567461000; Call sign: HSGM
- Status: Abandoned after attack near the Strait of Hormuz on 11 March 2026

General characteristics
- Class & type: IRClass;Trader-class bulk carrier
- Tonnage: 19,891 GT; 10,297 NT; 30,193 DWT
- Displacement: 38,154 tonnes (37,551 long tons)
- Length: 178.7 m (586 ft)
- Beam: 28 m (92 ft)
- Draught: 9.75 m (32.0 ft)
- Installed power: MAN B&W 6S42MC (6,480 kW)
- Propulsion: Single shaft; fixed pitch propeller
- Speed: 14.3 knots (26.5 km/h; 16.5 mph)
- Capacity: 40,975 m^{3} (1,447,000 cu ft) in five cargo holds
- Crew: 27

MV Mayuree Naree is a Thailand-flagged bulk carrier built in India as Good Princess in 2008. Since 2012 the vessel has been owned and operated by the Thai shipping company Precious Shipping.

On 11 March 2026, the vessel was struck by Iranian projectiles near the Strait of Hormuz, causing a fire and forcing most of the crew to abandon ship. Nearly a month later on 8 April, three crew members of the vessel were confirmed to have died.

== Description ==
Mayuree Naree is a double-hulled, single-deck, self-trimming^{A} bulk carrier built in 2008 by Hindustan Shipyard in Visakhapatnam, India as Good Princess to Indian Register of Shipping class. It is designed to transport dry bulk cargo such as grain, coal, and iron ore in five cargo holds with a total capacity of 40,975 cubic metres (1,447,000 cu ft). For cargo handling, the ship has four 30-tonne (30-long-ton; 33-short-ton) cranes.

It has an overall length of 178.7 metres (586 ft) and a beam of 28 metres (92 ft) metres, and fully laden draws 9.75 metres (32.0 ft) of water with a displacement of 38,154 tonnes (37,551 long tons). Its gross tonnage is 30,193; net tonnage 10,297; and deadweight tonnage 30,193 tonnes.

The ship is propelled by a single fixed-pitch propeller driven by a six-cylinder MAN B&W 6S42MC two-stroke low-speed crosshead diesel engine, with a maximum continuous rating of 6,480 kW (8,690 hp). Its service speed is 14.3 knots (26.5 km/h; 16.5 mph).

== Career ==
The ship is one of four Trader-class bulk carriers originally built for Goodearth Maritime of Chennai, India. It was laid down at Hindustan Shipyard in Visakhapatnam, India on 18 January 2006, launched on 16 May 2007 as Good Princess, and completed on 23 January 2008.

In 2012, Good Princess was sold to Precious Shipping of Bangkok, renamed Mayuree Naree, and reflagged from India to Thailand.

=== Attack near the Strait of Hormuz ===
On 11 March 2026, Mayuree Naree was struck by two projectiles while sailing near the Strait of Hormuz, one of several vessels struck during the Strait of Hormuz crisis. The vessel had departed Khalifa Port in the United Arab Emirates and was en route to Kandla Port in Gujarat, India.

According to the Royal Thai Navy, the attack occurred at about 11:10 a.m. Thailand time shortly after the vessel transited the strait. Two projectiles struck the ship above the waterline, damaging the stern and the engine room and causing a fire on board. All 23 crew members aboard the vessel were Thai nationals. Twenty crew members abandoned ship in liferafts and were rescued by the Royal Navy of Oman, who brought them ashore at Khasab, Oman. Three crew members were reported missing and believed to be trapped in the engine room following the explosions. The vessel was sailing in ballast at the time of the attack, meaning it was not carrying cargo. The ship was reported to have sustained the heaviest damage among several vessels targeted in the region that day.

Iran's Islamic Revolutionary Guard Corps Navy later claimed responsibility for the attack. Its naval commander, Alireza Tangsiri, said in a social media post that the vessel had ignored warnings issued by Iranian forces while passing through the area. The attack occurred amid escalating conflict in the region and a series of incidents targeting shipping in and around the Strait of Hormuz, one of the world's most important maritime chokepoints for oil and natural gas transportation.

She drifted ashore near the village of Ramchah on Qeshm Island in the Strait of Hormuz on 27 March. On 8 April, Thai Foreign Minister Sihasak Phuangketkeow confirmed during a press conference that three crew members of the vessel had died.

== Notes ==
A.Self-trimming: designed so that loose bulk cargo (e.g. coal, grain) flows naturally as it is loaded, leveling itself out.
