= Mrduja Regatta =

Annual regatta in Split, Croatia

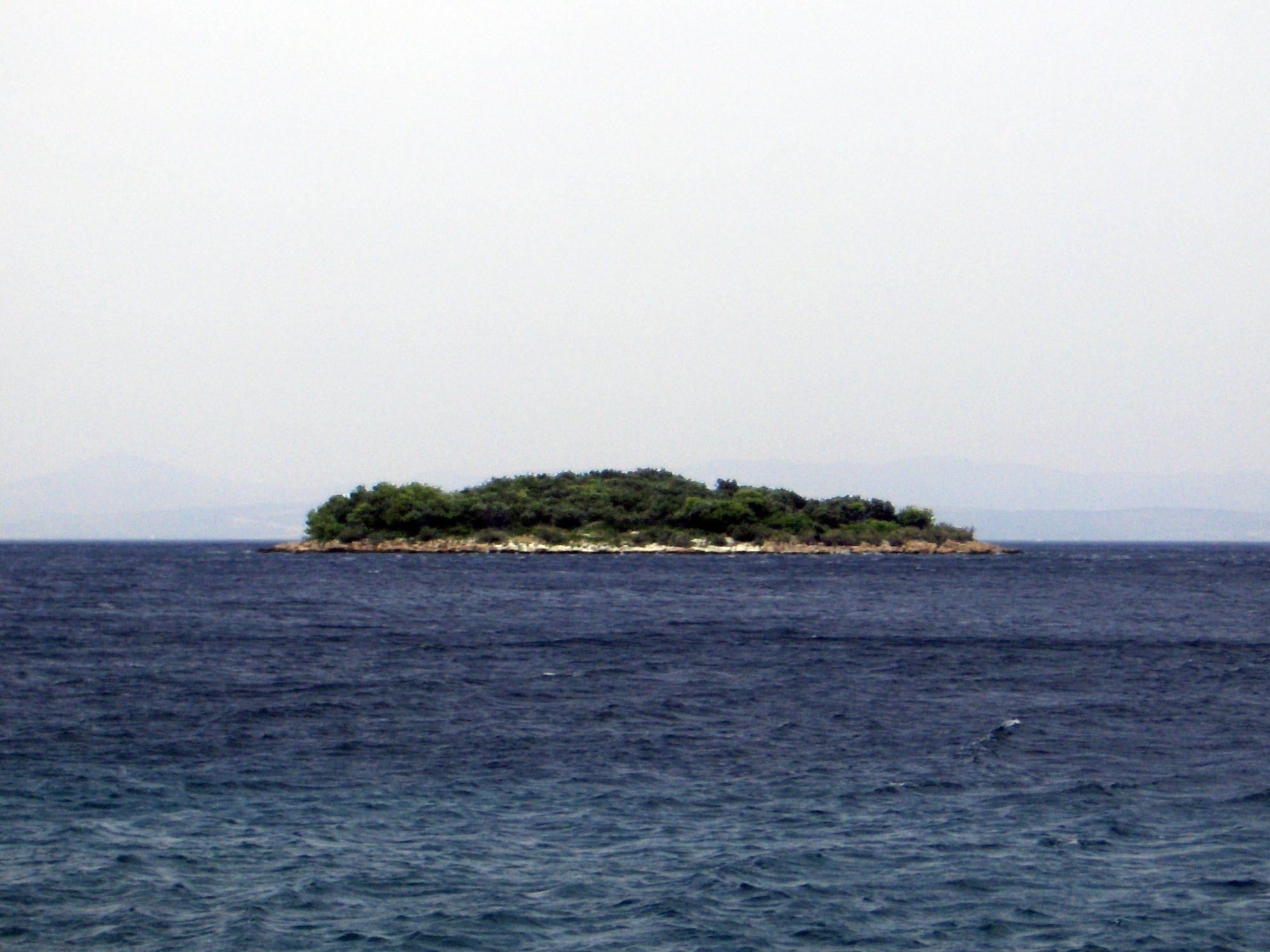
Mrduja from Cape Zaglav

The Mrduja Regatta (Croatian: Mrdujska regata) is an annual regatta held in the city of Split, named after the islet of Mrduja in the Split Gates strait. It is contested over a course of 22 nautical miles (41 km; 25 mi).

The regatta's first edition took place in October 1927. It was not held during World War II, between 1941 and 1945. In the regatta's 75th edition in 2006, 312 sailboats took part in the race.
