= MV Mwanza =

History

Tanzania
- Name: MV Mwanza
- Owner: Tanzanian Government
- Operator: TEMESA
- Port of registry: Mwanza
- Route: Kigongo to Busisi (Mwanza)
- Builder: Marine Service Company Limited
- Cost: TSh 43million billion (US$3.9 million)
- Launched: 28 August 2017
- Completed: 21 June 2018
- In service: 11 July 2018
- Status: in service

General characteristics
- Type: Ro-Pax Ferry
- Tonnage: 250 GT
- Length: 57.88 meters
- Beam: 14.6 meters
- Draught: 1.6 meters
- Depth: 2.8 meters
- Decks: 5
- Ramps: 2
- Installed power: 2 x Cat 3406C diesel engine, each 298kW @ 1,800rpm
- Propulsion: 2 x Schottel SRP 150 FP rudder propellers
- Speed: 10.8 knots
- Capacity: 1000 passengers; 34 vehicles
- Crew: 8

MV Mwanza is a Lake Victoria ferry operating on Lake Victoria in Tanzania. The ferry is a Ro-Pax ferry that operates between the villages of Kigongo and Busisi south of Mwanza town across the Mwanza Gulf in east-west direction. MV Mwanza is not the only ferry along the route (there are three other ferries) which highlights the relevance of the ferry service.

The ferry has two decks for vehicles and goods (main deck and boat deck) and an indoor passenger deck with seats. It was constructed by a local Tanzanian construction company in Mwanza, Songoro Marine Transport. Until the MV New Mwanza, it was the largest Ro-Pax ferry on Lake Victoria.
