= Kuchugury =

Kuchugury Кучугуры
- Interactive map of Kuchugury
- Location of Kuchugury Kuchugury (Krasnodar Krai)
- Coordinates: 45°24.30′N 36°57.12′E
- Country: Russia
- Federal subject: Krasnodar Krai
- Administrative district: Temryuksky District
- Founded: 1924
- Current status since: 1923
- Elevation: 4 m (13 ft)

Population (2010 Census)
  - Total: 2,429
  - Estimate (2010): 2,429 (0%)
- Time zone: UTC+3 (MSK)
- Postal code: 353547
- OKTMO ID: 03651430111
- Website: kuchugury.ru

Kuchugury (Russian: Кучугу́ры) is a village in Temryuksky District, Krasnodar Krai, Russia, located on the Taman Peninsula on the western shore of the Temryuk Bay on the Sea of Azov. Kuchugury is located 38 km west of Temryuk, and 164 km west of Krasnodar.
