= Split Gates =

Strait in the Adriatic Sea

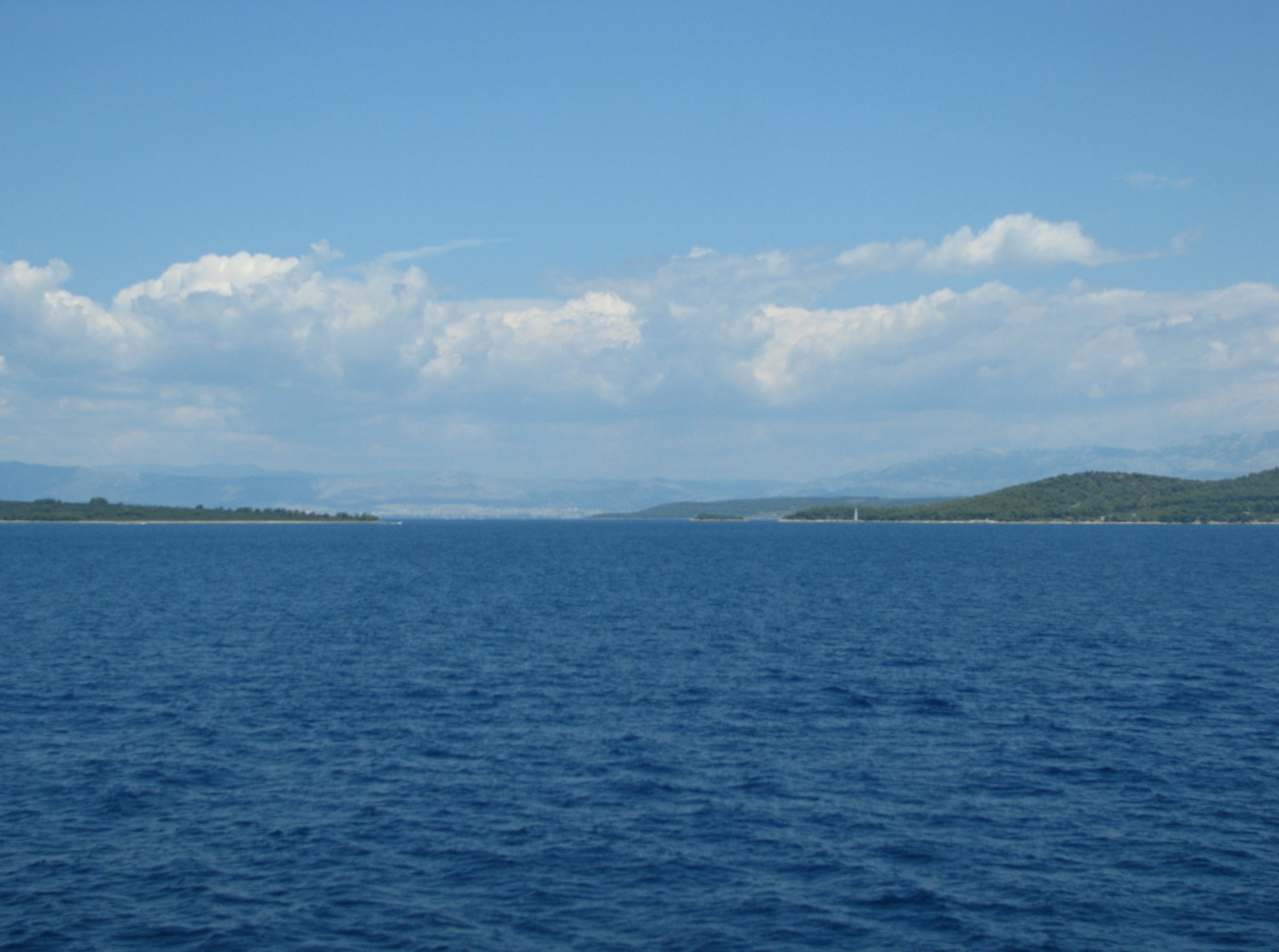
The Split Gates, viewed from the south. To the right is the island of Brač, to the left Šolta. Split itself is visible on the mainland in the background.

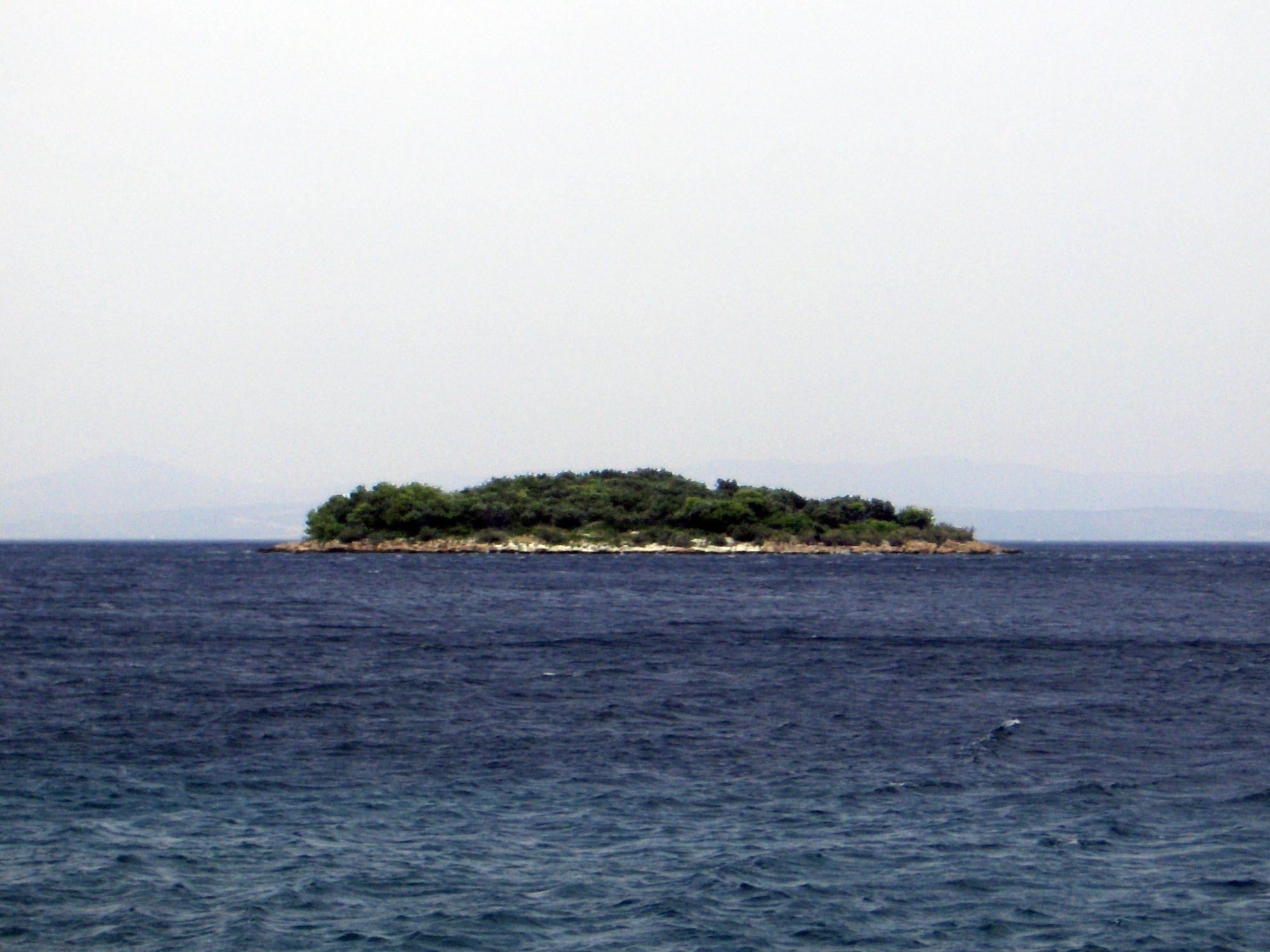
Mrduja island, from Cape Zaglav

The Split Gates (Croatian: Splitska vrata) are a strait in the Adriatic Sea between the Dalmatian islands of Šolta and Brač, named after the city of Split to which they lead. The strait is 1 nautical mile (1.9 km; 1.2 mi) long and approximately 800 metres (0.50 mi) wide. Immediately north beyond the strait lies the body of water known as the Split Channel (Splitski kanal). The islet of Mrduja is located within the strait.

== See also ==
- Split
- Split Channel
- Dalmatia
- Brač
- Šolta
