= MV New Mwanza =

RoPax Lake Victoria ferry

MV New Mwanza is a RoPax Lake Victoria ferry operating on Lake Victoria in Tanzania.

It was commissioned by the government of Tanzania on 23 January 2026, and constructed by South Korean and local companies at Mwanza South Port Shipyard.

With a gross displacement of 3500 tonnes, it is the largest freshwater ship in Africa. The intention is to integrate it with the Tanzania Standard Gauge Railway, so cargo can move directly from ship to rail.

On 18 November 2026, during technical trials with no ordinary passengers on board, it crashed into Bismarck Rocks near Mwanza.
