= Tanjina Sultana =

Fishing trawler

The Tanjina Sultana was a Bangladeshi flagged fishing trawler involved in migrant trafficking that sank in the Andaman Sea in April 2026. Of those traveling on the trawler at the time, nine were rescued and ~270 were reported missing.

== Sinking ==
The vessel left the port of Teknaf in southern Bangladesh bound for Malaysia, carrying 13 crew members and traffickers and around 280 passengers, of whom 150 were Rohingya and the rest Bengali. Due to adverse weather, members of the crew eventually forced passengers into compartments intended for storing fish, threatening to otherwise sink the ship. This forced move resulted in at least 25 to 30 deaths via suffocation. When nearing Andaman Island on April 9, the waves became too much for the overcrowded vessel to handle, and it capsized. Survivors spent two days in the water, clinging to plastic bottles and oil drums to keep them afloat until being rescued by the MT Meghna Pride. The MT Meghna Pride had been en route from Chattogram to Indonesia.

== Aftermath ==
Six crew members and three passengers were rescued; the crew members were arrested and jailed for human trafficking and the passengers were released. One survivor described being lured with promises of a job, then being held against his will in poor conditions in Teknaf until he was later forced onto the boat. Both the IOM and UNHCR released statements about the incident, urging for further support and bettered conditions of Rohingya in refugee camps, also issuing warnings against misleading job offers as part of human trafficking.
