= Mrduja =

Coordinates: 43°20.3′N 16°24.9′E

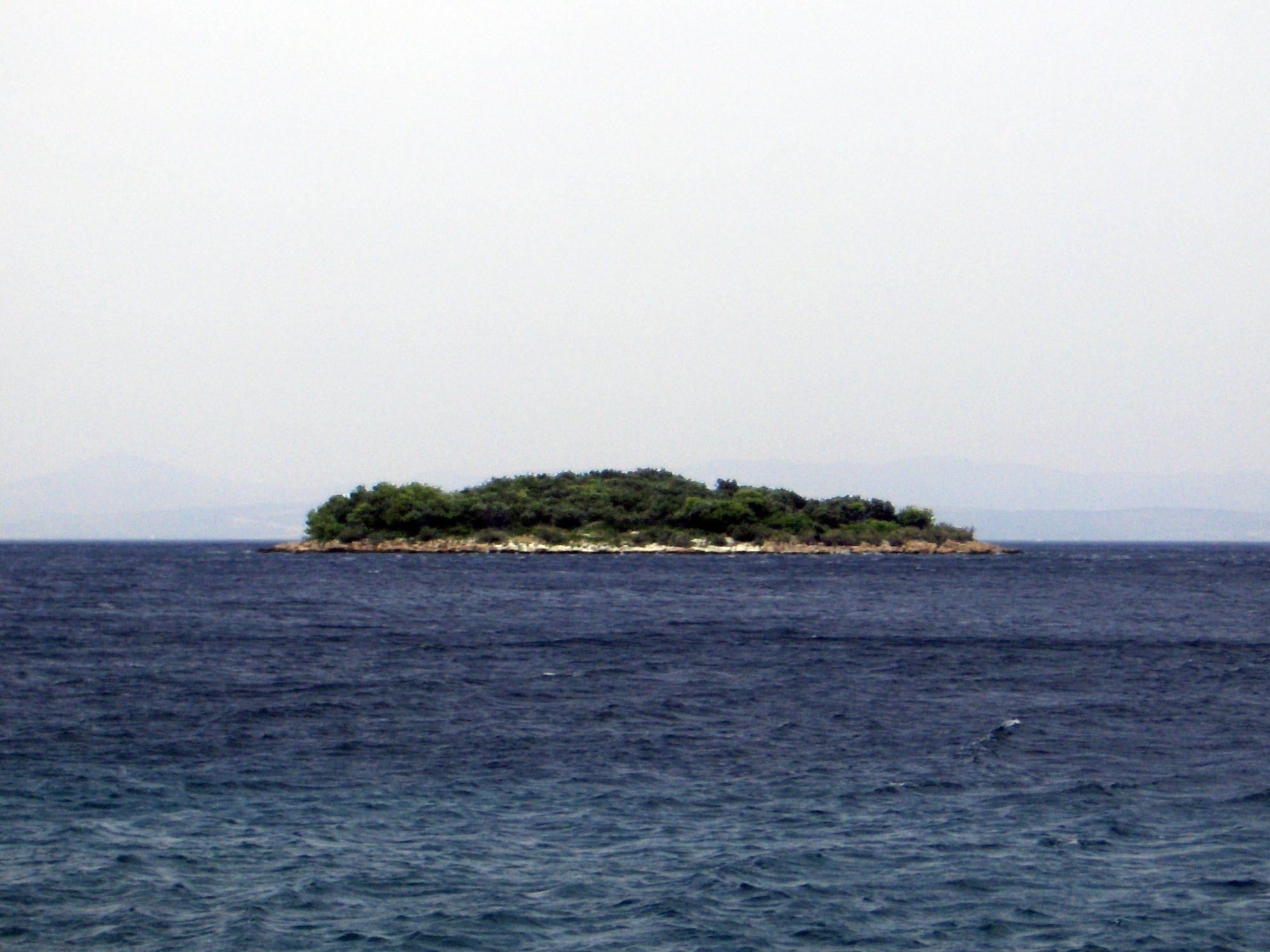
Mrduja from Cape Zaglav

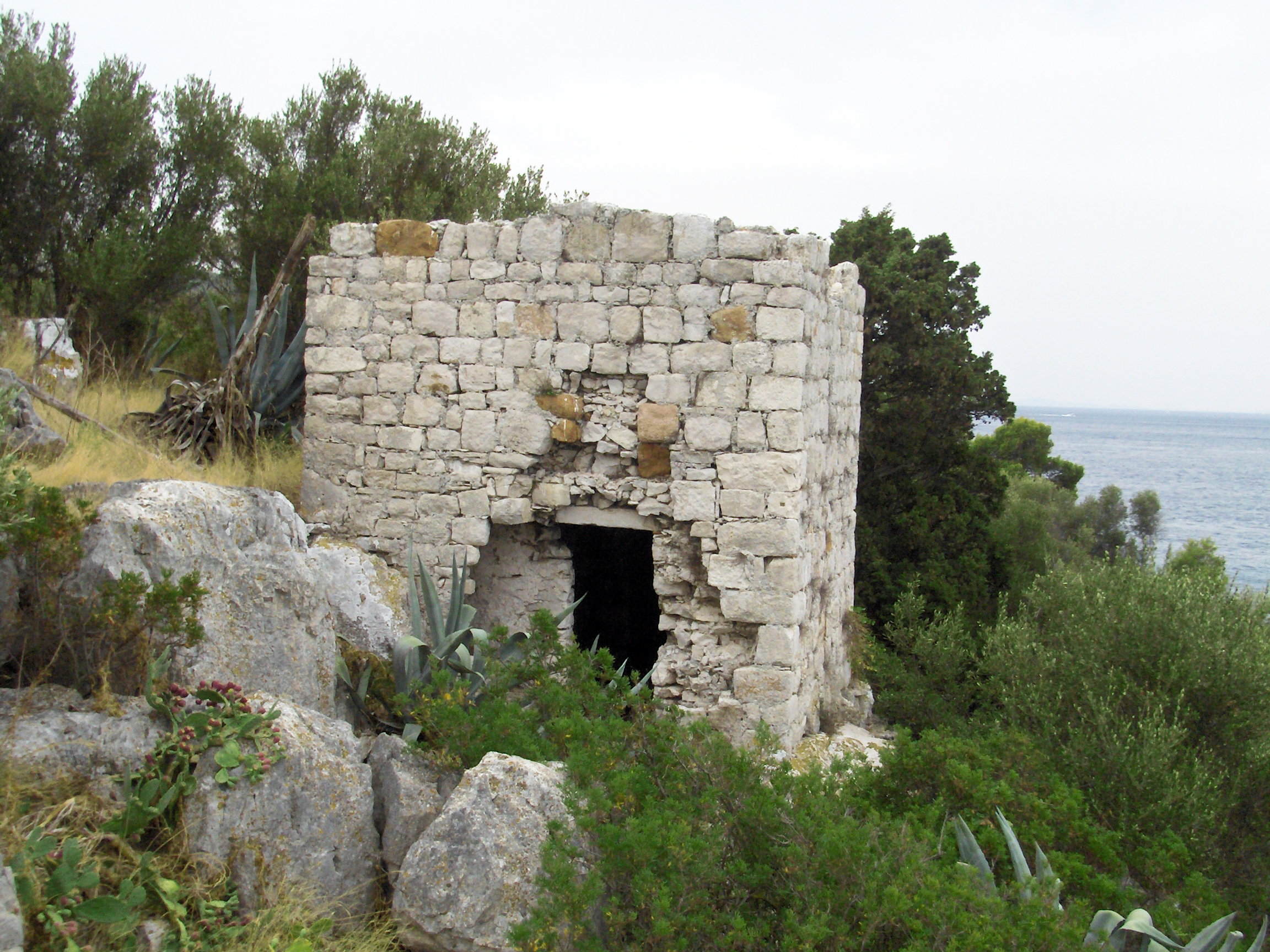
Remains of an old tower fortification on Mrduja

Mrduja is an uninhabited island in the Croatian region of Dalmatia. It is located in the Adriatic Sea, within the Split Gates between the islands of Brač and Šolta, about 400 m from Cape Zaglav near Milna. The island is nearer to Brač than to Šolta: a legend goes that the inhabitants of Brač and those of Šolta wrangled over whom the island belonged to so they used a rope in an attempt to pull it from one side of the Split Channel to the other. The people of Brač won the tug of war.

A lighthouse (CRO 099), the ruins of old fortification, and several pines, agaves and opuntias grace the islet, which is the turning point for the Mrduja Regatta.

== Geography ==
Location	Central Dalmatia
Surface area	0.013 km^{2}
Coast line	0.4 km
Highest point	11 m
Inhabitants	0

== See also ==
- Croatia
- Brač
- Dalmatia
