= Erhan Arıklı =

Turkish academic, politician and leader of the Rebirth Party

Erhan Arıklı (born 1962 in Ardahan) is a Turkish academic, politician, and leader of the Rebirth Party. He participated in the 2020 Turkish Republic of Northern Cyprus presidential election as the candidate of the Rebirth Party. He was appointed Minister of Public Works and Transport in the UBP+DP+YDP Coalition Government, which was established after the 23 January 2022 elections. On 2 September 2026, he was dismissed by Northern Cyprus prime minister Ünal Üstel as part of an investigation into the August 30 sinking of the Filo Jet ferry off the coast of Kyrenia.

In 1996, Cyprus Police issued an arrest warrant against Arıklı for his connection with the killing of unarmed protester Tassos Isaac, a Greek Cypriot refugee who participated in a civilian demonstration in August 1996 in the United Nations Buffer Zone in Cyprus. In 2021, Arıklı, then Minister of Economy and Energy of Northern Cyprus, revealed that he had been arrested and subsequently appeared in court after being pursued by Interpol. His statements came in response to reports from newspaper Kathimerini that the European Union had halted infrastructure funding in Northern Cyprus due to his actions. Arıklı explained that following an incident at Deryneia, he was accused by Greek authorities of inciting unrest, which led to his arrest in Kyrgyzstan.
