= Tashinga =

Tashinga is a village in the province of Mashonaland West, Zimbabwe. It is an extension of the Tashinga camp in the Matusadona National Park and can be accessed only by water. There is also a small airport called Tashinga Airport.

Tashinga is a part of the Intensive Protection Zone (IPZ) of Matusadona National Park, it is a base for the protection of Rhinos.
