= Sinking of the Filo Jet =

Maritime disaster in the Eastern Mediterranean

- Date: 30 August 2026
- Time: c. 12:20 (EEST)
- Location: 7.5 km (4.0 nautical miles) off the coast of Kyrenia, Cyprus
- Deaths: 27
- Missing: 1
- Arrests: 9

On 30 August 2026, the passenger ferry Filo Jet capsized and sank off the coast of de facto state Northern Cyprus while en route from Kyrenia to Taşucu, Turkey. The vessel was carrying 259 passengers and 8 crew members. Officials confirmed 27 dead, while one person remains missing.

== Background ==
Ferry travel in the Eastern Mediterranean is common for leisure, commerce, and general transportation, particularly during the summer and often carry residents of Northern Cyprus, many of whom hold either Turkish or Northern Cypriot passports, as well as Turks from mainland Turkey. Murat Şenkul, the mayor of Kyrenia, stated that the vessel belonged to the Filo Denizcilik company.

== Capsizing ==
The catamaran-style ferry Filo Jet was traveling from the port of Kyrenia in Cyprus to Taşucu in Turkey's Mersin province. It was scheduled to sail on 29 August, but the trip was postponed until the next day due to severe weather. The ship carried 259 passengers and 8 crew, and departed at 11:58 local time (UTC+3). It began taking on water 7.5 km (4.0 nautical miles) off the coast after encountering rough seas.

The captain issued a distress call, prompting a response from the coastguard. Reports indicate that the vessel hit a large wave, and while attempting to recover, was struck by a second wave that caused it to roll over and capsize. The ship sank off Kyrenia at a depth of 554 meters (1,818 ft). Photographs show passengers standing on the hull of the capsized vessel before it sank.

== Search and rescue ==
Turkish and Turkish Cypriot forces initiated a joint search and rescue operation. Four coastguard vessels from Northern Cyprus, along with aircraft and helicopters from Turkey, took part. Turkish Authorities confirmed that 241 survivors were brought ashore. On 7 September, Northern Cyprus prime minister Ünal Üstel, confirmed 14 dead and 14 missing. By 28 September, 3 bodies had been found, and on 6 October the death toll rose to 23, and 5 missing. On 9 October the official death toll was 27, with one person missing.

== Investigation ==
Üstel announced that an inquiry would be launched, while Turkish Cypriot minister of transport Erhan Arıklı noted that given the depth of the shipwreck, specialized vessels and divers would be required from Turkey to recover the data recorder.

Filo Jet was built in 2000, and had suffered damage from earlier incidents stretching back over 20 years, including a breached hull after striking a quay in 2003, and a 2014 accident in Turkey. Inspections in June 2018 revealed 29 defects, including engine smoke, a coolant leak, and deficient engines, leading to a December 2018 finding that she was unfit for service.

Police told the Kyrenia District Court that the ferry's left hull fractured four miles from port and began taking on water before sinking. The crew ignored earlier warnings from passengers about water ingress and continued the journey. An expert report prepared for the police noted that crew did not provide passengers with emergency evacuation instructions, distress calls were late, and that Captain Mustafa Öz left the ship without managing the emergency.

Öz's Turkish certification had lapsed and he received Greek and Northern Cyprus recognition for a replacement that he obtained in Honduras.

The ship's black box was retrieved from the wreck on 9 October, and investigators found that it had been shut off two days before the accident. An older recording captured a voice saying "This ship won't last this season."

== Aftermath ==
The captain and seven crew, along with Filo Denizcilik's managing director, were arrested by Northern Cyprus police as part of an investigation into "causing death through negligence", with arrest warrants issued for another seven. Their detention was later extended until mid-September. The Ministry of Transport ordered Filo Denizcilik to halt all service from Northern Cyprus. On 9 October their detention was extended a further seven days.

Arıklı was dismissed by Üstel on 2 September, and on September 5, three more senior officials of the Ministry of Public Works and Transport were fired.

Political leaders in the region extended their condolences, including Turkish president Recep Tayyip Erdoğan and Konstantinos Letymbiotis, the government spokesperson of the Republic of Cyprus, who expressed the Republic's readiness to assist in search and rescue efforts. United Nations special representative in Cyprus Khassim Diagne offered condolences.

Filo Denizcilik issued a statement expressing that they were "deeply saddened by the tragic accident". The Northern Cyprus Council of Ministers declared three days of national mourning.
