= Ramcha =

Ramcha رمچا
- Village
- Location within Iran
- Coordinates: 26°54′35″N 56°08′10″E
- Country: Iran
- Province: Hormozgan
- County: Qeshm
- Bakhsh: Central
- Rural District: Howmeh

Population (2006)
  - Total: 3,004
- Time zone: UTC+3:30 (IRST)
  - Summer (DST): UTC+4:30 (IRDT)

Ramcha (Persian: رمچا, also Romanized as Ramchā; also known as Ramchāh and Rameh Chāh) is a village in Howmeh Rural District, in the Central District of Qeshm County, Hormozgan Province, Iran. At the 2006 census, its population was 3,004, in 568 families.
