= D114 road =

Road in Croatia

D114 state road

Route information
- Length: 18.8 km (11.7 mi)

Major junctions
- From: D113 in Supetar
- To: Milna

Location
- Country: Croatia
- Counties: Split-Dalmatia
- Major cities: Supetar, Milna

Highway system
- Highways in Croatia

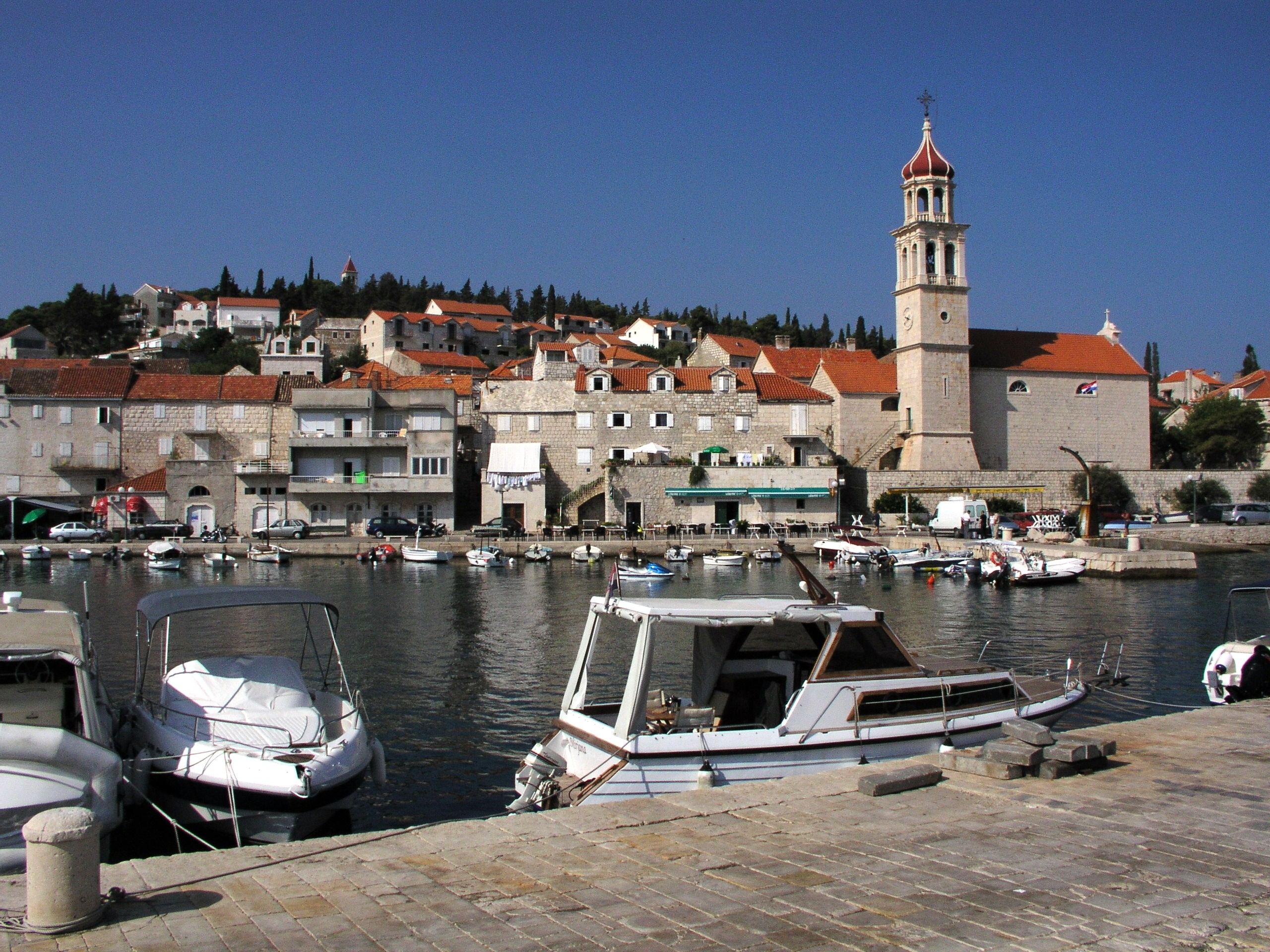
Sutivan, on the D114 road route

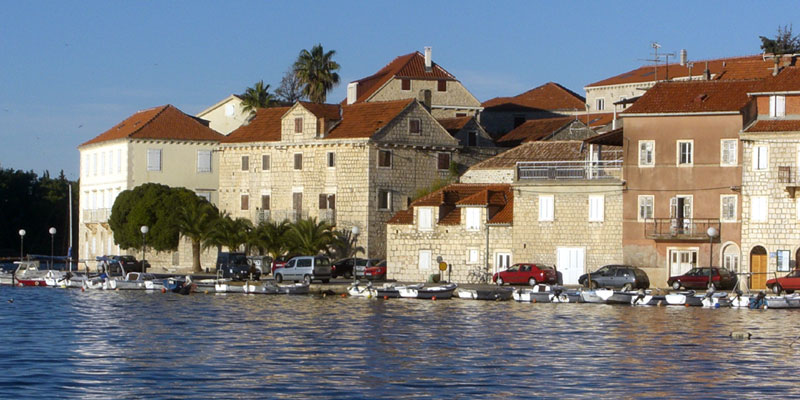
Milna, at the western terminus the D114 road

D114 is a state road on island of Brač in Croatia connecting towns of Milna and Supetar from where Jadrolinija ferries fly to the mainland, docking in Split and the D410 state road (via D113 state road). The road is 18.8 km (11.7 mi) long.

The road, as well as all other state roads in Croatia, is managed and maintained by Hrvatske ceste, a state-owned company.

== Road junctions and populated areas ==
D114 junctions/populated areas
| Type | Slip roads/Notes |
| | Supetar; D113 to Supetar ferry port and to Nerežišće and Sumartin. The eastern terminus of the road. |
| | L67113 to Gornja Mirca and Donja Mirca. |
| | Sutivan |
| | Ložišća; Ž6188 to Nerežišće (D113). |
| | Bobovišća |
| | Milna; The western terminus of the road. |
