= Donji Humac =

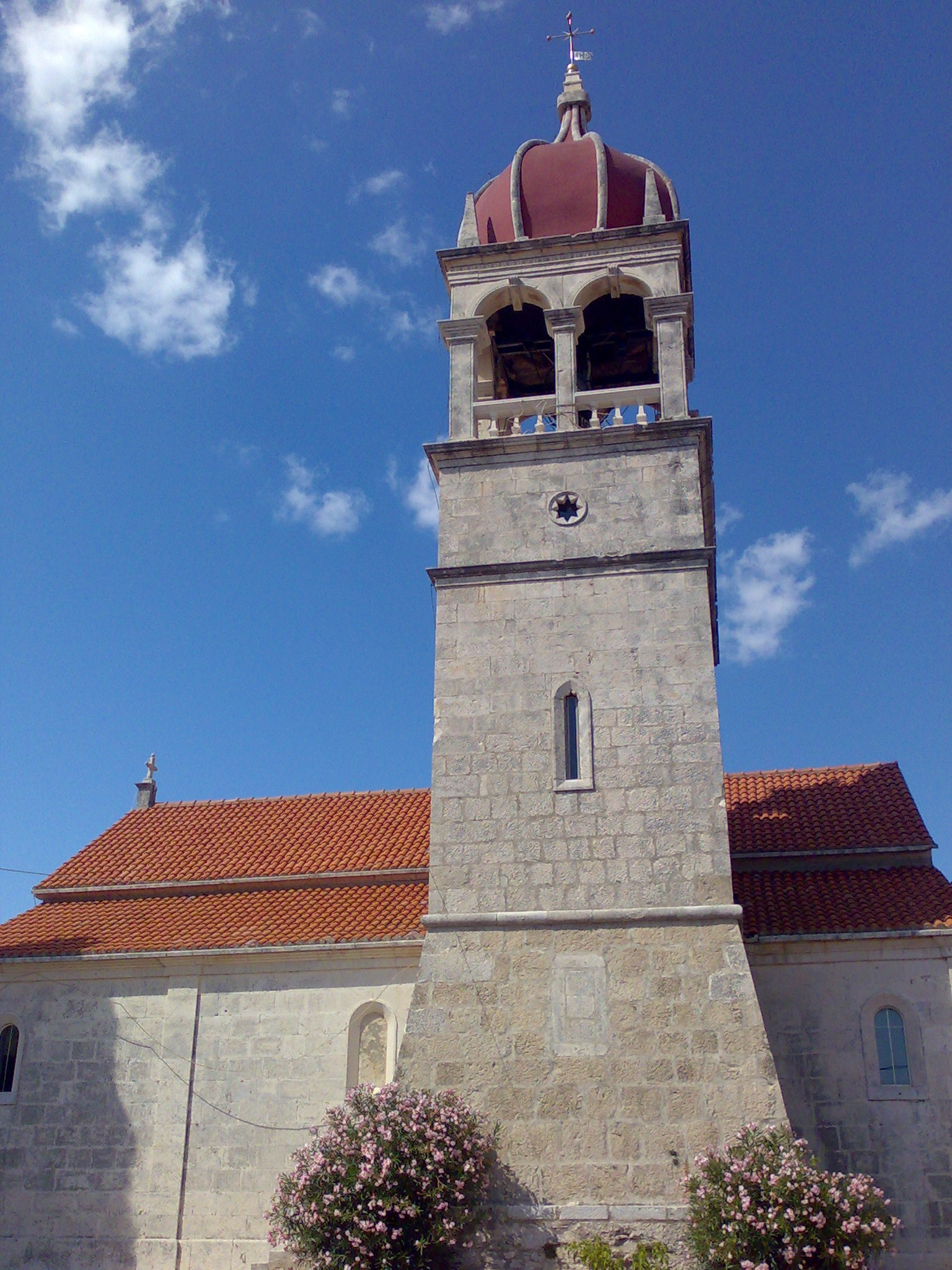
- Church of Saint Fabian and Sebastian
- Interactive map of Donji Humac
- Location of Donji Humac in Croatia
- Coordinates: 43°20′25″N 16°33′35″E
- Country: Croatia
- Region: Dalmatia
- County: Split-Dalmatia
- Island: Brač
- Municipality: Nerežišća

Area
  - Total: 7.6 km^{2} (2.9 sq mi)
- Elevation: 313 m (1,027 ft)

Population (2021)
  - Total: 173
  - Density: 23/km^{2} (59/sq mi)
- Time zone: UTC+1 (CET)
  - Summer (DST): UTC+2 (CEST)
- Postal code: 21 423
- Area code: 021
- Licence plate: ST

Donji Humac is one of the oldest settlements on the Croatian island of Brač, located on an inland hill. The top of the hill is marked by a widely visible Baroque bell-tower. The nearby Kopačina cave was inhabited more than 13,200 years ago. As of the 2011 census, Donji Humac has a population of 177 – far below its height at the beginning of the 20th century of more than 500 people, before several waves of emigration depopulated the settlement.

The village is about 1 kilometre (0.62 mi) north-west of Nerežišća, and linked to Supetar, the largest city of Brač, through a paved 6 kilometres (3.7 mi) road northwards, mostly following state road D113. A county road (Ž6188) leads westwards to Dračevica, about 2.4 kilometres (1.5 mi) away.

To the south and west of the settlement are fertile fields, where traces of pre-Croatian habitation have been found. Some of these traces, such as Roman ornaments, have been incorporated into the houses of the settlement, such as those of the Dragičević and Laurić families.

Donji Humac is surrounded by a number of quarries. The local stone gave the settlement its distinct look very early on, and many old elements of the settlement are still preserved. The closeness to the quarries also led to a tradition of artistic stonemasonry in the village, which continues today. In 1996, an international meeting of stonemasons led to the creation of a number of monuments which are now spread throughout the settlement. Besides stone, the main sources of income have traditionally been wine, olives, cherries, sheep husbandry, hunting and, more recently, tourism.

== History ==
It is assumed that in the 11th century, Donji Humac was called Gomilje or Gomirje and had already been a settlement for a while. In 1080, a Brač person named Tišen bought from a Split aristocrat named Cassarias some houses and land in Gomilje. Gomilje lies on the western side of the Humac hill, just below Kis (from the Latin word ecclesia). A cloister and the oldest buildings of Donji Humac are expected to have been in Kis, close to the Smokvica pond.

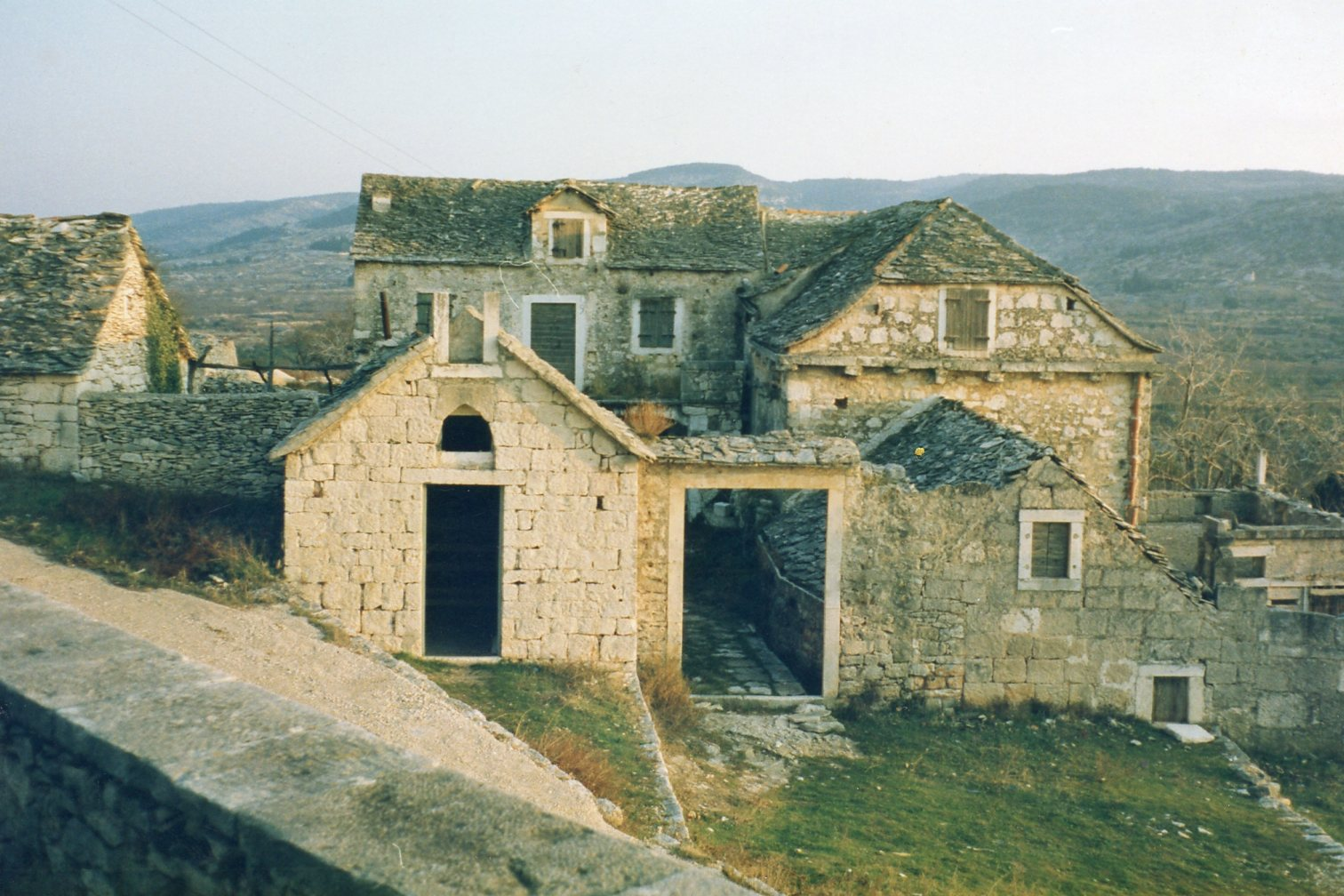
Old stone houses of Donji Humac

The name Humac is mentioned in sources for the first time in 1305. The settlers are supposed to have come from the area of Saint Elias and Banje to the west of Humac. The name Donji Humac (literally translated as "lower hillside") was only introduced later to differentiate it from Gornji Humac ("upper hillside"), which is on the eastern high plateau of Brač. Traditionally in Slavic culture, the east was associated with up and the west with down.

In medieval times, most of the population of Brač lived inland, as the coast was too dangerous due to pirate and other attacks. During that time, the northwest of the island belonged to Donji Humac, including the settlements Sutivan and Mirca, both of which are larger than Donji Humac today. In the 20th century, the worsening economic situation in Donji Humac – first through the grape phylloxera louse, which destroyed several grape harvests and thus the wine production; later World War II and its aftermath – led to several waves of emigration. This has left Donji Humac today with only a third or quarter of the population of a century ago.

== Kopačina cave ==
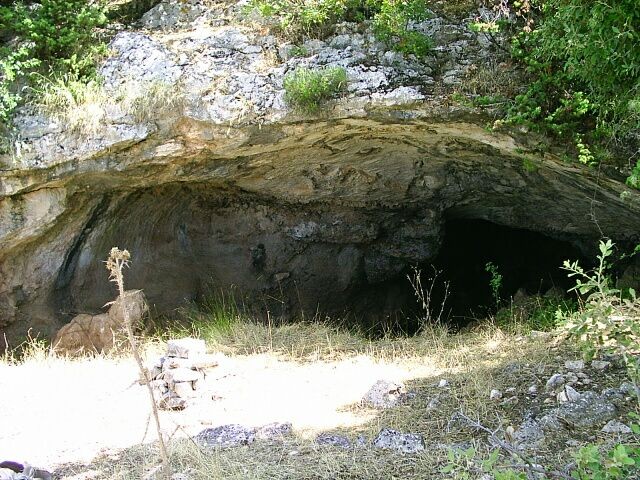
Entrance to the Kopačina cave

Cultural objects dug out from the cave of Kopačina, 1 kilometre (0.62 mi) to the north-west of Donji Humac, indicate human habitation since the Stone Age. The cave is about 12 metres (13 yd) long and has two chambers.

Remains of wild horses, birds, deer, and bears were found, as well as stone knives, drills, arrow tips, and other Mesolithic tools, and numerous Mesolithic flint weapons, have been found in the front chamber. In the middle part of the cave, ceramics and an early Bronze Age axe have been found. In the back of the cave, human remains from the Epipaleolithic and the Mesolithic have been found. The radiolarite rock used for some of the objects found in the cave is not known to exist on the Dalmatian islands or coast, and indicates connections to the Dalmatian hinterland, likely the mouth of the Neretva or the Budva region.

The cave was first explored by Frane Bulić in 1890. It was previously thought that the cave was continuously inhabited from the late Upper Paleolithic through the Mesolithic until the Bronze Age, i.e. from the 8th to the 3rd millennium BC. More recent research indicates an even older original usage – before 13,200 BP (although it is unknown how long before) – but not continuously to the Bronze Age. That would make the findings in the cave possibly the oldest traces of human settlement not only on Brač but in all of Dalmatia.

== Churches ==
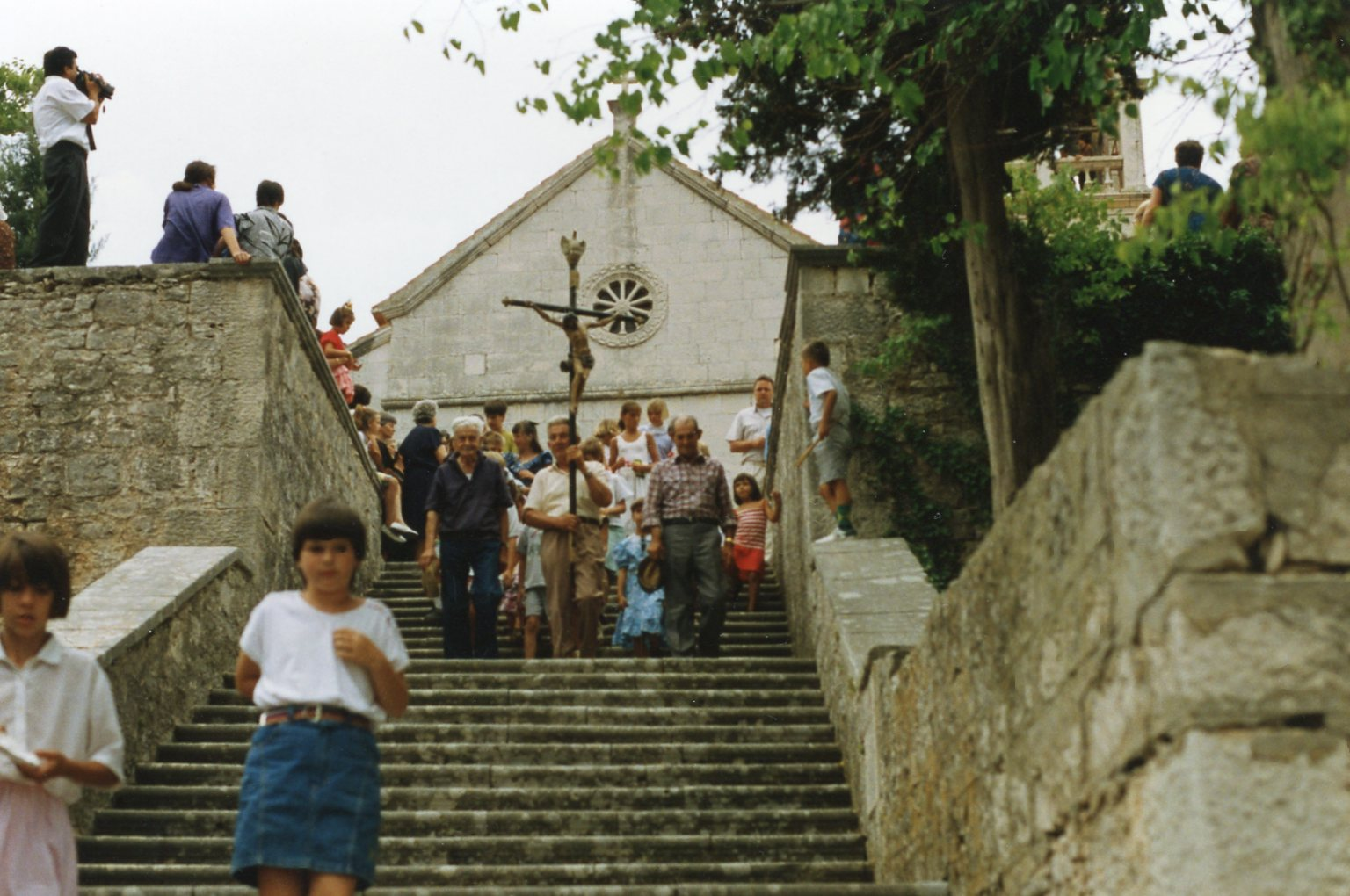
Procession to honor St Ana

The parish church of Saint Fabian and Sebastian is on the top of Donji Humac and dominates the view on the hill with its widely visible Baroque bell tower. Originally, there was a church here that old documents called Stomorica (Santa Maria). Linguistically, the name indicates that the church was built in the 10th century. The altar has an inscription dated to 1175. In the 14th century, the church was expanded to double its previous size with Romanesque arches. From 1725 to 1742, the church was again expanded. The Baroque bell tower and the two side ships of the church were added at that time, built by Ignac Macanović from Trogir. The church organ was built in 1775 by Franco Dazzi.

The church hosts a fresco of Christ sitting on his throne between his mother and St John the Baptist, dating from the 13th century. According to legend, every year on January 20, the day of St Fabian and Sebastian, dew would fall on the fresco, which led to many pilgrims coming to Donji Humac. In the church, more than 250 votive offerings gathered over the centuries are on display. Later, the main pilgrimage to Donji Humac moved to July 26, the day of Saint Ana. Today the annual feast of Saint Ana includes a large celebration and the blessing of motor vehicles.

The old cemetery of Donji Humac is around the parish church. A new cemetery was opened in the 17th century on the western slope of the hill, with a small church dedicated to Our Lady of Carmel.

The pre-Romanesque church of Saint Elias is located about 800 metres (870 yd) to the west of Donji Humac, and dates to the 10th century. On its side are the remains of a Roman mausoleum. Some of the ornaments of the mausoleum were used when building Saint Elias. The mausoleum has been called the most beautiful ancient monument on the island. Saint Elias has an apse that is rectangular from the outside and a semi-circle from the inside. To the west of the church is the hill Trišćenik (Croatian trisk = thunder); this may be intended as a juxtaposition of the pagan thunder god with Saint Elias, who is known as the saint of thunder.

To the north of Donji Humac is the ruin of the church of Saint Luke, an early Romanesque church from the 11th or 12th century. The inside of the church hosts the earliest known sketch of a boat in Croatian medieval art. Surrounding Saint Lucas are a number of stone sarcophagi that document the tradition of creating these since Roman times.

Saint Andrew, north east of the town, was built in the 13th or 14th century, on top of Roman ancient ruins. Its roof has since collapsed. Around Saint Andrew, a number of old Croatian earrings and 11th century Byzantine coins have been found. A number of old chronicles of Brač mention a Benedictine cloister in the area, but the cloister has not been found.

== Demographic development ==
As with most settlements on Brač, Donji Humac saw continuous growth since its settlement, gaining speed in the 19th century and reaching a height in the early 20th century – when particularly due to the grape phylloxera louse, the local production of wine broke down. This destroyed many of the available local economic opportunities, and to a large wave of emigration. People from Donji Humac have moved to Antofagasta in Chile, Perth in Australia, Auckland in New Zealand, the United States and later also Germany.

Population census of the town
Year	1579	1645	1681	1705	1724	1738	1764	1857	1869	1880	1890	1900	1910	1931	1948	1961	1971	1981	1991	2001	2011	2021
Pop.	90	140	130	140	196	235	238	233	333	384	455	506	540	452	442	372	256	196	210	166	157	177
±%	—	+55.6%	−7.1%	+7.7%	+40.0%	+19.9%	+1.3%	−2.1%	+42.9%	+15.3%	+18.5%	+11.2%	+6.7%	−16.3%	−2.2%	−15.8%	−31.2%	−23.4%	+7.1%	−21.0%	−5.4%	+12.7%
Source: 1857-2021 Državni zavod za statistiku

Donji Humac: Population development
v

population	90	140	140	235	238	233	333	384	455	506	540	452	442	372	256	196	210	166	157	177
	1579	1645	1705	1738	1764	1857	1869	1880	1890	1900	1910	1931	1948	1961	1971	1981	1991	2001	2011	2021

Sources: 1579-1764 Vrsalović, Dasen (1968). Povijest otoka Brača [History of the island Brač] (in Croatian). Supetar: Skupština općine Brač., 1857-2021 Croatian census

== Literature ==
- Barilla, Robert (2022). "Donji Humac". Otok Brač — Negdje između mora i zvijezda [Island Brač — Somewhere between the sea and the stars] (in Croatian). Supetar: Zaklada Otok Brač. pp. 426–483. ISBN 978-953-8395-00-0.
- Šimunović, Petar (1997). "Donji Humac". Brač — Führer über die Insel [Brač - Guide to the island] (in German). Zagreb: Golden Marketing. pp. 54–59. ISBN 953-6168-32-4.
- Vlahović, Darko (2007). "Donji Humac". Otok Brač - Jadranska arkadija [Island Brač - Adriatic arcadia] (in Croatian). Split: Netgen. p. 62. ISBN 978-953-7525-00-2.
