= D113 road =

Road in Croatia

D113 state road

Route information
- Length: 39.4 km (24.5 mi)

Major junctions
- From: Supetar ferry port
- D114 in Supetar; D115 in Gornji Humac
- To: Sumartin ferry port

Location
- Country: Croatia
- Counties: Split-Dalmatia
- Major cities: Supetar, Sumartin

Highway system
- Highways in Croatia

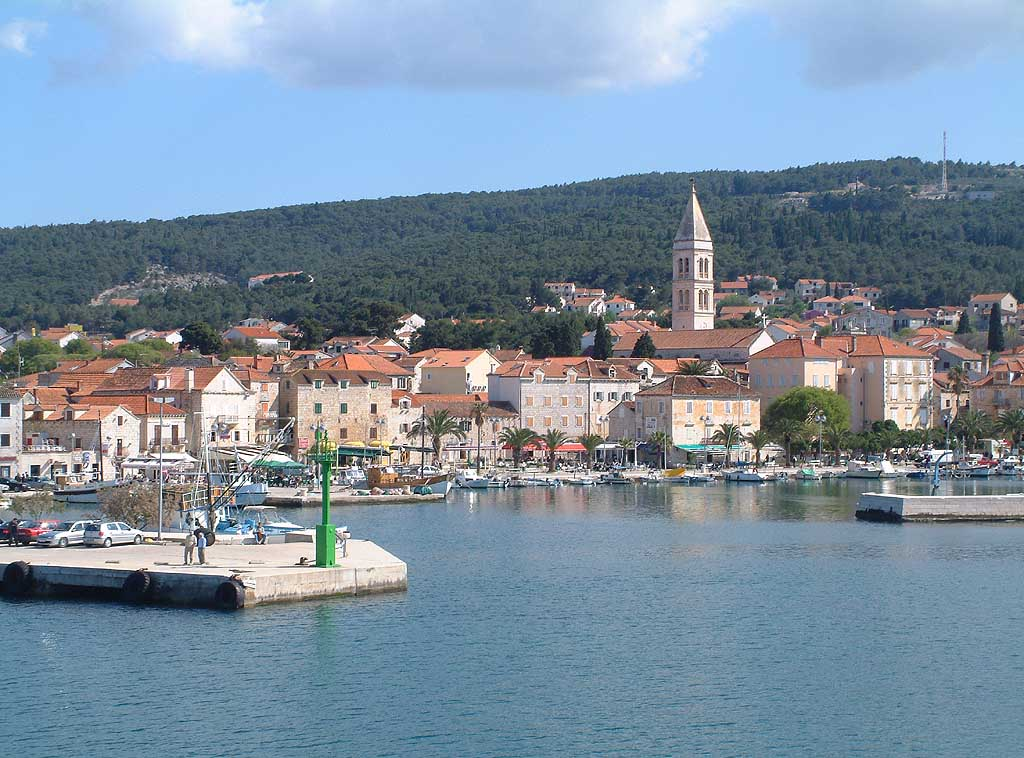
Supetar, at the western terminus of the D113 road

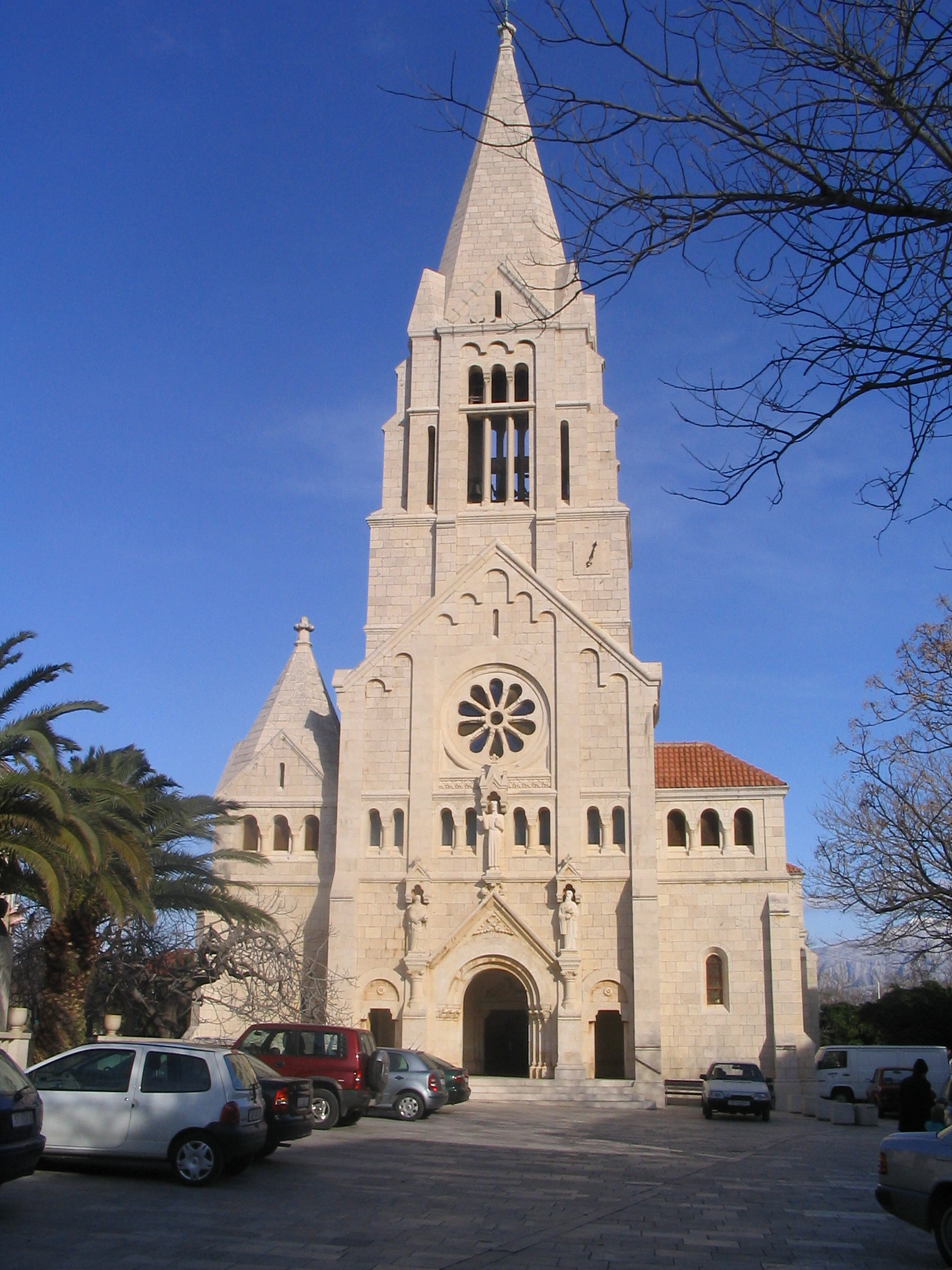
Selca, on the D113 road route

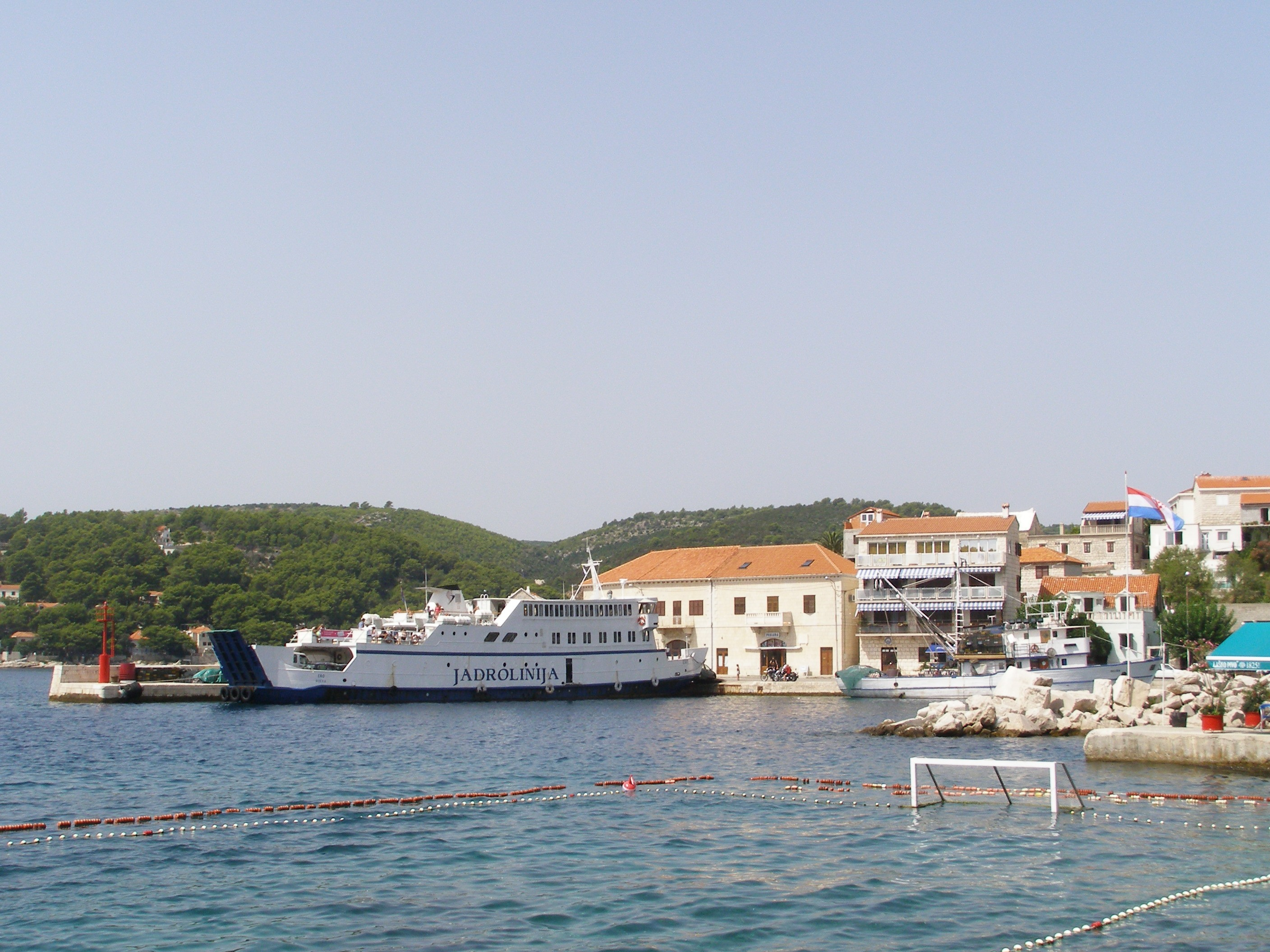
Sumartin ferry port, at the eastern terminus the D113 road

D113 is the main state road on the island of Brač in Croatia connecting the towns of Supetar and Sumartin and ferry ports in those two towns, from where Jadrolinija ferries fly to the mainland, docking in Split and the D410 state road (from Supetar) and Makarska and the D411 state road (from Sumartin). The road is 39.4 km (24.5 mi) long.

The road, as well as all other state roads in Croatia, is managed and maintained by Hrvatske ceste, a state-owned company.

== Traffic volume ==
Traffic is regularly counted and reported by Hrvatske ceste (HC), operator of the road. Furthermore, the HC report number of vehicles using Split – Supetar and Makarska – Sumartin ferry lines, connecting the D113 road to the D410 and the D411 state roads. Substantial variations between annual (AADT) and summer (ASDT) traffic volumes are attributed to the fact that the road connects a number of island resorts to the mainland.

D113 traffic volume
Road	Counting site	AADT	ASDT	Notes
D113	631 Split – Supetar	914	1,989	Vehicles using Split-Supetar ferry line.
D113	5907 Supetar south	2,190	3,491	Adjacent to the D114 junction.
D113	638 Makarska-Sumartin	74	220	Vehicles using Makarska-Sumartin ferry line.

== Road junctions and populated areas ==
D113 junctions/populated areas
Type	Slip roads/Notes
	Supetar ferry port – access to the mainland port of Split (by Jadrolinija) and D410 to Split and A1 motorway Dugopolje interchange. The western terminus of the road.
	Supetar; D114 to Sutivan and Milna. Ž6161 to Postira and Pučišća.
	Nerežišće; Ž6188 to Ložišća. Ž6189 to Škrip.
	Ž6190 to Vidova gora
	Pražnica; Ž6193 to Pučišća.
	Gornji Humac; D115 to Brač Airport and Bol.
	Selca; Ž6194 to Povlja.
	Sumartin
	Sumartin ferry port – access to the mainland port of Makarska (by Jadrolinija) and D411 to Tučepi and Baška Voda (via D8 state road); The eastern terminus of the road.
