= D115 road =

Road in Croatia

D115 state road

Route information
- Length: 11.4 km (7.1 mi)

Major junctions
- From: D113 in Gornji Humac
- To: Bol

Location
- Country: Croatia
- Counties: Split-Dalmatia
- Major cities: Bol

Highway system
- Highways in Croatia

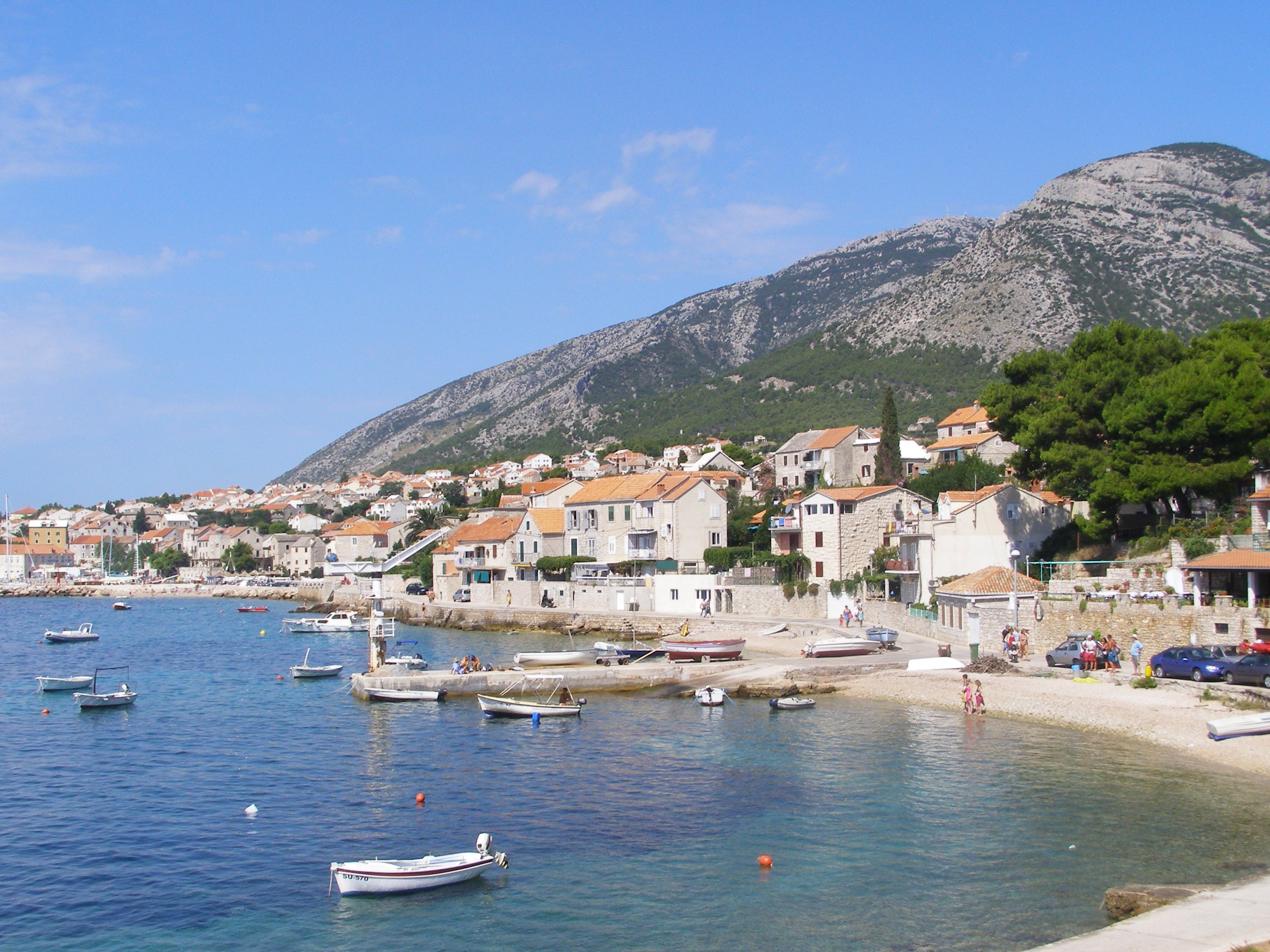
Bol, at the southern terminus the D115 road

D115 is a state road on island of Brač in Croatia connecting the town of Bol and the D113 state road, which in turn connects the D115 road to Supetar from where Jadrolinija ferries float to the mainland, docking in Split and the D410 state road. The road is 11.4 km (7.1 mi) long.

The road, as well as all other state roads in Croatia, is managed and maintained by Hrvatske ceste, a state-owned company.

== Road junctions and populated areas ==
D114 junctions/populated areas
Type	Slip roads/Notes
	Gornji Humac; D113 to Supetar ferry port and Nerežišće (to the west) and to Sumartin (to the east). The northern terminus of the road.
	Ž6192 to Brač Airport.
	Bol; Ž6191 to Zlatni Rat. The southern terminus of the road.
