= Bobovišća =

- Village
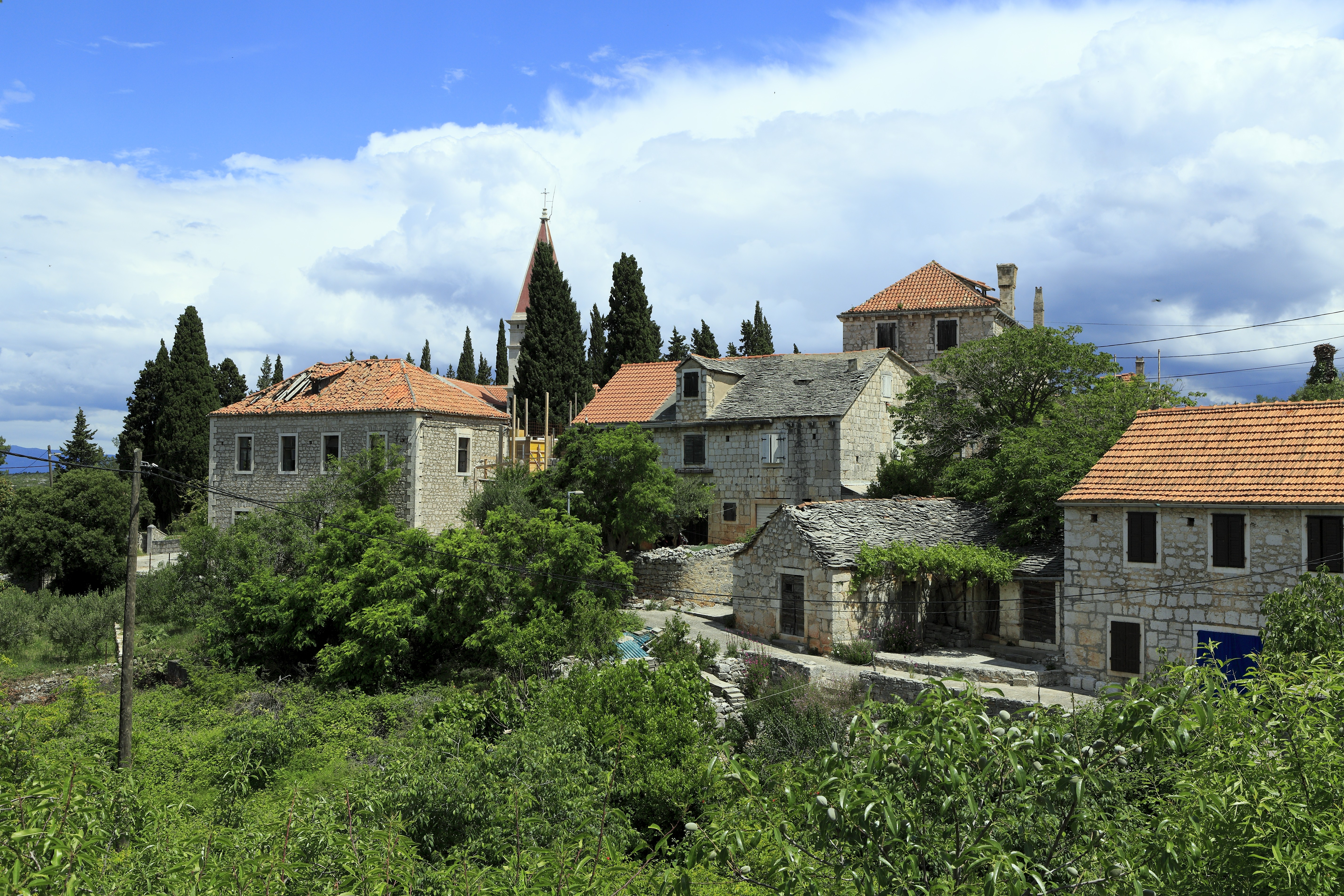
- Interactive map of Bobovišća
- Location within Croatia
- Coordinates: 43°21′N 16°28′E
- Country: Croatia
- County: Split-Dalmatia
- Municipality: Milna

Area
  - Total: 1.7 km^{2} (0.66 sq mi)

Population (2021)
  - Total: 15
  - Density: 8.8/km^{2} (23/sq mi)
- Time zone: UTC+1 (CET)
  - Summer (DST): UTC+2 (CEST)
- Postal code: 21405 Milna
- Area code: +385 (0)21

Bobovišća is a village near Milna on the west coast of the island of Brač in Croatia. It is located on a cove that branches into two ports, Bobovišća na Moru and Vičja luka. It is connected by the Road D114.

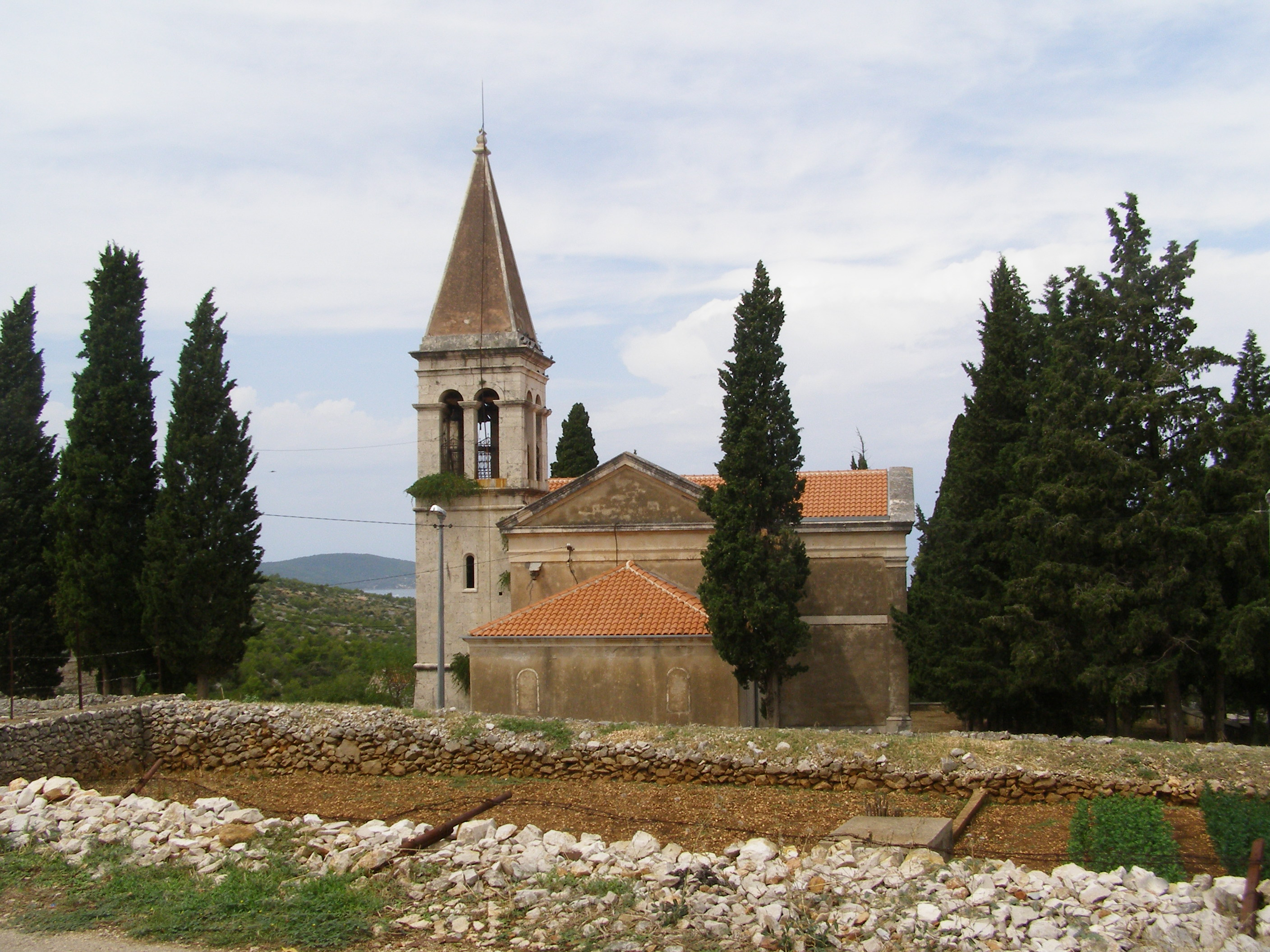
Saint George church in Bobovišća
