= Petar Šimunović =

Croatian linguist and onomastician (1933–2014)

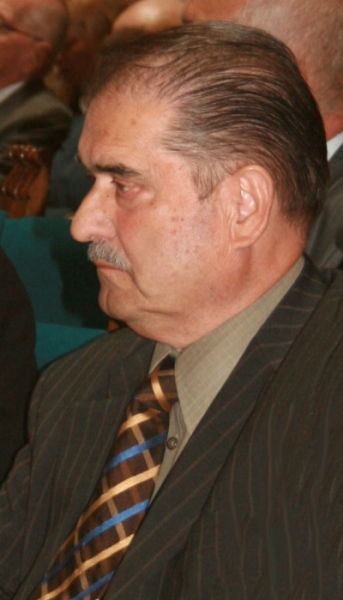
- Petar Šimunović in 2008, HAZU
- Born: February 19, 1933; Dračevica, Croatia
- Died: August 5, 2014 (aged 81); Split, Croatia
- Occupation: Linguist

Academic background
- Thesis: Toponimija otoka Brača (1970)

Academic work
- Notable works: Toponimija otoka Brača (1972); Leksik prezimena Socijalističke Republike Hrvatske (1976); Čakavisch-deutsches Lexikon I-III (1979–1983); Naša prezimena (1985); Istočnojadranska toponimija (1986); Hrvatski prezimenik I-III (2008)

Petar Šimunović (19 February 1933 – 5 August 2014) was a Croatian linguist, onomastician, dialectologist, lexicographer, and academic member of HAZU. He was considered as the most prominent Croatian onomastician (since the second half of the 20th century), and contributed also in the field of dialectology (particularly about Chakavian dialect).

== Biography ==
He was born on 19 February 1933 in the village Dračevica on the island of Brač. He received a degree in Yugoslav languages and Romance studies at the Faculty of Philosophy in Zagreb in 1958 with thesis Sumartinska onomastika, and doctoral thesis Toponimija otoka Brača in 1970.

Since 1964 he started to work at the Institute of Croatian Language and Linguistics of JAZU (later HAZU), in the department of onomastics. He was elected scientific advisor in 1979 and retired in 2003. As the recipient of the Humboldt Foundation scholarship he worked at the Slavic Department of the University of Cologne between 1972 and 1974 under Reinhold Olesch mentorship, and lectured between 1994 and 1998. In his honor, the University of Cologne organized in 1998 international scientific conference on Slavic onomastics, and was a member of various international Slavic organizations. He was a regular member of HAZU since 1991, and member of Presidency between 2011 and 2014. He lectured onomastics at the postgraduate study of Croatian studies at the Faculty of Philosophy in Zagreb and at the postgraduate study of linguistics at the Faculty of Philosophy in Zadar. Besides doing research in the field of onomastics, also did field research in dialectology, particularly Chakavian, for the Slavic Linguistic Atlas (OLA) and Croatian Dialect Atlas (HDA).

During his scientific career he received several awards, including award of the Municipality of Brač (1983), State award "Božidar Adžija" (1984), Order of Danica Hrvatska "Ruđer Bošković" (1998), State Lifetime Achievement award (2000), State award in the field of humanistic sciences (2009).

Šimunović died on 5 August 2014 in Split. In 2020, was published monography U početku bijaše ime, including works from international scientific conference "Tragovima onomastičkih istraživanja Petra Šimunovića" held in July 2019.

== Selected works ==
Šimunović as an author and co-author published over 500 scientific, scientific popular and professional articles, and 30 books. He was also main editor of academic journal Folia onomastica Croatica and member of editorial board of journal Rasprave. Collaborated in the writing of Grundsystem und Terminologie der slavischen Onomastik (1983), Słowiańska onomastyka – encyklopedia (2002).

- Toponimija otoka Brača (1972)
- Brač - vodič po otoku (1972–1997)
- Leksik prezimena Socijalističke Republike Hrvatske (1976)
- Čakavisch-deutsches Lexikon I-III (1979–1983)
- Naša prezimena – porijeklo, značenje, rasprostranjenost (1985)
- Prezimena i naselja u Istri I-III (1985–1986)
- Istočnojadranska toponimija (1986)
- Hrvatska prezimena – porijeklo, značenje, rasprostranjenost (1995)
- Bračka toponimija (2004)
- Toponimija hrvatskoga jadranskog prostora (2005)
- Rječnik bračkih čakavskih govora (2006)
- Hrvatski prezimenik I-III (2008)
- Hrvatska u prezimenima (2008)
- Uvod u hrvatsko imenoslovlje (2009)
- Rječnik bračkih čakavskih govora (2009)
- Čakavska čitanka (2011)
