= D411 road =

Road in Croatia

D411 state road

Route information
- Length: 1.5 km (0.93 mi)

Major junctions
- From: D8 in Makarska
- To: Makarska ferry port

Location
- Country: Croatia
- Counties: Split-Dalmatia
- Major cities: Makarska

Highway system
- Highways in Croatia

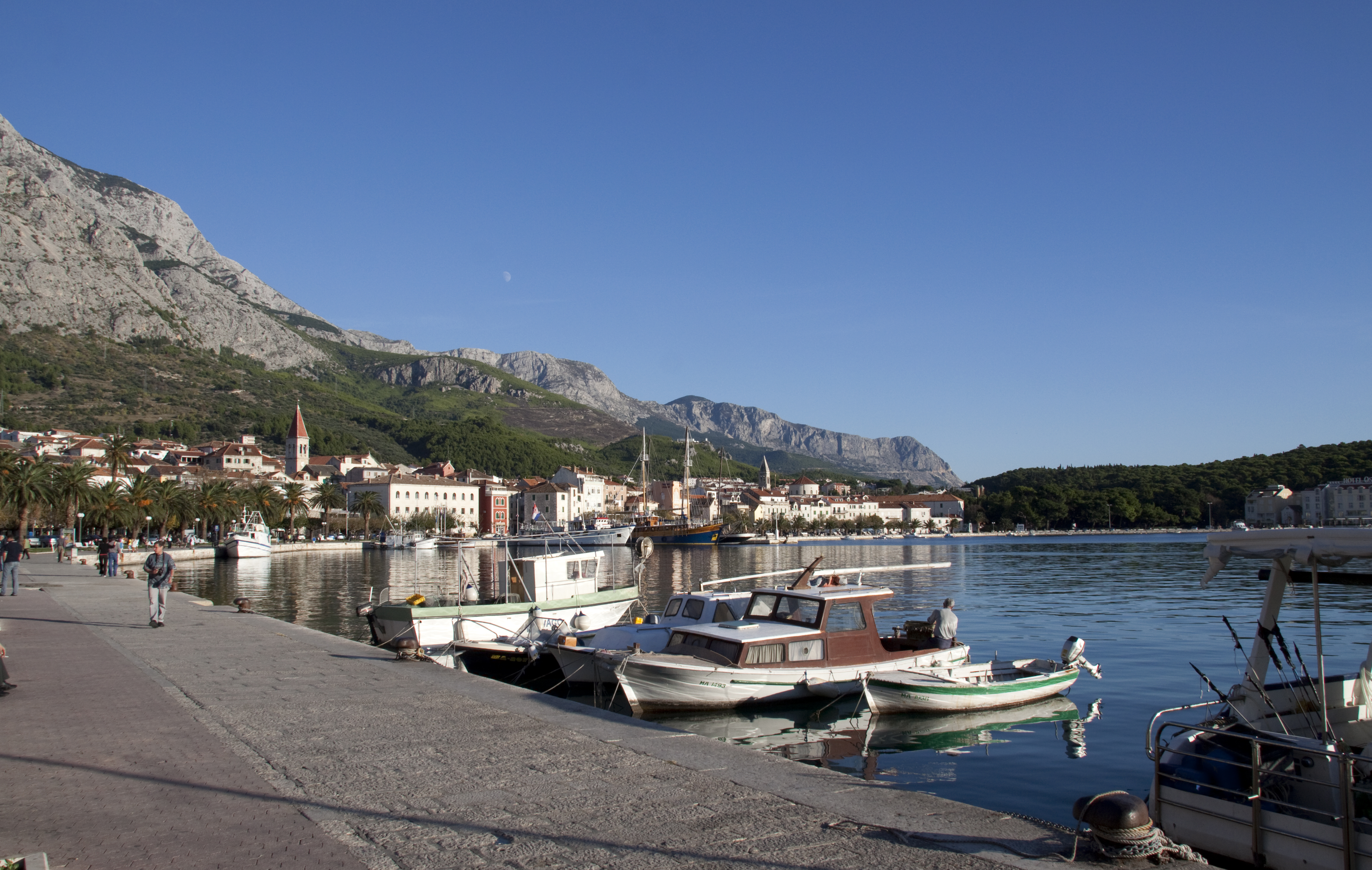
Makarska

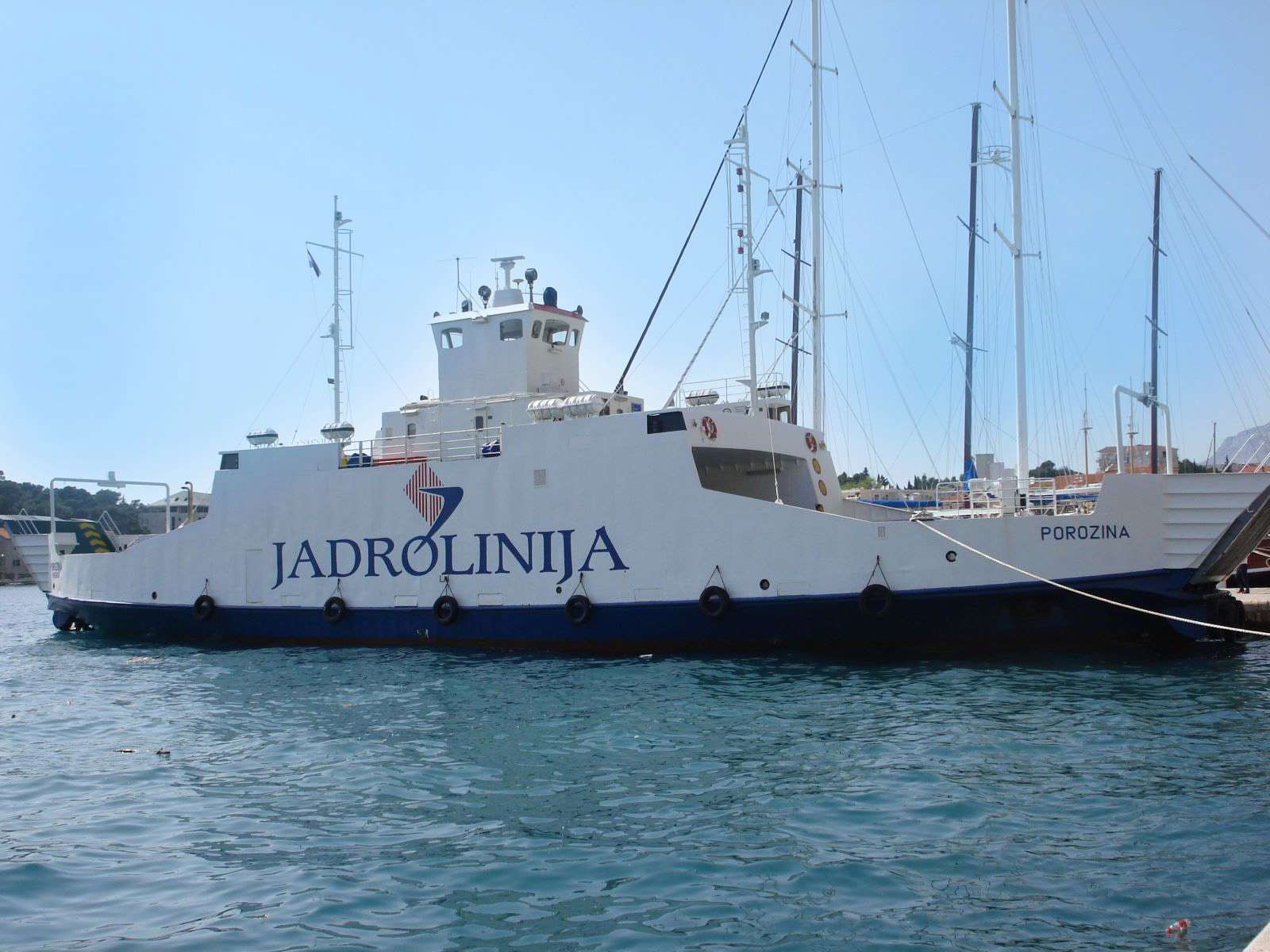
Makarska-Sumartin ferry in Makarska

D411 branches off to the south from D8 in Makarska towards Makarska ferry port - ferry access to Sumartin on Brač Island. The road is 1.5 km (0.93 mi) long.

Like all state roads in Croatia, the D411 is managed and maintained by Hrvatske ceste, state owned company.

== Traffic volume ==
Traffic is not regularly counted on the road, however, Hrvatske ceste report number of vehicles using Makarska-Sumartin ferry line, connecting D411 to the D113 state road. Furthermore, the D411 road carries considerable local traffic in Makarska itself, which does not use the ferry at all, greatly exceeding the ferried traffic. Substantial variations between annual (AADT) and summer (ASDT) traffic volumes are attributed to the fact that the road connects to a number of summer resorts.

D411 traffic volume
Road	Counting site	AADT	ASDT	Notes
D411	638 Makarska-Sumartin	74	220	Vehicles using Makarska-Sumartin ferry line.

== Road junctions and populated areas ==
D411 junctions/populated areas
Type	Slip roads/Notes
	Makarska; D8 to Split (to the north) and Ploče (to the south). Northern terminus of the road.
	Makarska ferry port - ferry access to Sumartin on Brač Island (D113). Southern terminus of the road.
