= Podhume =

Settlement in Split-Dalmatia County, Croatia

- Settlement
- Interactive map of Podhume
- Location of Podhume in Croatia
- Coordinates: 43°19′30″N 16°26′24″E
- Country: Croatia
- County: Split-Dalmatia
- Municipality: Milna

Area
  - Total: 2.6 km^{2} (1.0 sq mi)

Population (2021)
  - Total: 0
  - Density: 0.0/km^{2} (0.0/sq mi)
- Time zone: UTC+1 (CET)
  - Summer (DST): UTC+2 (CEST)
- Postal code: 21405 Milna
- Area code: +385 (0)21

Podhume is a settlement in the Municipality of Milna in Croatia. In 2021, its population was 0.
