= Milna, Brač =

Municipality in Split-Dalmatia County, Croatia

Milna
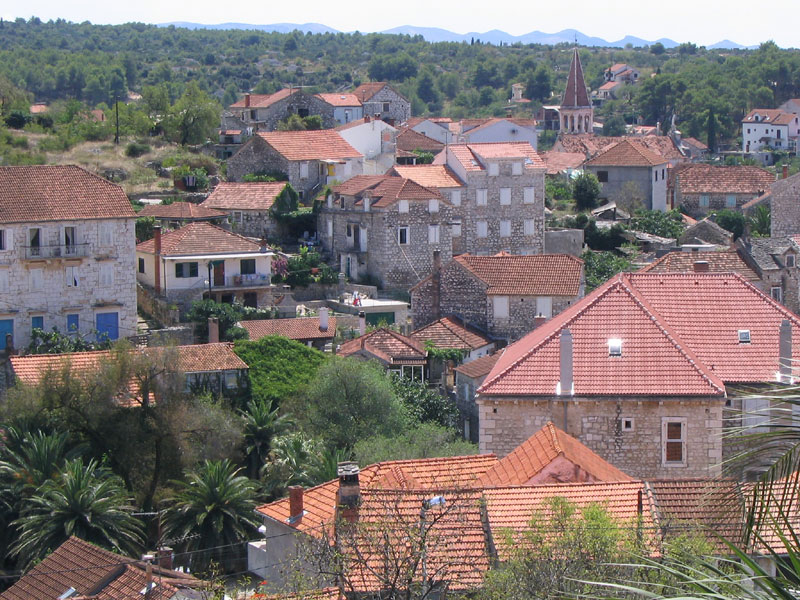
- View from the top of Dosecine street

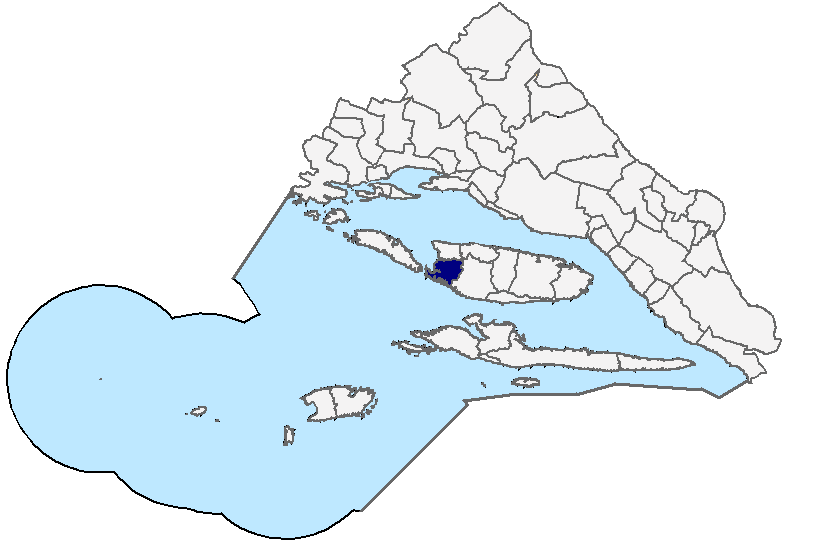
- Milna municipality within Split-Dalmatia County
- Interactive map of Milna
- Location within Croatia
- Coordinates: 43°24′00″N 16°19′36″E
- Country: Croatia
- Region: Dalmatia
- County: Split-Dalmatia County

Area
  - Total: 34.9 km^{2} (13.5 sq mi)

Population (2021)
  - Total: 931
  - Density: 26.7/km^{2} (69.1/sq mi)
- Time zone: UTC+1 (CET)
  - Summer (DST): UTC+2 (CEST)
- Postal code: 21405 Milna
- Area code: +385 (0)21
- Website: opcinamilna.hr

Milna is a village and municipality on the western side of the island of Brač, Split-Dalmatia County, Croatia.

It is situated in a deep bay oriented towards the island of Mrduja and Split Channel, on the west. The village was settled in the 16th century, by shepherds from Nerežišća.

Milna is notable for being the sole location on the island where the Chakavian dialect is spoken. Milna was attacked during the Battle of the Dalmatian channels on November 14, 1991, and it is the only settlement on Brač that have been directly attacked during the Croatian War of Independence.

Our Lady of the Annunciation Church

== Demographics ==
In the 2021 census, the municipality had a total population of 931, in the following settlements:

- Bobovišća, population 15
- Bobovišća na Moru, population 49
- Ložišća, population 92
- Milna, population 775
- Podhume
Milna: Population trends 1857–2021
v

population	3223	3814	3994	4500	4677	3945	3243	2664	1919	1865	1760	1416	1102	1118	1100	1034	931
	1857	1869	1880	1890	1900	1910	1921	1931	1948	1953	1961	1971	1981	1991	2001	2011	2021

Sources: Croatian Bureau of Statistics publications
