= Brač Channel =

Coordinates: 43°23′43″N 16°40′22″E

Location
- Interactive map of Brač Channel

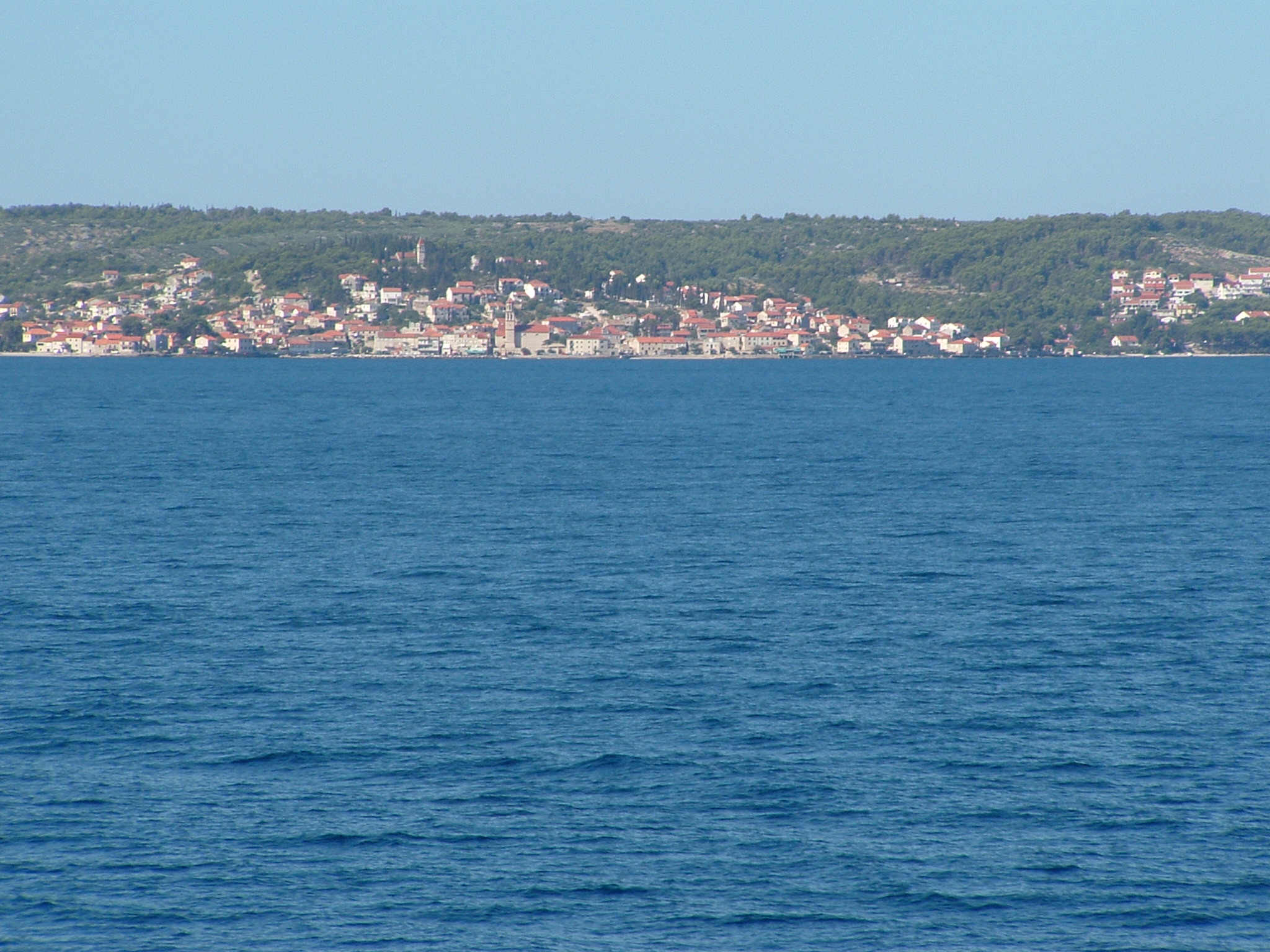
The island of Brac, 2025

The Brač Channel (Croatian: Brački kanal) is a channel in the Adriatic Sea between the Dalmatian mainland and the island of Brač.

== Sources ==
- Brački kanal (in Croatian)
