= Bobovišća na Moru =

Settlement in Split-Dalmatia County, Croatia

- Settlement
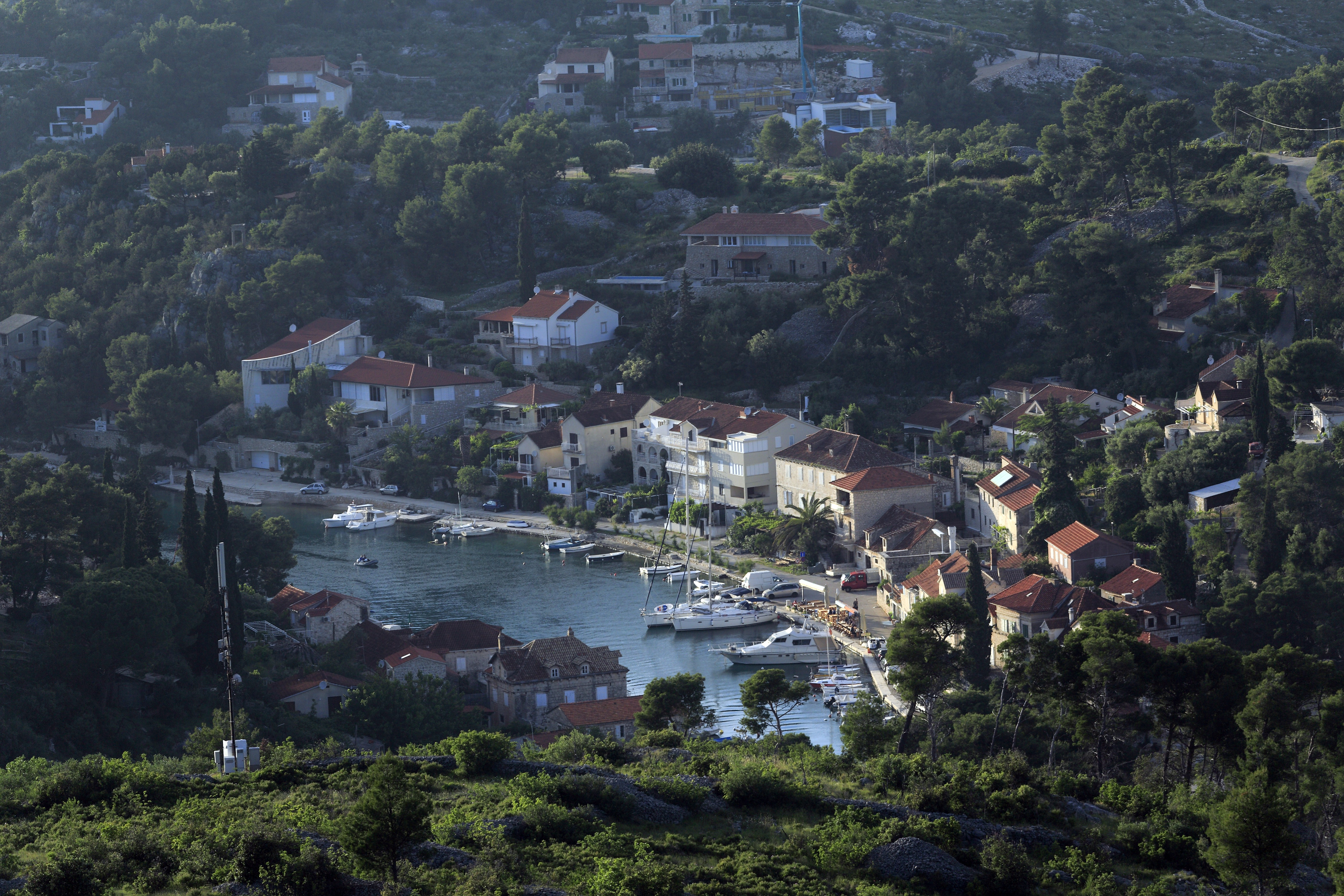
- Interactive map of Bobovišća na Moru
- Location of Bobovišća na Moru in Croatia
- Coordinates: 43°20′59″N 16°27′52″E
- Country: Croatia
- County: Split-Dalmatia
- Municipality: Milna

Area
  - Total: 1.3 km^{2} (0.50 sq mi)

Population (2021)
  - Total: 49
  - Density: 38/km^{2} (98/sq mi)
- Time zone: UTC+1 (CET)
  - Summer (DST): UTC+2 (CEST)
- Postal code: 21405 Milna
- Area code: +385 (0)21

Bobovišća na Moru is a settlement in the Municipality of Milna in Croatia. In 2021, its population was 49.

== Demographics ==
Bobovišća na Moru: Population trends 1857–2021
v

population	424	1561	498	617	625	433		244	166	137	102	75	52	62	71	65	49
	1857	1869	1880	1890	1900	1910	1921	1931	1948	1953	1961	1971	1981	1991	2001	2011	2021

Sources: Croatian Bureau of Statistics publications

== Landmarks ==
- Vičja luka, one of the most important localities with findings of the Illyrian-Greek civilization in Croatia in general
- Kaštel Gligo, fortified residential complex from the 17th century
- House Nazor, a house from 1817
- Vladimir Nazor's house and the complex of houses around it
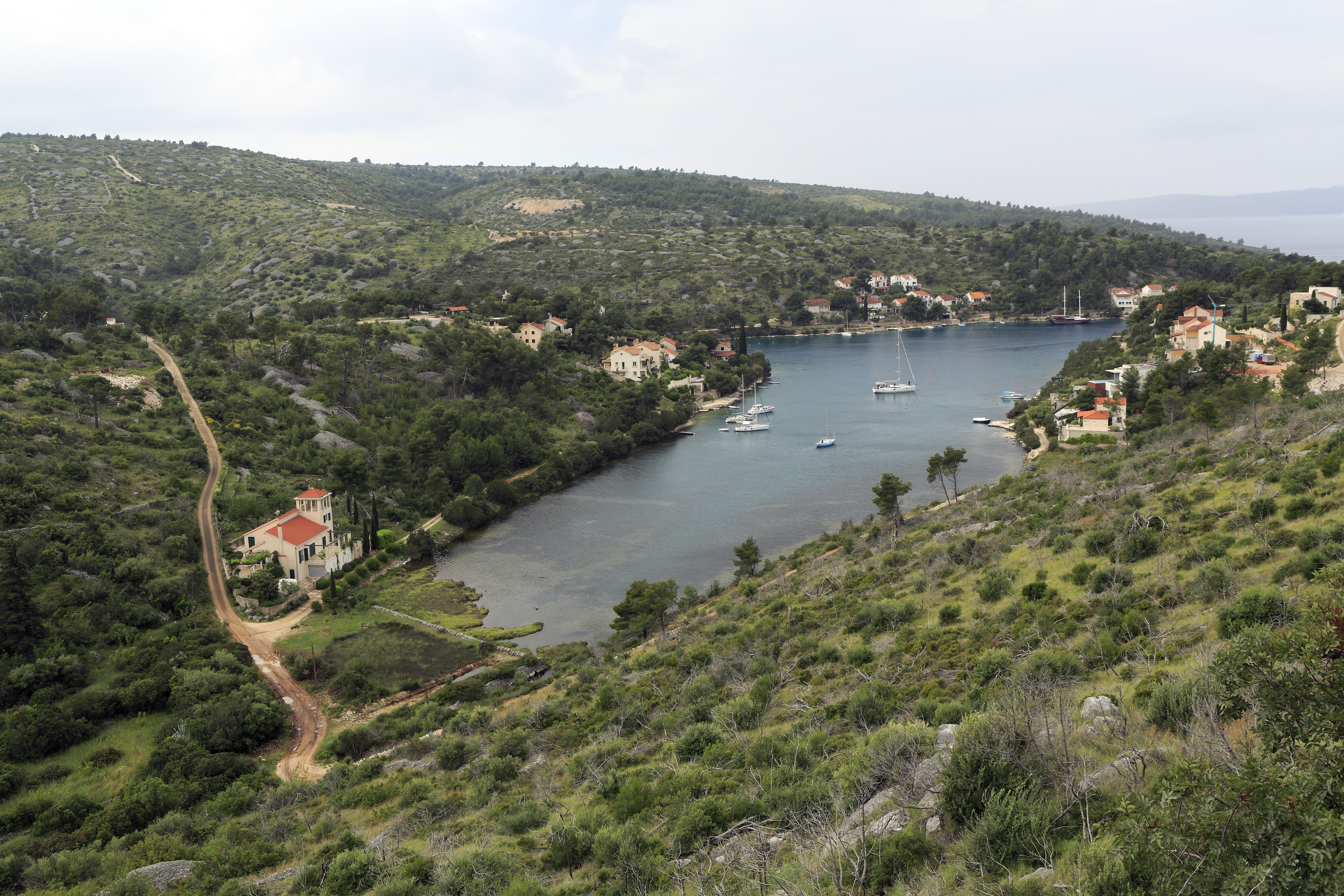
Vičja luka

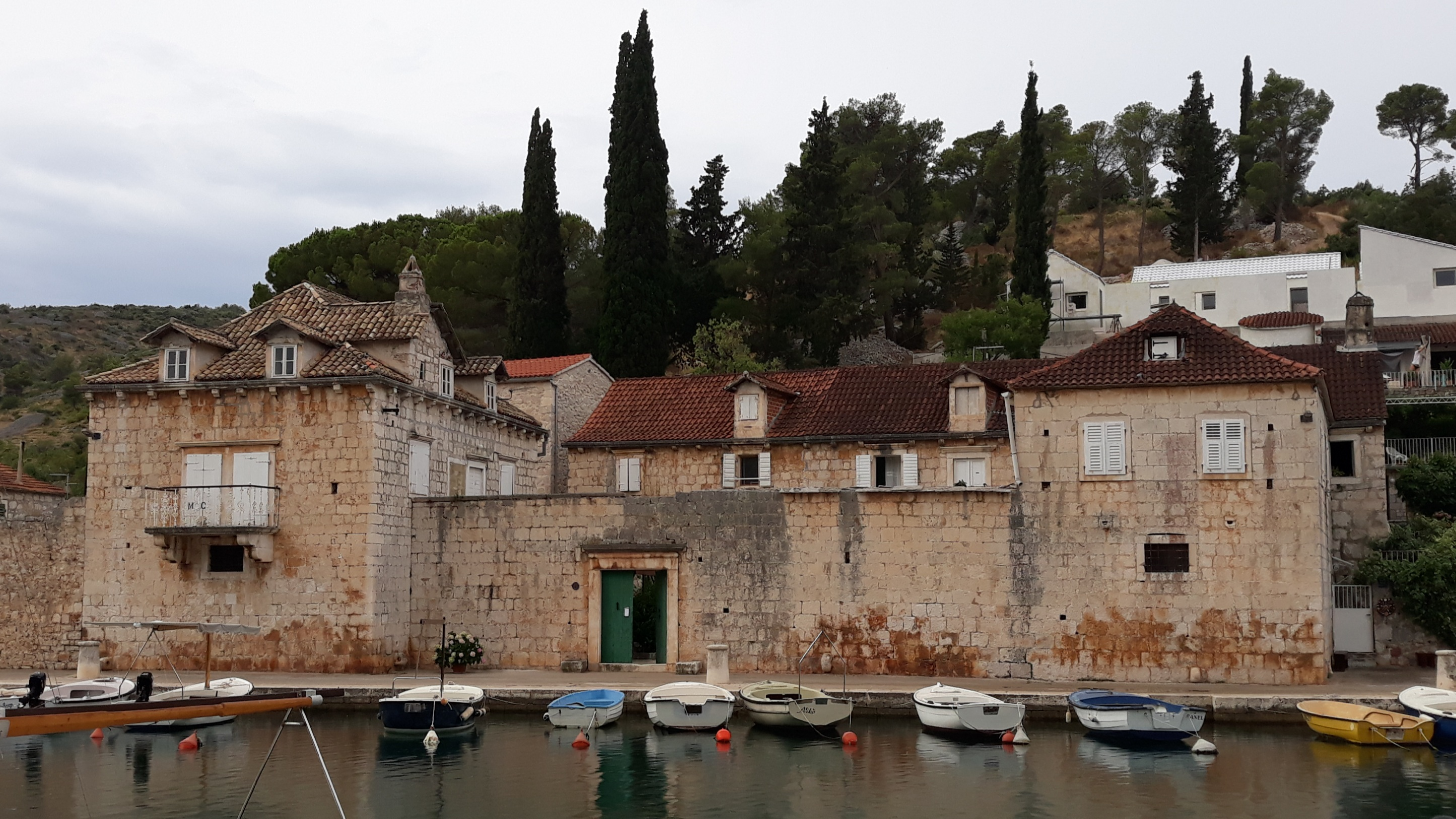
Kaštel Gligo

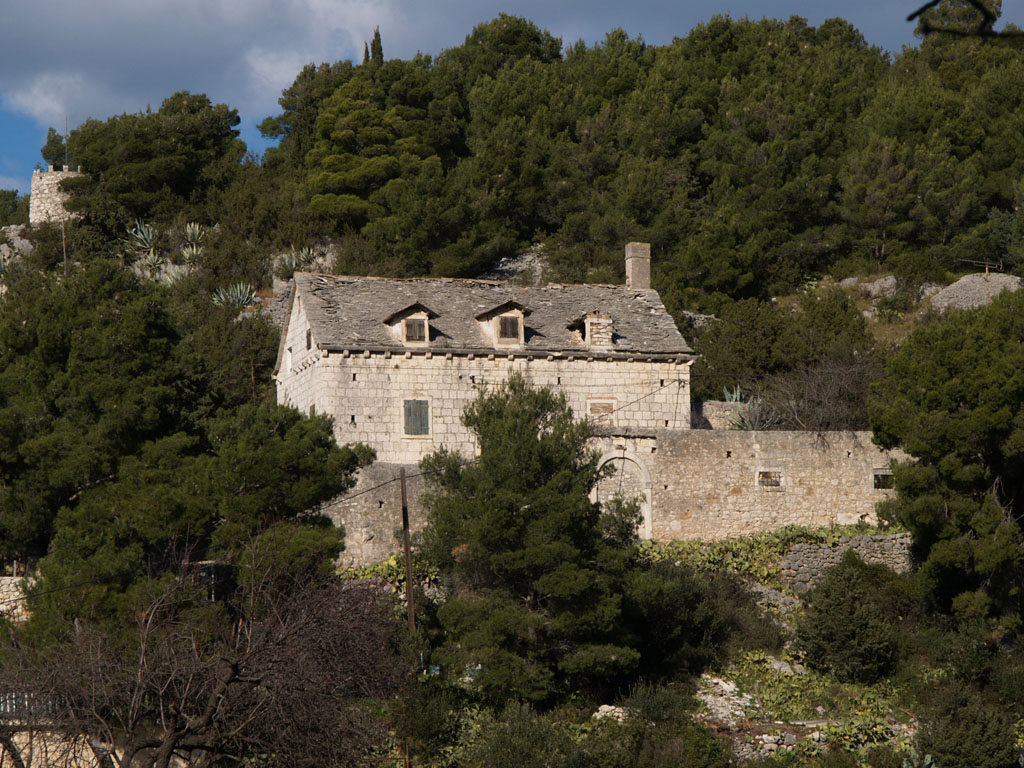
House Nazor

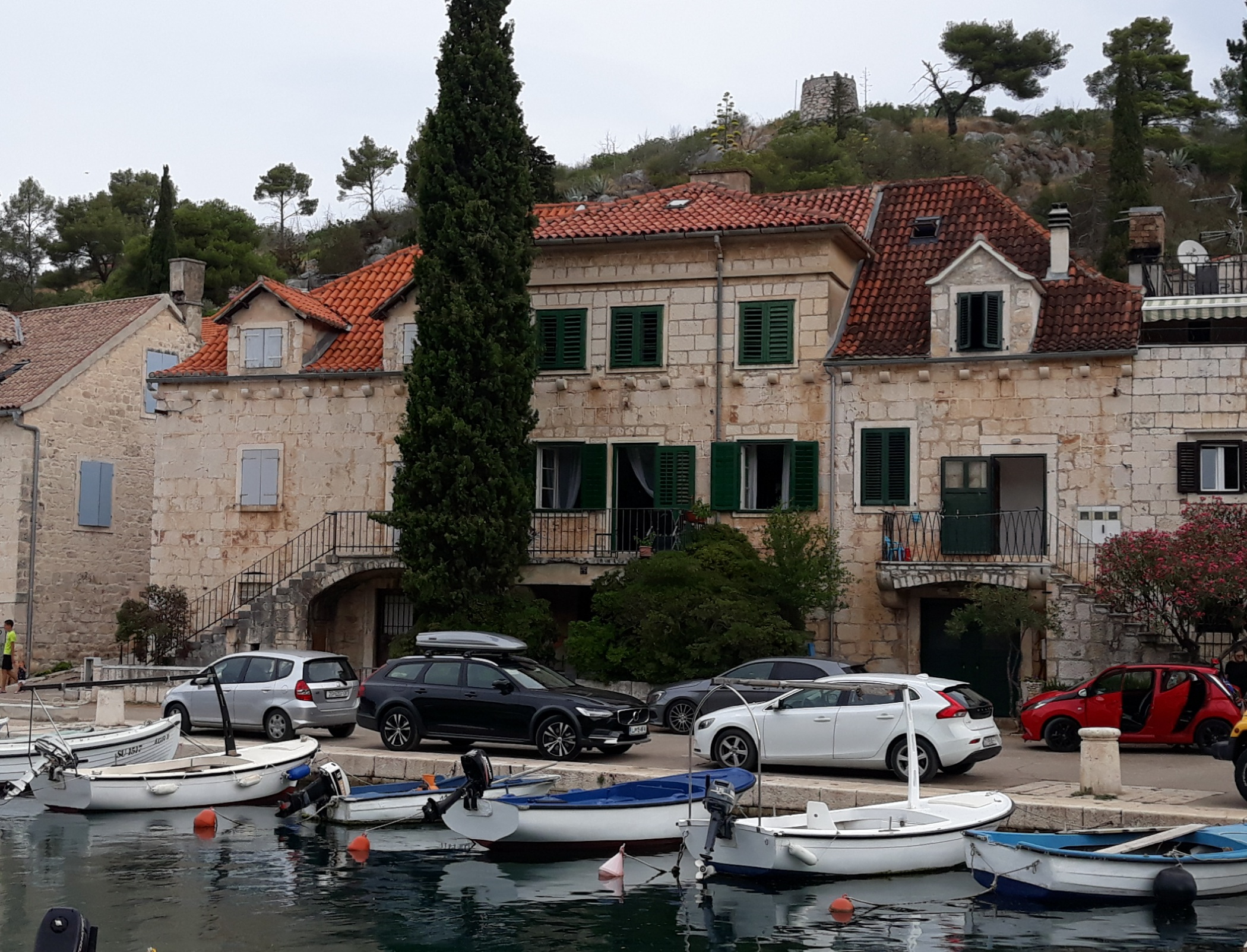
Vladimir Nazor's house
