= Dračevica, Croatia =

Coordinates: 43°20′N 16°32′E

Dračevica
- Village
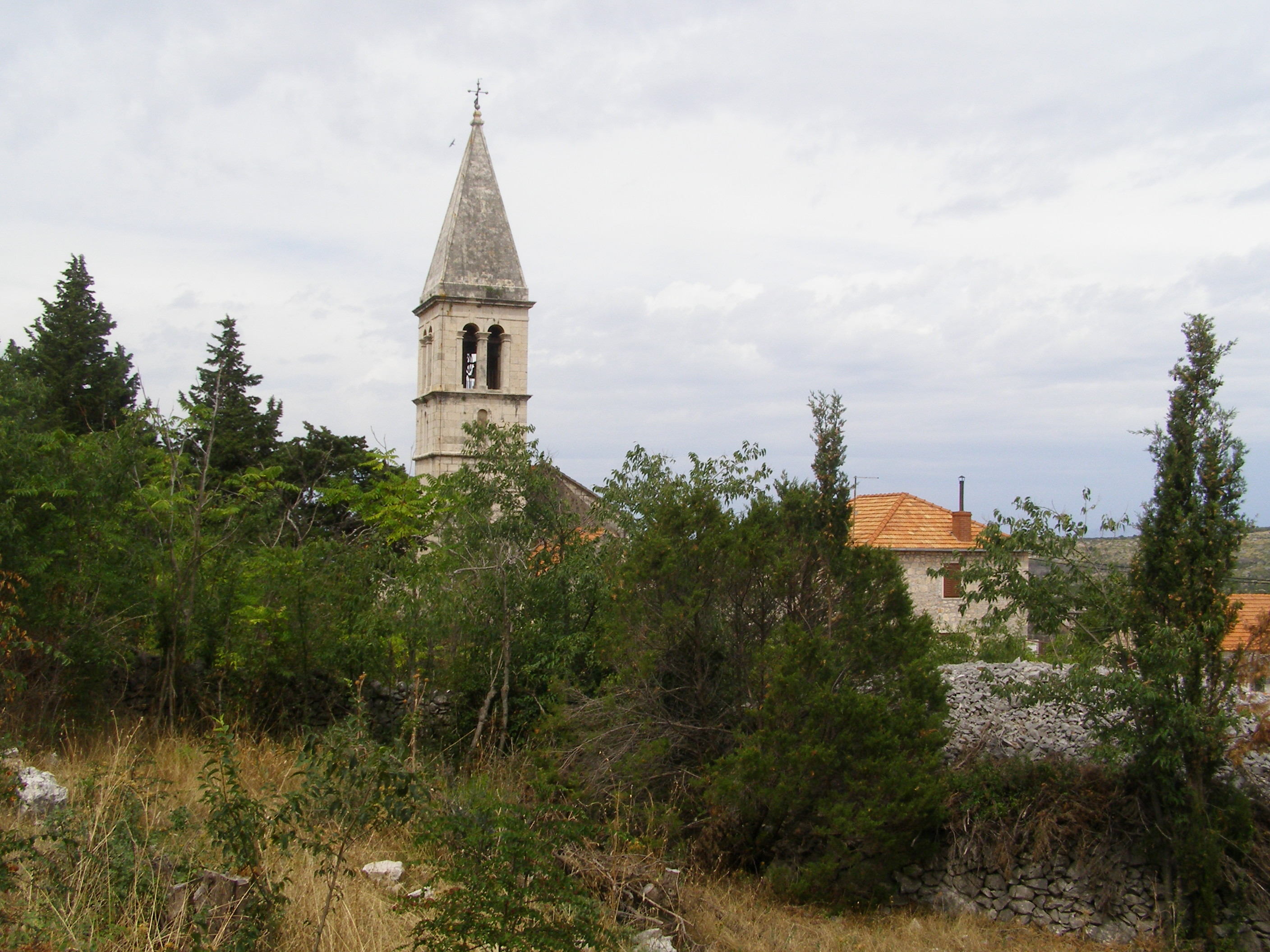
- Interactive map of Dračevica
- Country: Croatia
- County: Split-Dalmatia County
- Municipality: Municipality of Nerežišća

Area
  - Total: 7.5 km^{2} (2.9 sq mi)

Population (2021)
  - Total: 63
  - Density: 8.4/km^{2} (22/sq mi)
- Time zone: UTC+1 (CET)
  - Summer (DST): UTC+2 (CEST)

Dračevica (Croatian pronunciation: [drâtʃevit͡sa]) is a village on the island of Brač.

As of December 2018, 59 people live in the village year-round. In December of 2018, an anonymous donor gifted a 500 kuna voucher to all permanent residents of the village.
