= Gornji Humac =

- Village
- Location within Croatia
- Coordinates: 43°18′N 16°43′E
- Country: Croatia
- County: Split-Dalmatia County
- Municipality: Pučišća

Area
  - Total: 36.7 km^{2} (14.2 sq mi)

Population (2021)
  - Total: 276
  - Density: 7.52/km^{2} (19.5/sq mi)
- Time zone: UTC+1 (CET)
  - Summer (DST): UTC+2 (CEST)

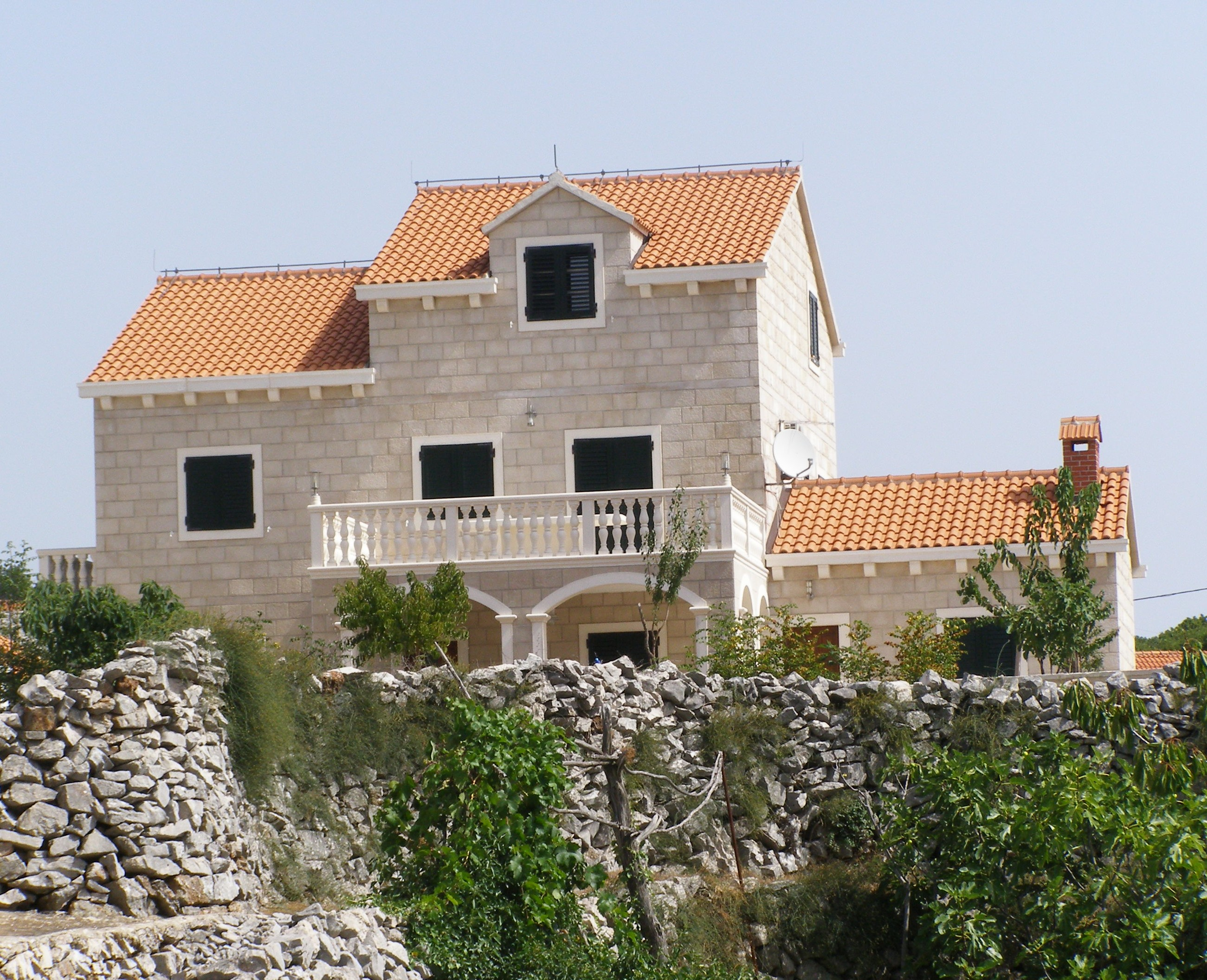
Gornji Humac, Brac, Croatia

Gornji Humac is a village in Croatia on the island of Brač. It is connected by the D113 highway.

On March 8, 1944, German troops executed 24 local men from the town of Gornji Humac, including the local parish priest. For this reason, Gornji Humac is the only place in Croatia where there is no celebration of the International Women's Day on March 8.
