= Mirca, Brač =

Mirca
- Interactive map of Mirca
- Location within Croatia
- Coordinates: 43°23′N 16°31′E
- Country: Croatia
- County: Split-Dalmatia
- City: Supetar

Area
  - Total: 6.3 km^{2} (2.4 sq mi)

Population (2021)
  - Total: 401
  - Density: 64/km^{2} (160/sq mi)
- Time zone: UTC+1 (CET)
  - Summer (DST): UTC+2 (CEST)

Mirca (population 401) is a town on the north side of the island of Brač in Croatia. Administratively it is part of the city of Supetar.

People on Brač, and in Mirca, used to be into commercial fishing and typical Mediterranean agriculture (vineyards and wine; almonds; olive oil and such). In the last few decades the tourism industry took over, and a lot of people built houses with apartments and rooms to rent to the summer tourists. Many “outside” people built vacation and summer houses along the shores. In general, Mirca is rather a quiet place.

Mirca was originally positioned around half a mile inland and now spreads to the sea; thus, there is an “upper” Mirca and a “lower” Mirca. There is a small harbor and a crescent shaped pebble beach. On the eastern side of the beach, there was formerly the restaurant, “Gumonca”, and the western side ends in a flat rocky shore with the pine woods reaching the sea.

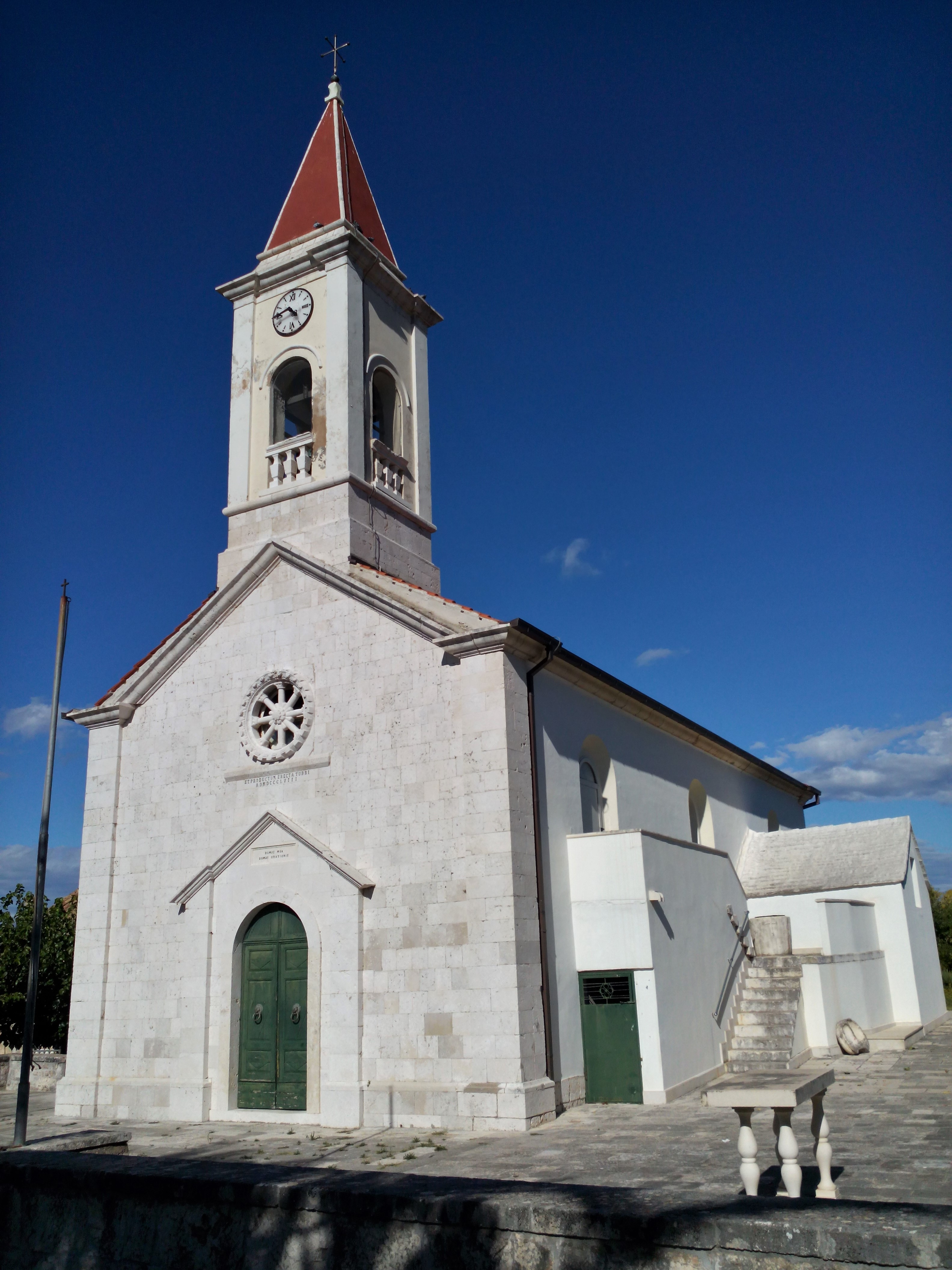
Parish Church of the Visitation of the Blessed Virgin Mary

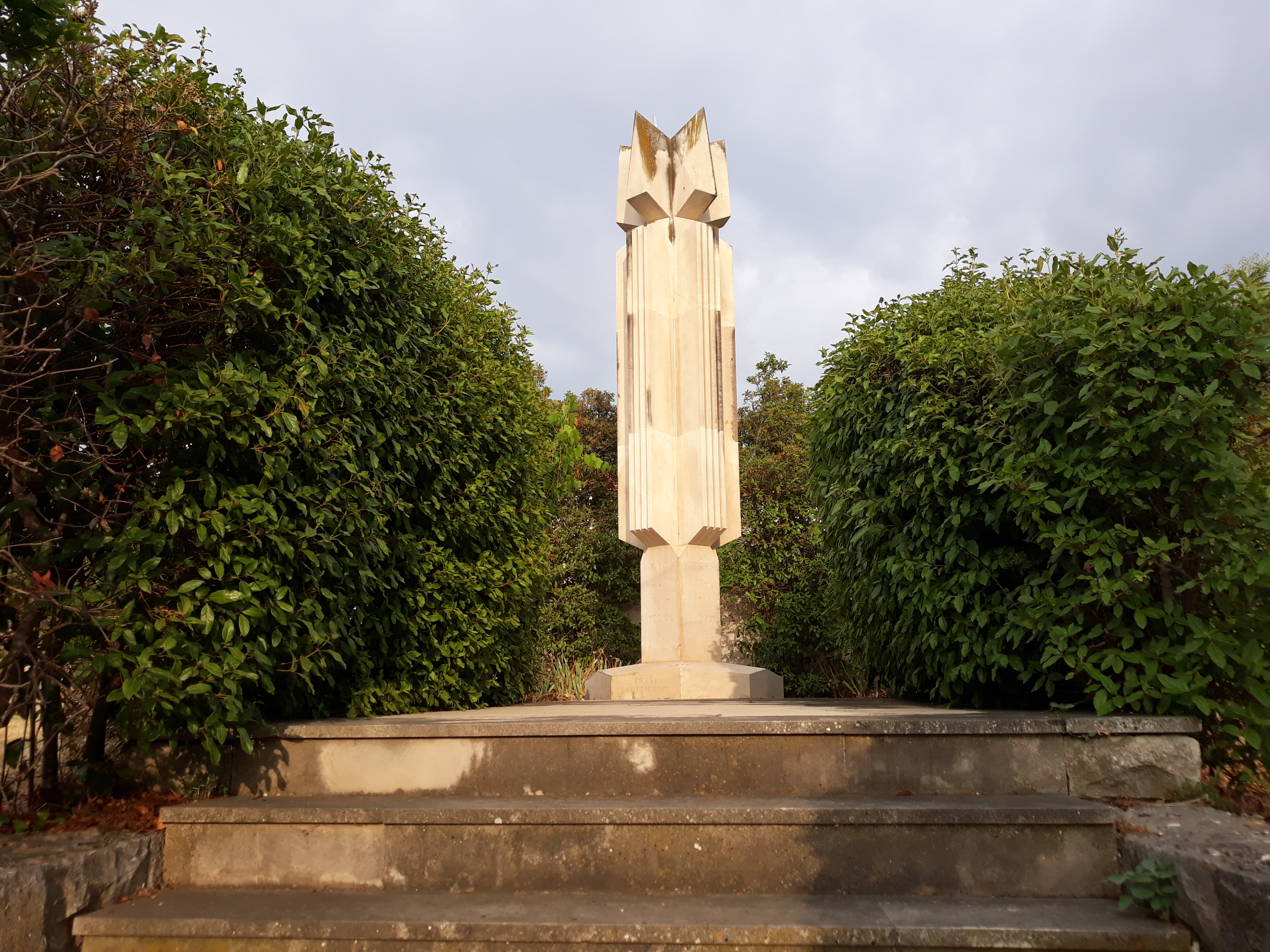
World War II memorial

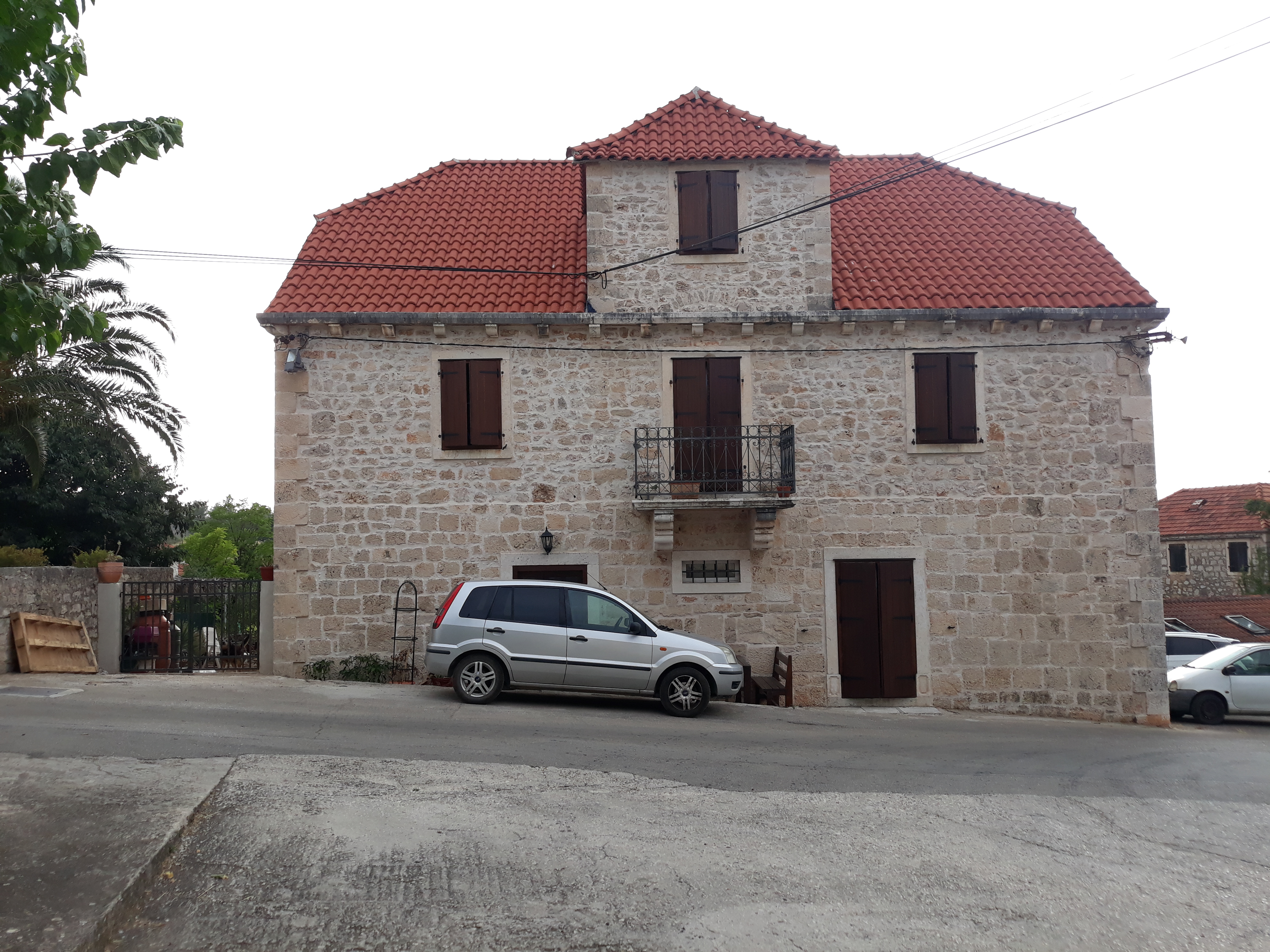

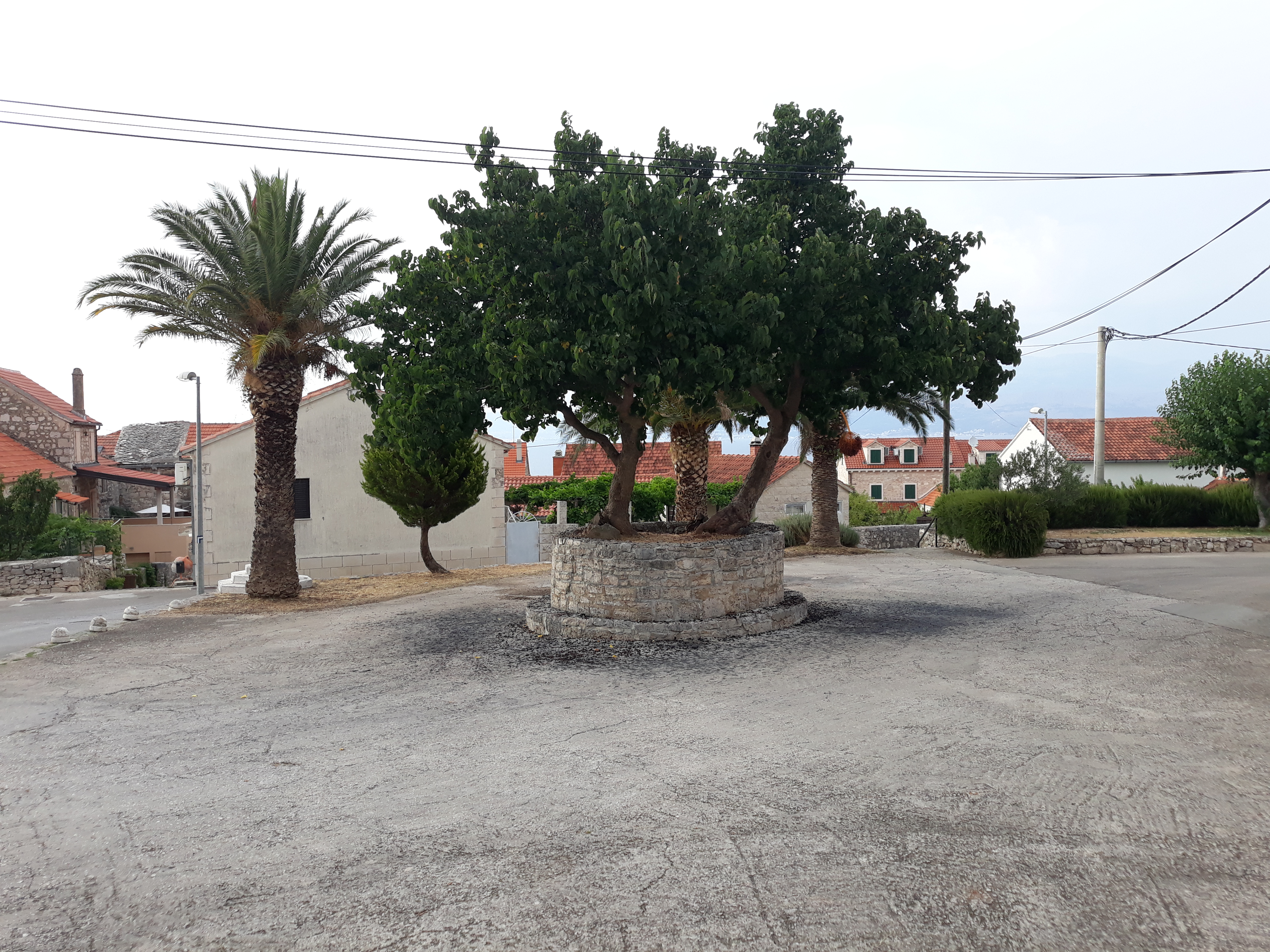
