= Ložišća =

- Village
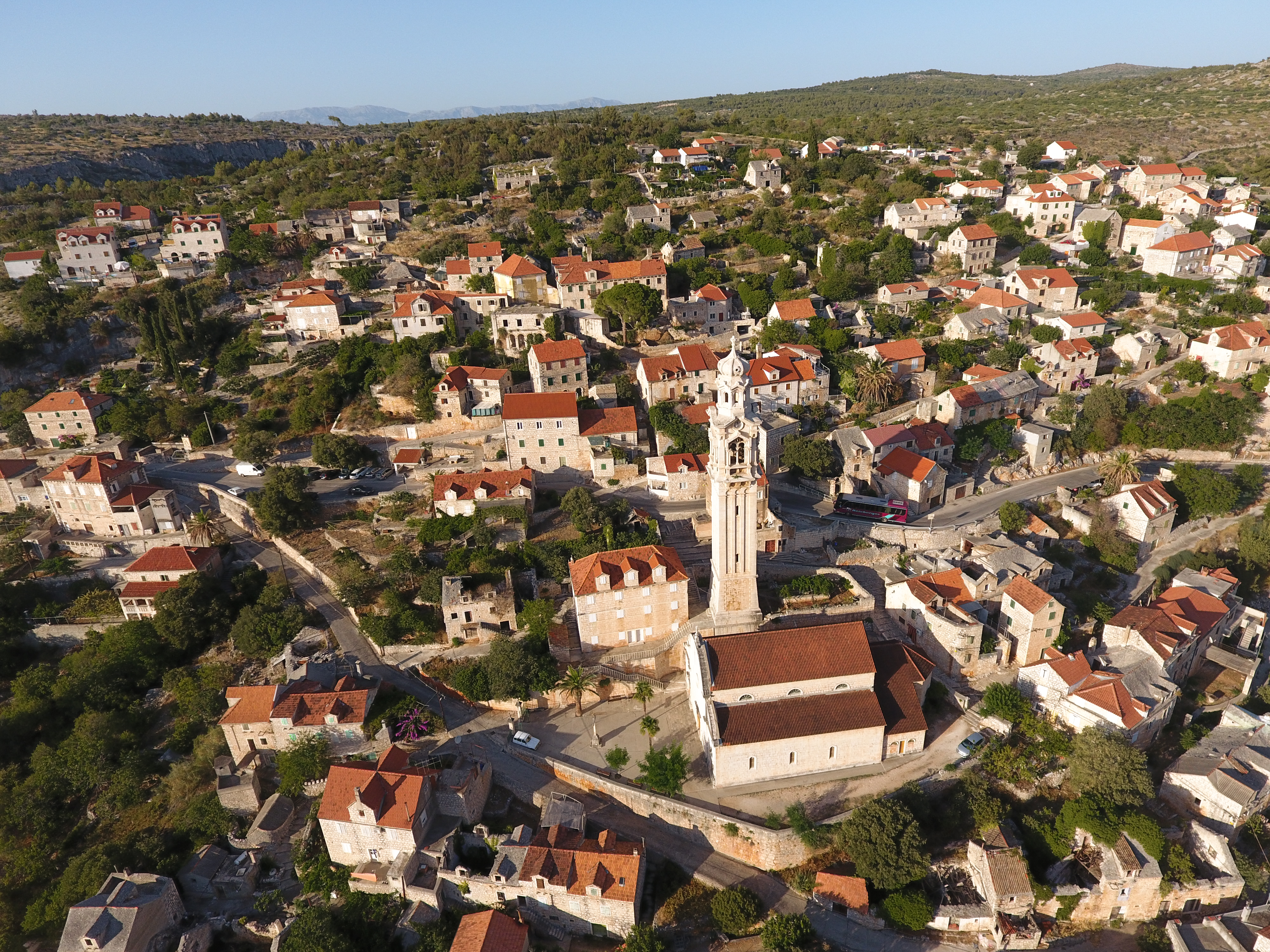
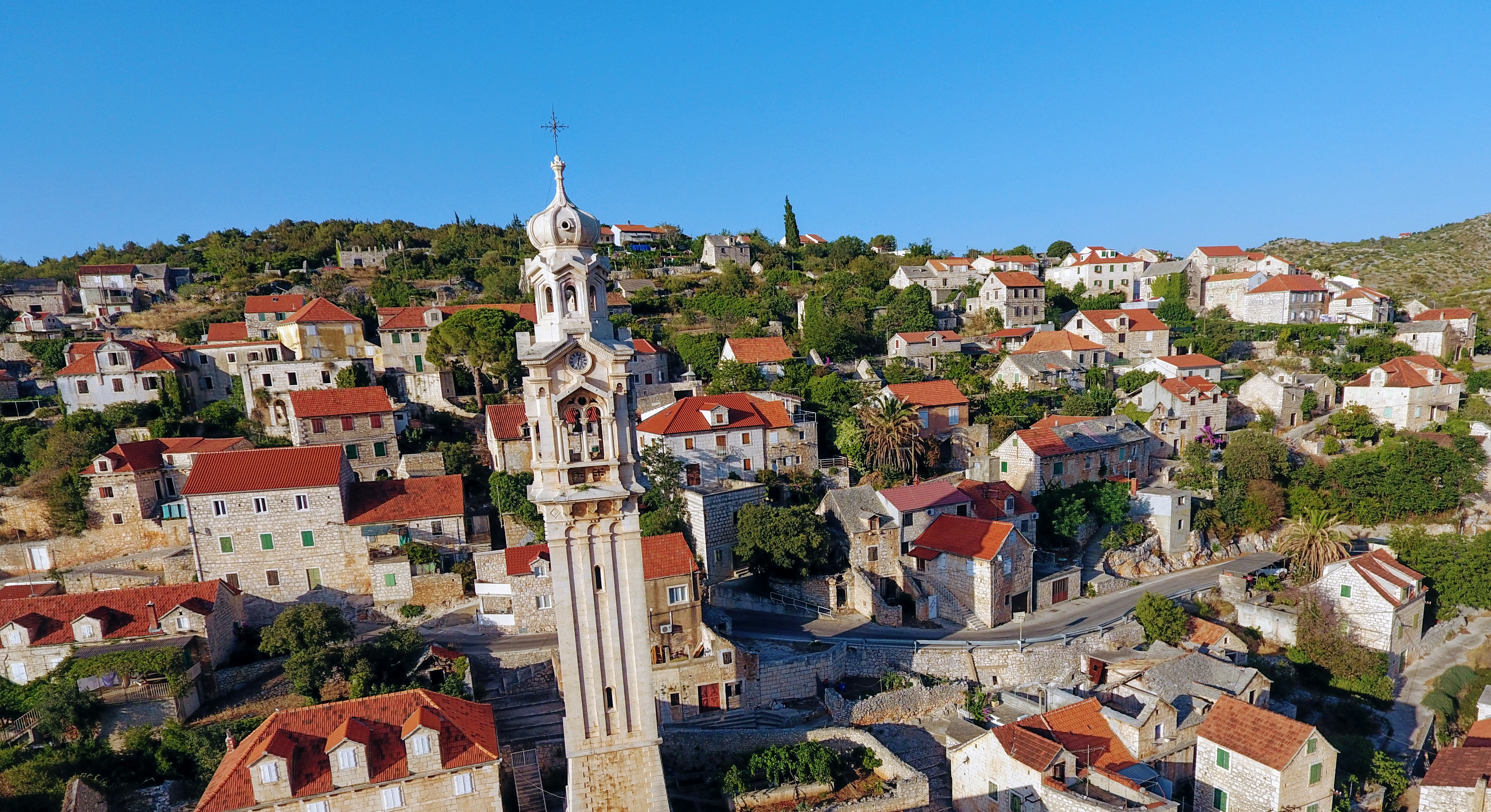

- Location within Croatia
- Coordinates: 43.3469°N 16.4803°E
- Country: Croatia
- County: Split-Dalmatia County
- Municipality: Milna

Area
  - Total: 7.5 km^{2} (2.9 sq mi)
- Elevation: 74 m (243 ft)

Population (2021)
  - Total: 92
  - Density: 12/km^{2} (32/sq mi)

Ložišća is a small settlement on the west parts of the Croatian island of Brač, population 139 (2011).
