= Nerežišća =

Municipality in Split-Dalmatia County, Croatia

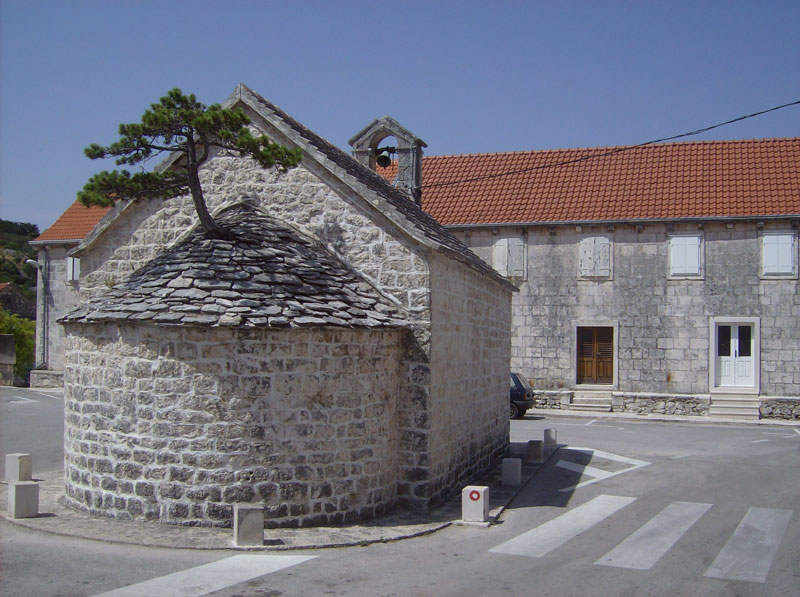
- Chapel with bonsai tree in the centre of the town

- Location within Croatia
- Coordinates: 43°20′N 16°35′E
- Country: Croatia
- Region: Dalmatia
- County: Split-Dalmatia County

Area
  - Total: 78.8 km^{2} (30.4 sq mi)

Population (2021)
  - Total: 878
  - Density: 11.1/km^{2} (28.9/sq mi)
- Time zone: UTC+1 (CET)
  - Summer (DST): UTC+2 (CEST)
- Website: nerezisca.hr

Nerežišća (Croatian pronunciation: [něreʒiːɕt͡ɕa]) is a village and a municipality on the island Brač in Croatia.

In the past, Nerežišća was the capital of the island. It was founded inside the island, not on its coast, because of fear of pirates marauding the Adriatic Sea. Once these pirates were eradicated by the Venetians, the locals started populating the settlements by the sea, especially Supetar and Sutivan, across the Brač Channel facing Split.

== Demographics ==
In the 2011 census, it had a total population of 862, in the following settlements:

- Donji Humac, population 157
- Dračevica, population 89
- Nerežišća, population 616

In the same census, 98.84% were Croats.

Nerežišća: Population trends 1857–2021
v

population	1655	2029	2144	2547	2836	2619	1914	1900	1615	1512	1350	1105	1001	1013	868	862	878
	1857	1869	1880	1890	1900	1910	1921	1931	1948	1953	1961	1971	1981	1991	2001	2011	2021

Sources: Croatian Bureau of Statistics publications
