= Sumartin =

- Village
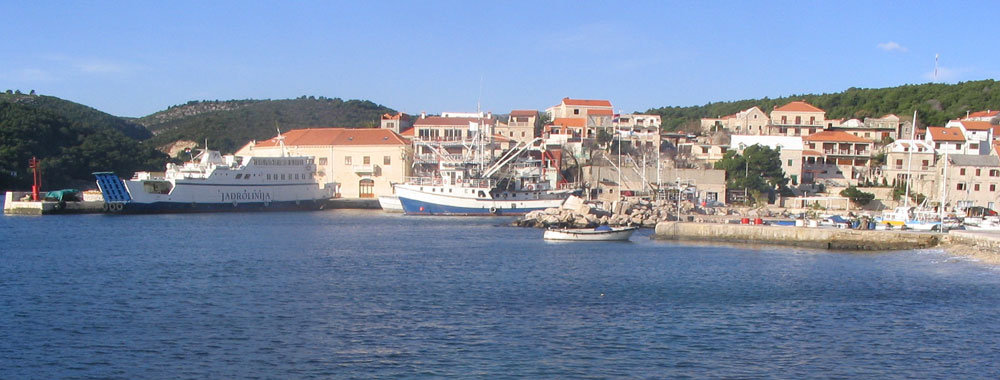

- Location of Sumartin in Croatia
- Coordinates: 43°17′14″N 16°52′20″E
- Country: Croatia
- Region: Split-Dalmatia County
- County: Brač

Area
  - Total: 6.1 km^{2} (2.4 sq mi)
- Elevation: 7 m (23 ft)

Population (2021)
  - Total: 477
  - Density: 78/km^{2} (200/sq mi)
- Time zone: UTC+1 (CET)
  - Summer (DST): UTC+2 (CEST)
- Postal code: 21420
- Area code: (+385) 21
- Vehicle registration: ST

Sumartin (Croatian pronunciation: [sûmartin], previously known as Sv. Martin) is a port village in Croatia on the island of Brač. It is the youngest village on the island of Brač and administratively belongs to the Municipality of Selca. According to the 2011 census, it has a population of 491. The village was founded on 11 November 1646—the feast day of Saint Martin—by the refugees from the Dalmatian coast and Bosnia and Herzegovina who fled from the Ottomans. It is connected by the D113 highway and by ferry.

== History ==
Sumartin was established at the time of the Cretan War (1645–69), also known as the War of Candia, in 1646, when a group of Franciscan friars accompanied by a number of refugees reached the easternmost tip of the island of Brač by boats as they were fleeing from Makarska Riviera due to Ottoman raids. The newly formed village was established around the already existing abandoned small church of St. Martin which had been previously damaged but repaired by the refugees upon their arrival.

As the settlement was growing in size, Franciscan friars decided to stay and began receiving more lands, encouraged by Venetian military officer Leonardo Foscolo who endowed them by a special document highlighting their merits. Meanwhile, the local population gained momentum in developing and expanding their settlement by cultivating surrounding fields and vineyards. The development of the settlement can be noticed in the church visitations which mention the following number of inhabitants of the settlement over the course of several decades: 104 in 1678, 200 in 1702, 300 in 1712, 352 in 1760, and finally 370 in 1764. Population continued to grow until 1784 when a plague struck the village, halving the number of inhabitants.

Meanwhile, in 1738, the monastic choir in Sinj declared the monastic community of Sumartin as the real monastery. This act influenced the further development of the newly formed village, and the desires to build a large enough building which would serve as a monastery were growing bigger. The construction finally commenced in 1747 as the foundation of a Franciscan friary was laid down by a famous Croatian poet fra Andrija Kačić Miošić. The monastery was erected at the same place where the small medieval church of St. Martin was located. Since he was a monk himself, Andrija Kačić Miošić spent several years of his life in Sumartin (1745–1750).

== Climate ==
Since records began in 1998, the highest temperature recorded at the local weather station was 38.8 °C (101.8 °F), on 4 August 2013. The coldest temperature was −6.4 °C (20.5 °F), on 8 January 2017.

== Sources ==
- Brački zbornik br. 6, Dasen Vrsalović-Povijest otoka Brača, Skupština općine Brač, Supetar 1968.
