= Sutivan =

Municipality in Split-Dalmatia County, Croatia

- Municipality
- Interactive map of Sutivan
- Location of Sutivan in Croatia
- Coordinates: 43°23′N 16°29′E
- Country: Croatia
- Region: Dalmatia
- County: Split-Dalmatia County

Area
  - Municipality: 21.8 km^{2} (8.4 sq mi)
  - Urban: 21.8 km^{2} (8.4 sq mi)

Population (2021)
  - Municipality: 936
  - Density: 42.9/km^{2} (111/sq mi)
  - Urban: 936
  - Urban density: 42.9/km^{2} (111/sq mi)
- Website: sutivan.hr

Sutivan (Croatian pronunciation: [sûtivaːn]) is a town on the island of Brač, Split-Dalmatia County, Croatia. It has a population of 759 (2001 census), 93% of which are Croats.

Sutivan was a fishing village and the harbour is still used by local fishermen. Today Sutivan has become a popular place for cyclists. Every year the town hosts a cycling race ‘Uvati Vitar’ (Catch the Wind) where entrants arrive from all over the world

== Climate ==
Since records began in 1981, the highest temperature recorded at the local weather station was 40.4 °C (104.7 °F), on 24 July 2007. The coldest temperature was −6.3 °C (20.7 °F), on 9 January 1987.

== Demographics ==
Sutivan: Population trends 1857–2021
v

population	1556	1666	1798	1880	1746	1505	1624	962	713	704	641	584	601	641	759	822	936
	1857	1869	1880	1890	1900	1910	1921	1931	1948	1953	1961	1971	1981	1991	2001	2011	2021

Sources: Croatian Bureau of Statistics publications
