= Postira =

Village and municipality in Split-Dalmatia County, Croatia

- Village
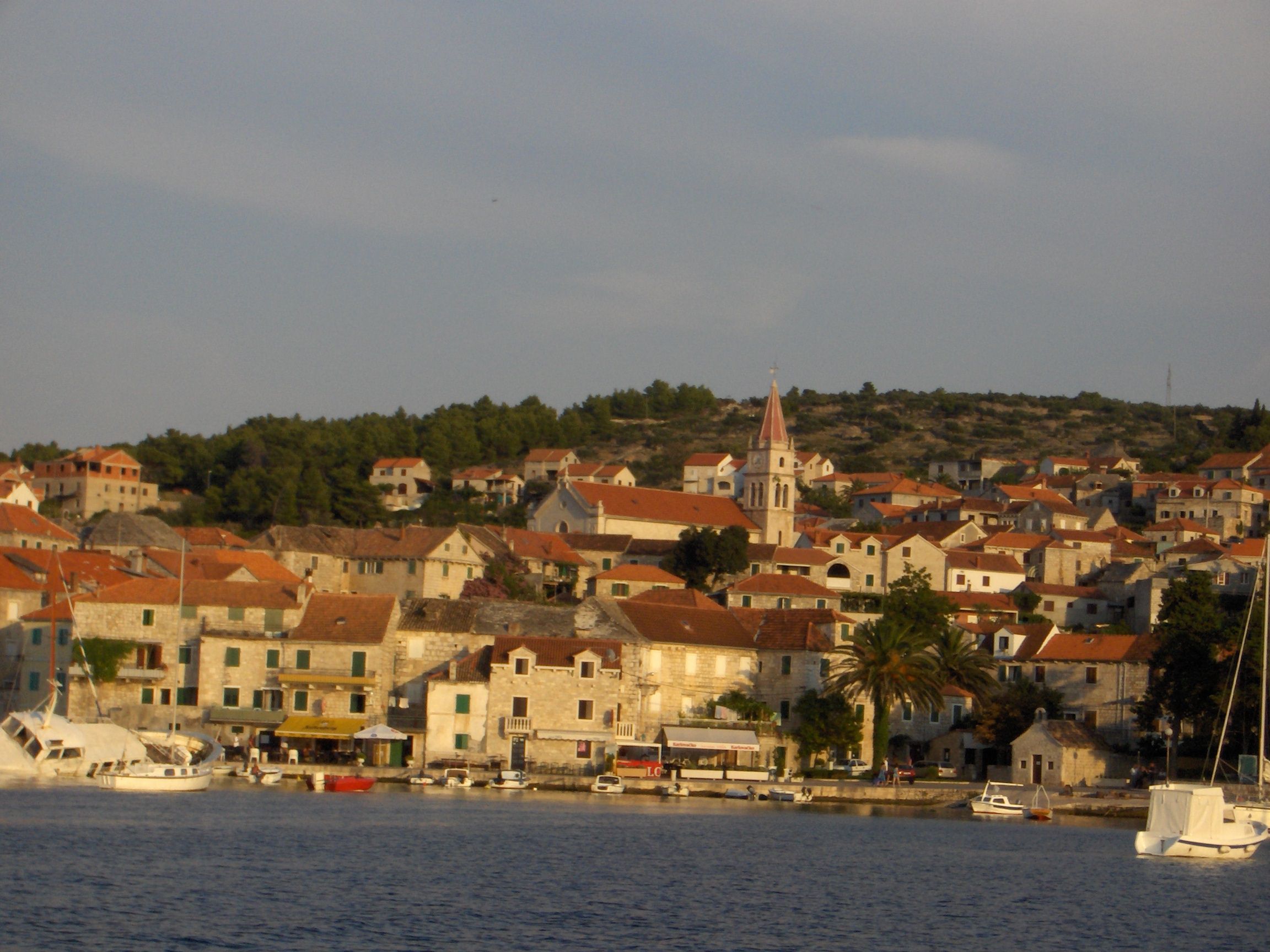
- Port in Postira with church

- Location of Postira within Croatia
- Coordinates: 43°22′N 16°37′E
- Country: Croatia
- Region: Dalmatia
- County: Split-Dalmatia County
- Island: Brač

Area
  - Village: 46.9 km^{2} (18.1 sq mi)
  - Urban: 10.1 km^{2} (3.9 sq mi)

Population (2021)
  - Village: 1,538
  - Density: 32.8/km^{2} (84.9/sq mi)
  - Urban: 1,431
  - Urban density: 142/km^{2} (367/sq mi)
- Time zone: UTC+1 (CET)
  - Summer (DST): UTC+2 (CEST)
- Postal code: 21400 Supetar
- Area code: 021
- Website: opcina-postira.hr

Postira is a village and a municipality in Croatia in the Split-Dalmatia County on the island of Brač.

== Geography ==
The village of Postira is located on the northern coast of the island of Brač, eight kilometers from the island's port of Supetar. It is connected with nearby villages Pučišća, Splitska and Dol as well as with the city of Supetar with paved road, where local bus lines operate.

== Demographics ==
In 2021, the municipality had 1538 residents in the following 2 settlements:

- Dol, population 107
- Postira, population 1,431
Postira: Population trends 1857–2021
v

population	1605	1780	1978	2158	2244	2117	1710	1677	1587	1613	1758	1632	1465	1495	1553	1559	1538
	1857	1869	1880	1890	1900	1910	1921	1931	1948	1953	1961	1971	1981	1991	2001	2011	2021

Sources: Croatian Bureau of Statistics publications

In the 2011 census, 98.5% of the population were Croats.

== History ==
Postira was first mentioned in the 14th century. It is assumed that its name come from the Latin pastura. Several stone buildings and palaces speak of the rich merchant history of the village, most of which are still standing. They were built using the special Brač stone from the surrounding quarries.

== Economy ==
The main activities are fishing, agriculture, and tourism.

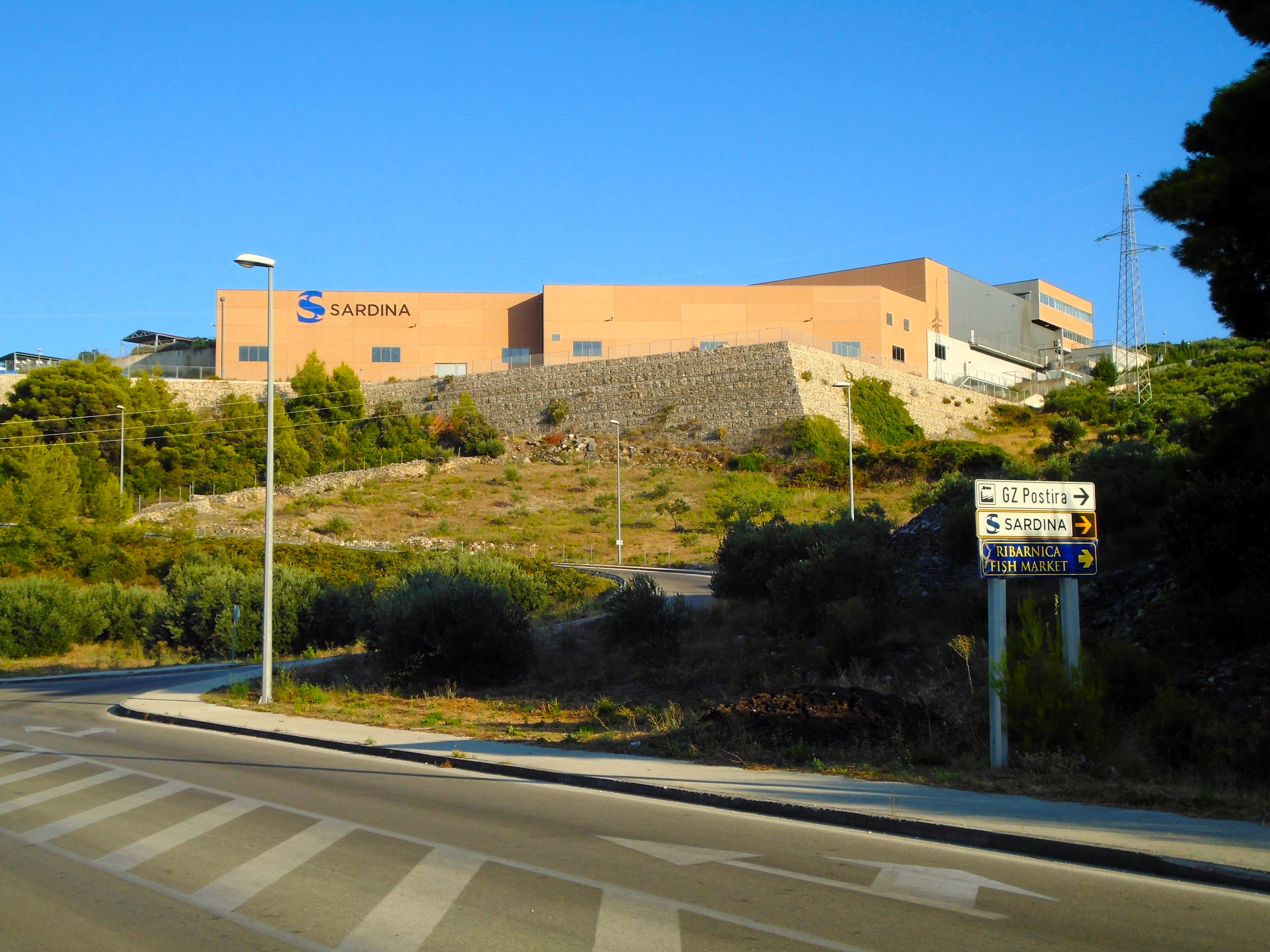
Sardina, fish processing factory in Postira

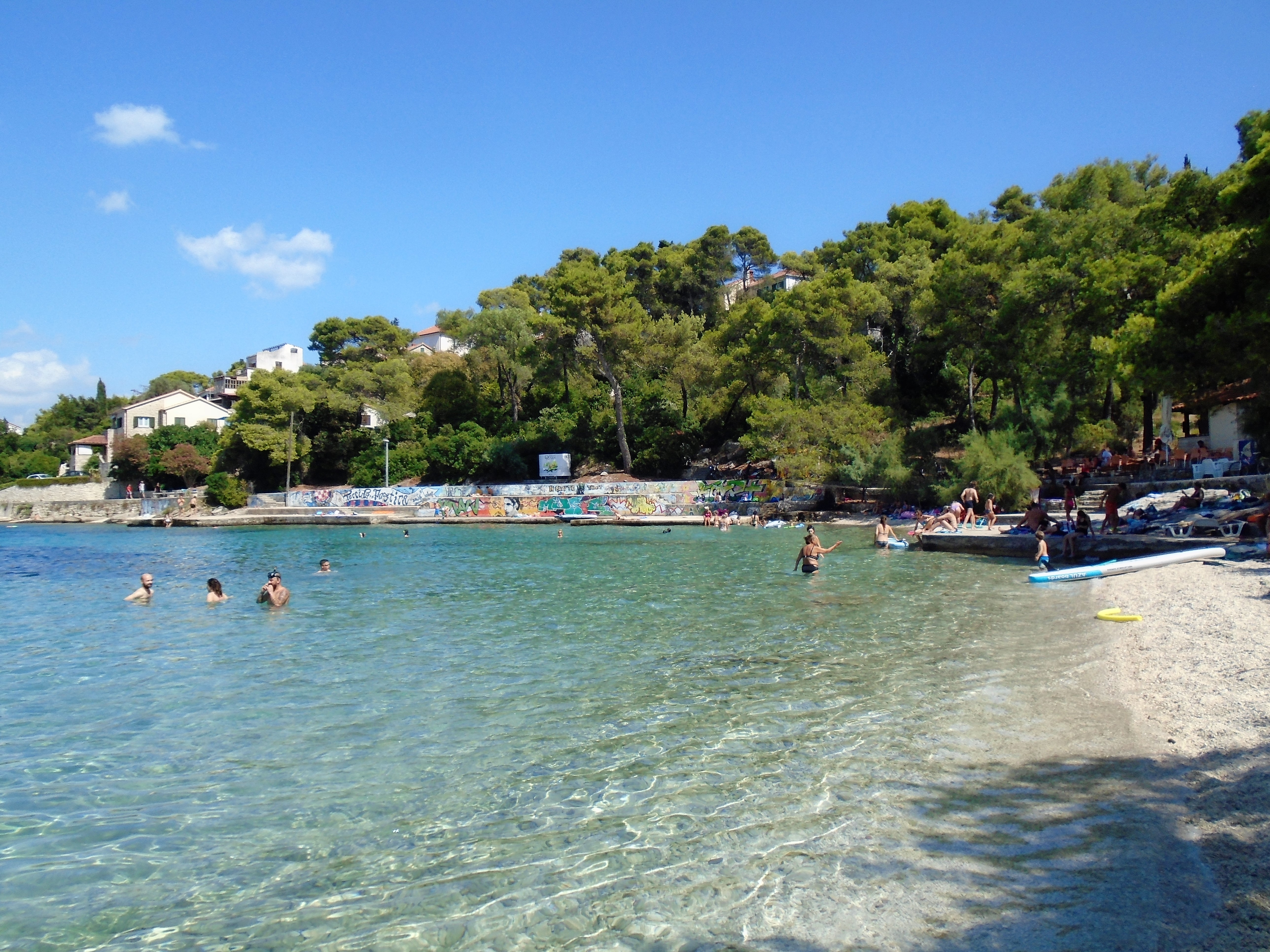
Prvlja beach in Postira

Home products are olive oil and local wine. Sardina d.d. company can fish producer from the high quality Adriatic pilchard Sardina pilchardus.

Next to the harbour are the beaches of Prvlja and Zastivanje. Beach Mala Lozna is on the east end of Postira village and far more to the east, is the very attractive sand beach, Lovrečina. Near Lovrečina beach are the ruins of a large early Christian basilica from the 5th-6th century.

There are hotels Pastura, Vrilo and Lipa in the village and many private apartments. Near the port is supermarket Studenac, bakery, bank, post and market. There are also several restaurants and tourist information center.

== Culture ==
In the center of the village is the Church of John the Baptist (Sv. Ivan Krstitelj).

== Sport ==
N.K. Postira ex Kolektivac is local football club.

== Notable persons ==
(in chronological order)

- Ivan Matija Škarić dr.theology, Croatian translated interpretation of the Holy Bible (1793–1871)
- Vladimir Nazor (1876–1949), poet and writer, who was born in Postira
- Ruggero Tommaseo, writer and journalist, killed by communists 18.9.1943.
- Josip Škarić (1889–1975), physician, founder of the Higijenski zavod the first bacteriology station in Balkan region
