= Studenac =

Studenac may refer to:

- Studenac, Serbia, a village in southern Serbia
- Studenac, a peak of the Volujak, a mountain on the border of Bosnia and Montenegro
- Studenac Market, a Croatian grocery store chain
- ŽKK Studenac Omiš, a Croatian basketball club
