= Presentation of Jesus =

Early episode in the life of Jesus

Presentation at the Temple by Ambrogio Lorenzetti, 1342 (Galleria degli Uffizi, Florence)

The Presentation of Jesus is an early episode in the life of Jesus Christ, describing his presentation at the Temple in Jerusalem. It is celebrated by many churches on February 2nd, 40 days after Christmas, on Candlemas or the Feast of the Presentation of Christ in the temple. The episode is described in chapter 2 of the Gospel of Luke. Within the account, "Luke's narration of the Presentation in the Temple combines the purification rite with the Jewish ceremony of the redemption of the firstborn (Luke 2, Luke 2:23–24)."

In the Eastern Orthodox Church, the Presentation of Jesus at the temple is celebrated as one of the twelve Great Feasts, and is sometimes called Hypapante (Ὑπαπαντή, "meeting" in Greek).

The Orthodox Churches which use the Julian Calendar celebrate it on 15 February, and the Armenian Church on 14 February.

In Western Christianity, the Feast of the Presentation of the Lord is also known by its earlier name as the Feast of the Purification of the Virgin or the Meeting of the Lord. In some liturgical calendars, Vespers (or Compline) on the Feast of the Presentation marks the end of the Epiphany season, also (since the 2018 lectionary) in the Evangelische Kirche in Deutschland (EKD). In the Catholic Church, especially since the time of Pope Gelasius I (492–496) who in the fifth century contributed to its expansion, the Feast of the Presentation is celebrated on 2 February. In the Church of England, the mother church of the Anglican Communion, the Presentation of Christ in the Temple is a Principal Feast celebrated either on 2 February or on the Sunday between 28 January and 3 February.

In the Roman Rite of the Catholic Church, the Anglican Communion, and the Lutheran Church, the episode was also reflected in the once-prevalent custom of churching of women forty days after the birth of a child. The Feast of the Presesentation of the Lord is in the Roman Rite also attached to the World Day of Consecrated Life.

== Scripture ==
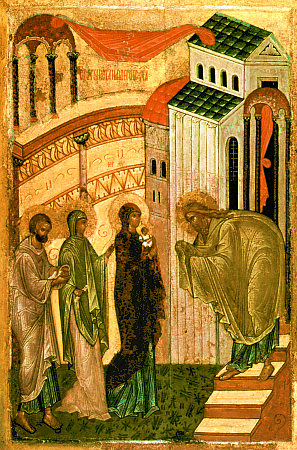
Meeting of the Lord, Russian Orthodox icon, 15th century

The event is described in the Gospel of Luke (Luke 2:22–40). According to the gospel, Mary and Joseph took the Infant Jesus to the Temple in Jerusalem forty days (inclusive) after his birth to complete Mary's ritual purification after childbirth, and to perform the redemption of the firstborn son, in obedience to the Torah (Leviticus 12, Exodus 13:12–15, etc.). Luke explicitly says that Joseph and Mary take the option provided for poor people (those who could not afford a lamb; Leviticus 12:8), sacrificing "a pair of turtledoves, or two young pigeons." Leviticus 12:1–4 indicates that this event should take place forty days after birth for a male child, hence the Presentation is celebrated forty days after Christmas.

Upon bringing Jesus into the temple, they encountered Simeon. The Gospel records that Simeon had been promised that "he should not see death before he had seen the Lord's Christ" (Luke 2:26). Simeon then uttered the prayer that would become known as the Nunc Dimittis, or Canticle of Simeon, which prophesied the redemption of the world by Jesus:

"Lord, now let your servant depart in peace, according to your word; for my eyes have seen your salvation which you have prepared in the presence of all peoples, a light for revelation to the Gentiles, and for glory to your people Israel". (Luke 2:29–32).

Simeon then prophesied to Mary: "Behold, this child is set for the fall and rising of many in Israel, and for a sign that is spoken against (and a sword will pierce through your own soul also), that thoughts out of many hearts may be revealed. (Luke 2:34–35).

The elderly prophetess Anna was also in the Temple, and offered prayers and praise to God for Jesus, and spoke to everyone there of his importance to redemption in Jerusalem (Luke 2:36–38).

Cornelius a Lapide comments on Mary and Joseph sacrificing a pair of turtledoves: "...because they were poor; for the rich were obliged to give in addition to this a sacrificial lamb. Although the three kings had offered to Christ a great quantity of gold, still the Blessed Virgin, zealously affected towards poverty, accepted but little of it, that she might show her contempt of all earthly things...." The couple offered two turtledoves or two pigeons (Luke 2:24) presumably because they could not afford a lamb.

== Liturgical celebration ==
The Presentation of Jesus at the Temple
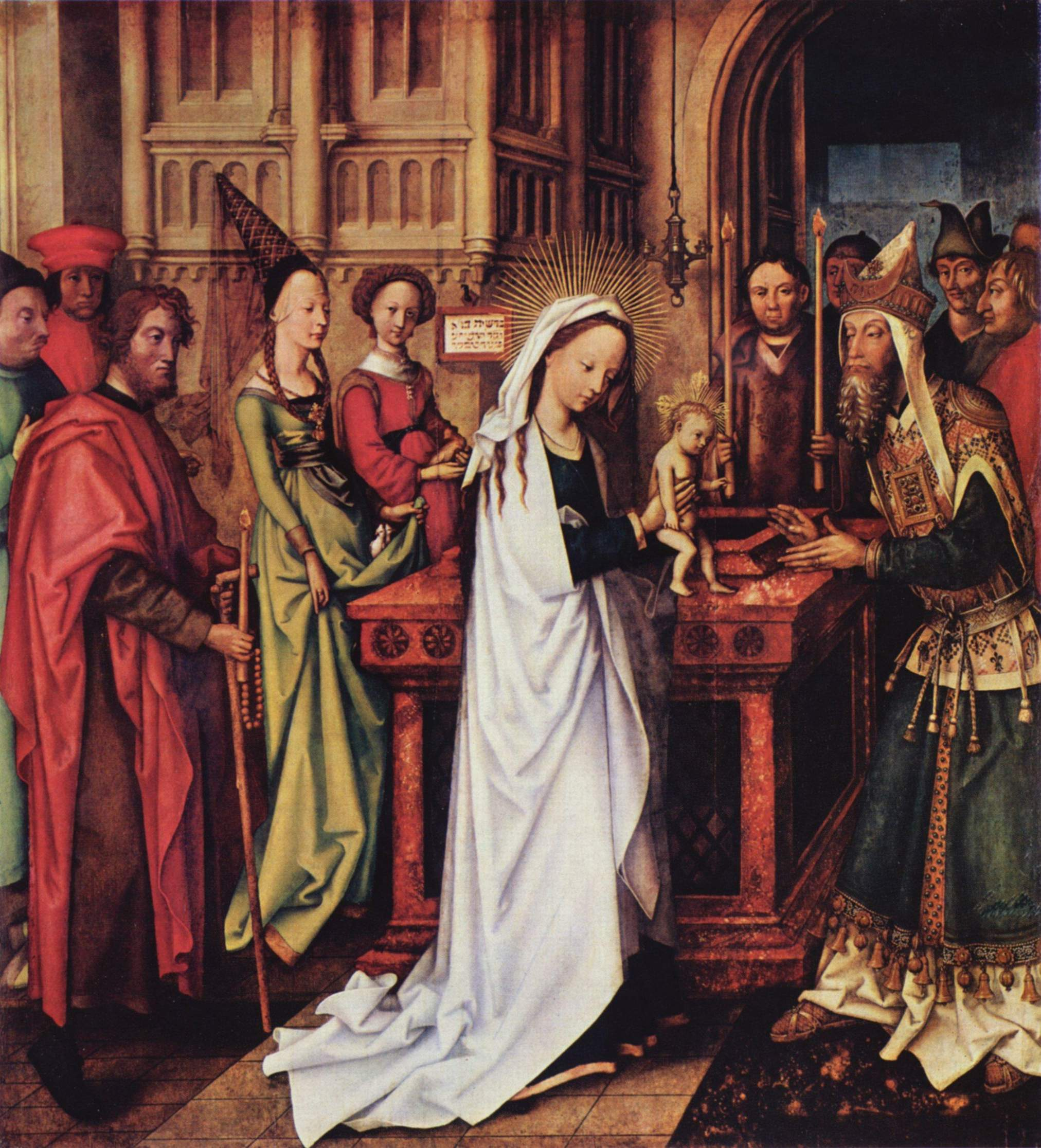
- Presentation of Christ at the Temple by Hans Holbein the Elder, 1500–01 (Kunsthalle Hamburg)
- Observed by: Roman Catholics; Anglicans; Eastern Orthodox; Lutherans; Oriental Orthodox; Methodists
- Type: Christian
- Date: 2 February (Gregorian); 14 February (Armenian Apostolic Church)

=== Name of the celebration ===
In addition to being known as the Feast of the Presentation of Jesus at the Temple, other traditional names include Candlemas, the Feast of the Purification of the Virgin, and the Meeting of the Lord. Candlemas is an English name for the feast because of the procession with lighted candles at the Mass on this day, reflecting Simeon's proclamation of "a light for revelation to the Gentiles", which, in turn, echoes Isaiah 49:6 in the second of the "servant of the Lord" oracles.

The date of Candlemas is established by the date set for the Nativity of Jesus, for it comes forty days afterwards. Under Mosaic law as found in the Torah, a mother who had given birth to a boy was considered unclean for seven days; moreover she was to remain for three and thirty days "in the blood of her purification." Candlemas therefore corresponds to the day on which Mary, according to Jewish law, should have attended a ceremony of ritual purification (Leviticus 12:2–8). The Gospel of Luke 2:22–39 relates that Mary was purified according to the religious law, followed by Jesus' presentation in the Jerusalem temple, and this explains the formal names given to the festival, as well as its falling 40 days after the Nativity.

In the Roman Catholic Church, it is known as the Presentation of the Lord in the liturgical books first issued by Paul VI, and as the Purification of the Blessed Virgin Mary in earlier editions. In the Eastern Orthodox Church and Greek Catholic Churches (Eastern Catholic Churches which use the Byzantine rite), it is known as the Feast of the Presentation of our Lord, God, and Savior Jesus Christ in the Temple or as The Meeting of Our Lord, God and Saviour Jesus Christ.

It is known as the Presentation of Our Lord in the Evangelical Lutheran Church in America. The Lutheran Church–Missouri Synod observes 2 February as The Purification of Mary and the Presentation of Our Lord.

In the churches of the Anglican Communion, it is known by various names, including The Presentation of Our Lord Jesus Christ in The Temple (Candlemas) (Episcopal Church), The Presentation of Christ in the Temple, and The Purification of the Blessed Virgin Mary (Anglican Church of Canada), The Presentation of Christ in the Temple (Candlemas) (Church of England), and The Presentation of Christ in the Temple (Anglican Church of Australia).

=== Practices ===
Traditionally, Candlemas had been the last feast day in the Christian year that was dated by reference to Christmas. It is another "epiphany" type feast as Jesus is revealed as the messiah by the canticle of Simeon and the prophetess Anna. It also fits into this theme, as the earliest manifestation of Jesus inside the house of his heavenly Father. Subsequent moveable feasts are calculated with reference to Easter.

==== Western Christianity ====
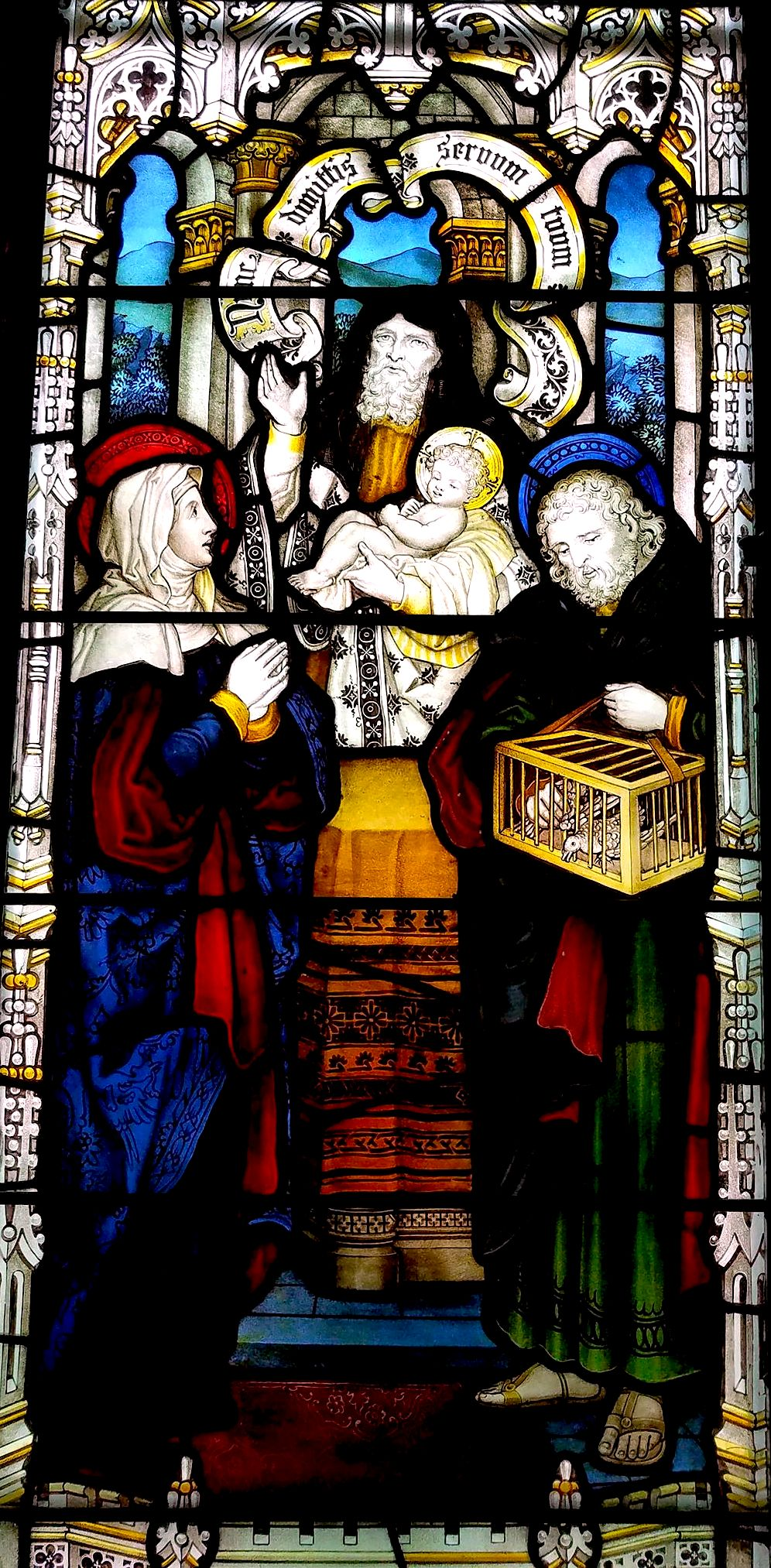
Presentation of Jesus, c. 1896, Church of the Good Shepherd (Rosemont, Pennsylvania)

Candlemas occurs 40 days after Christmas.

Traditionally, the Western term "Candlemas" (or Candle Mass) referred to the practice whereby a priest on 2 February blessed beeswax candles for use throughout the year, some of which were distributed to the faithful for use in the home. In Poland the feast is called Święto Matki Bożej Gromnicznej (Feast of Our Lady of Thunder candles). This name refers to the candles that are blessed on this day, called gromnice, since these candles are lit during (thunder) storms and placed in windows to ward off storms.

This feast has been referred to as the Feast of Presentation of the Lord within the Roman Catholic Church since the liturgical revisions of the Second Vatican Council, with references to candles and the purification of Mary de-emphasised in favor of the Prophecy of Simeon the Righteous. Pope John Paul II connected the feast day with the renewal of religious vows. In the Roman Catholic Church, the Presentation of Jesus in the Temple is the fourth Joyful Mystery of the Rosary.

In the Liturgy of the Hours, the Marian antiphon Alma Redemptoris Mater is used from Advent through 2 February, after which Ave Regina Caelorum is used through Good Friday.

==== Eastern Christianity ====
In the Byzantine tradition practised by the Eastern Orthodox, the Meeting of the Lord is unique among the Great Feasts in that it combines elements of both a Great Feast of the Lord and a Great Feast of the Theotokos (Mother of God). It has a forefeast of one day, and an afterfeast of seven days. However, if the feast falls during Cheesefare Week or Great Lent, the afterfeast is either shortened or eliminated altogether.

The holiday is celebrated with an all-night vigil on the eve of the feast, and a celebration of the Divine Liturgy the next morning, at which beeswax candles are blessed. This blessing traditionally takes place after the Little Hours and before the beginning of the Divine Liturgy (though in some places it is done after). The priest reads four prayers, and then a fifth one during which all present bow their heads before God. He then censes the candles and blesses them with holy water. The candles are then distributed to the people and the Liturgy begins.

It is because of the biblical events recounted in the second chapter of Luke that the Churching of Women came to be practised in both Eastern and Western Christianity. The usage has mostly died out in the West, except among Western Rite Orthodoxy, very occasionally still among Anglicans, and Traditionalist Catholics, but the ritual is still practised in the Orthodox Church. In addition, babies, both boys and girls are taken to the Church on the fortieth day after their birth in remembrance of the Theotokos and Joseph taking the infant Jesus to the Temple.

Some Christians observe the practice of leaving Christmas decorations up until Candlemas.

=== Date ===
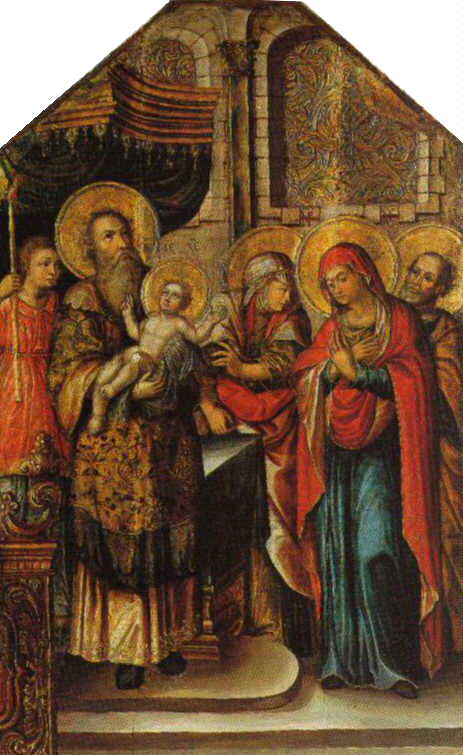
Meeting of the Lord, Orthodox icon from Belarus (1731)

In the Eastern and Western liturgical calendars the Presentation of the Lord falls on 2 February, forty days (inclusive) after Christmas. In the Church of England it may be celebrated on this day, or on the Sunday between 28 January and 3 February. This feast never falls in Lent; the earliest that Ash Wednesday can fall is 4 February, for the case of Easter on 22 March in a non-leap year. However, in the Tridentine rite, it can fall in the pre-Lenten season if Easter is early enough, and "Alleluia" has to be omitted from this feast's liturgy when that happens.

In Swedish and Finnish Lutheran Churches, Candlemas is (since 1774) always celebrated on a Sunday, at earliest on 2 February and at latest on 8 February, except if this Sunday happens to be the last Sunday before Lent, i.e. Shrove Sunday or Quinquagesima (Swedish: Fastlagssöndagen, Finnish: Laskiaissunnuntai), in which case Candlemas is celebrated one week earlier.

In the Armenian Apostolic Church, the Feast, called "The Coming of the Son of God into the Temple" (Tiarn'ndaraj, from Tyarn-, "the Lord", and -undarach "going forward"), is celebrated on 14 February. The Armenians do not celebrate the Nativity on 25 December, but on 6 January, and thus their date of the feast is 40 days after that: 14 February. The night before the feast, Armenians traditionally light candles during an evening church service, carrying the flame out into the darkness (symbolically bringing light into the void) and either take it home to light lamps or light a bonfire in the church courtyard.

== History ==
The Feast of the Presentation is among the most ancient feasts of the Church. Celebration of the feast dates from the fourth century in Jerusalem. There are sermons on the Feast by the bishops Methodius of Patara († 312), Cyril of Jerusalem († 360), Gregory the Theologian († 389), Amphilochius of Iconium († 394), Gregory of Nyssa († 400), and John Chrysostom († 407).

The earliest reference to specific liturgical rites surrounding the feast are by the intrepid Egeria, during her pilgrimage to the Holy Land (381–384). She reported that 14 February was a day solemnly kept in Jerusalem with a procession to Constantine I's Basilica of the Resurrection, with a homily preached on Luke 2:22 (which makes the occasion perfectly clear), and a Divine Liturgy. This so-called Itinerarium Peregrinatio ("Pilgrimage Itinerary") of Egeria does not, however, offer a specific name for the Feast. The date of 14 February indicates that in Jerusalem at that time, Christ's birth was celebrated on 6 January, Epiphany. Egeria writes for her beloved fellow nuns at home:

XXVI. "The fortieth day after the Epiphany is undoubtedly celebrated here with the very highest honor, for on that day there is a procession, in which all take part, in the Anastasis, and all things are done in their order with the greatest joy, just as at Easter. All the priests, and after them the bishop, preach, always taking for their subject that part of the Gospel where Joseph and Mary brought the Lord into the Temple on the fortieth day, and Symeon and Anna the prophetess, the daughter of Phanuel, saw him, treating of the words which they spake when they saw the Lord, and of that offering which his parents made. And when everything that is customary has been done in order, the sacrament is celebrated, and the dismissal takes place."

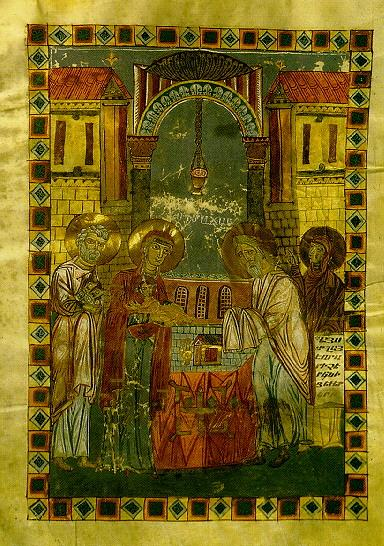
An Armenian miniature illustrating the subject (Mugni Gospels, c. 1060)

About AD 450 in Jerusalem, people began the custom of holding lighted candles during the Divine Liturgy of this feast day. Originally, the feast was a minor celebration. But then in 541, a terrible plague broke out in Constantinople, killing thousands. The Emperor Justinian I, in consultation with the Patriarch of Constantinople, ordered a period of fasting and prayer throughout the entire Empire. And, on the Feast of the Meeting of the Lord, arranged great processions throughout the towns and villages and a solemn prayer service (Litia) to ask for deliverance from evils, and the plague ceased. In thanksgiving, in 542 the feast was elevated to a more solemn celebration and established throughout the Eastern Empire by the Emperor.

In Rome, the feast appears in the Gelasian Sacramentary, a manuscript collection of the seventh and eighth centuries associated with Pope Gelasius I. There it carries for the first time the new title of the feast of Purification of the Blessed Virgin Mary. Late in time though it may be, Candlemas is still the most ancient of all the festivals in honor of the Virgin Mary. The date of the feast in Rome was 2 February because the Roman date for Christ's nativity had been 25 December since at least the early fourth century.

Though modern laymen picture Candlemas as an important feast throughout the Middle Ages in Europe, in fact it spread slowly in the West; it is not found in the Lectionary of Silos (650) nor in the Calendar (731–741) of Sainte-Geneviève of Paris.

The tenth-century Benedictional of St. Æthelwold, bishop of Winchester, has a formula used for blessing the candles. Candlemas did become important enough to find its way into the secular calendar. It was the traditional day to remove the cattle from the hay meadows, and from the field that was to be ploughed and sown that spring. References to it are common in later medieval and early Modern literature; Shakespeare's Twelfth Night is recorded as having its first performance on Candlemas Day 1602. It remains one of the Scottish quarter days, at which debts are paid and law courts are in session.

=== Relation to other celebrations ===
The Feast of the Presentation depends on the date for Christmas: As per the passage from the Gospel of Luke (Luke 2:22–40) describing the event in the life of Jesus, the celebration of the Presentation of the Lord follows 40 days after. The blessing of candles on this day recalls Simeon's reference to the infant Jesus as the "light for revelation to the Gentiles" (Luke 2:32).

Modern Pagans believe that Candlemas is a Christianization of the Gaelic festival of Imbolc, which was celebrated in pre-Christian Europe (and especially the Celtic Nations) at about the same time of year. Imbolc is called "St. Brigid's Day" or "Brigid" in Ireland. Both the goddess Brigid and the Christian Saint Brigid—who was the Abbess of Kildare—are associated with sacred flames, holy wells and springs, healing, and smithcraft. Brigid is a virgin, yet also the patron of midwives. However, a connection with Roman (rather than Celtic or Germanic) polytheism is more plausible, since the feast was celebrated before any serious attempt to expand Christianity into non-Roman countries.

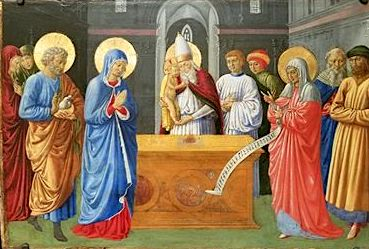
Presentation of Christ in the Temple, Benozzo Gozzoli, 1460–1461 (Philadelphia Museum of Art)

In Irish homes, there were many rituals revolving around welcoming Brigid into the home. Some of Brigid's rituals and legends later became attached to Saint Brigid, who was seen by Celtic Christians as the midwife of Christ and "Mary of the Gael". In Ireland and Scotland she is the "foster mother of Jesus." The exact date of the Imbolc festival may have varied from place to place based on local tradition and regional climate. Imbolc is celebrated by modern Pagans on the eve of 2 February, at the astronomical midpoint, or on the full moon closest to the first spring thaw.

Frederick Holweck, writing in the Catholic Encyclopædia says definite in its rejection of this argument: "The feast was certainly not introduced by Pope Gelasius to suppress the excesses of the Lupercalia," (referencing J.P. Migne, Missale Gothicum, 691) The 1911 Encyclopædia Britannica agrees: the association with Gelasius "has led some to suppose that it was ordained by Pope Gelasius I in 492 as a counter-attraction to the pagan Lupercalia; but for this there is no warrant." Since the two festivals are both concerned with the ritual purification of women, not all historians are convinced that the connection is purely coincidental. Gelasius certainly did write a treatise against Lupercalia, and this still exists.

Pope Innocent XII believed Candlemas was created as an alternative to Roman Paganism, as stated in a sermon on the subject:

Why do we in this feast carry candles? Because the Gentiles dedicated the month of February to the infernal gods, and as at the beginning of it Pluto stole Proserpine, and her mother Ceres sought her in the night with lighted candles, so they, at the beginning of the month, walked about the city with lighted candles. Because the holy fathers could not extirpate the custom, they ordained that Christians should carry about candles in honor of the Blessed Virgin; and thus what was done before in the honor of Ceres is now done in honor of the Blessed Virgin.

There is no contemporary evidence to support the popular notions that Gelasius abolished the Lupercalia, or that he, or any other prelate, replaced it with the Feast of the Purification of the Blessed Virgin Mary.

In Armenia, celebrations at the Presentation have been influenced by pre-Christian customs, such as: the spreading of ashes by farmers in their fields each year to ensure a better harvest, keeping ashes on the roof of a house to keep evil spirits away, and the belief that newlywed women needed to jump over fire to purify themselves before getting pregnant. Young men will also leap over a bonfire.

The tradition of lighting a candle in each window is not the origin of the name "Candlemas", which instead refers to a blessing of candles.

On the day following Candlemas, the feast of St. Blaise is celebrated. It is connected to the rite of Blessing of the Throats, which is, for to be available to reach more people, also often transferred after the Mass of the Presentation of the Lord or even bestowed on both feasts. By coincidence, the Blessing of the Throats is bestowed with crossed candles.

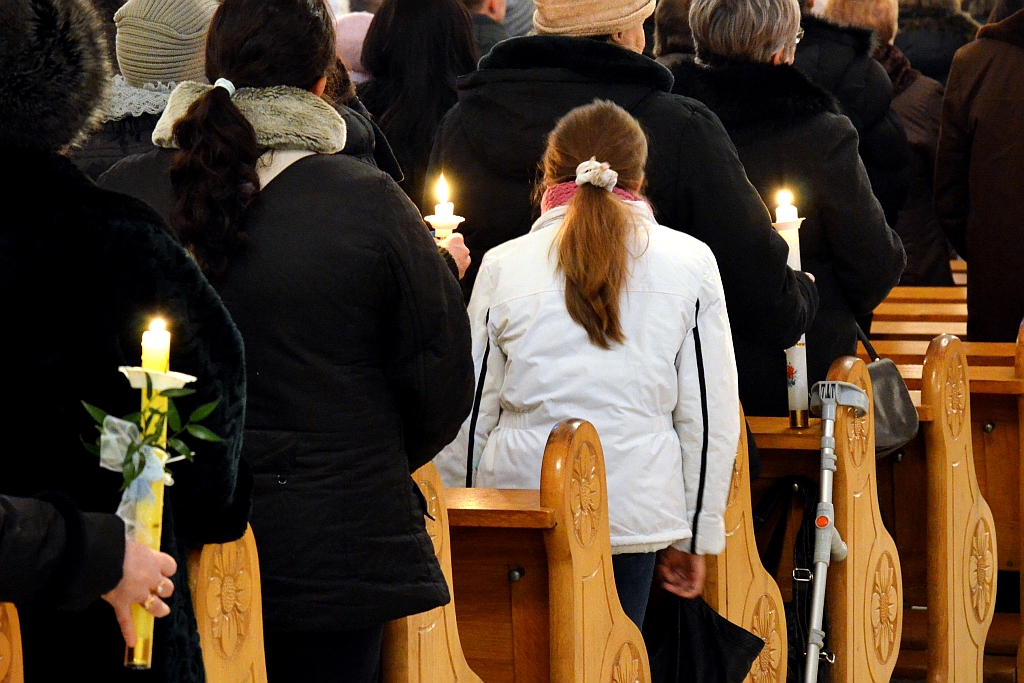
Candles on Candlemas Day, Sanok 2013

== In art ==
The event forms a usual component of extensive cycles of the Life of Christ and also of the Life of the Virgin. Often either the Presentation of Jesus or the visually similar Circumcision of Jesus was shown, but by the late Middle Ages the two were sometimes combined. Early images concentrated on the moment of meeting with Simeon.

In the West, beginning in the 8th or 9th century, a different depiction at an altar emerged, where Simeon eventually by the Late Middle Ages came to be shown wearing the elaborate vestments attributed to the Jewish High Priest, and conducting a liturgical ceremony surrounded by the family and Anna. In the West, Simeon is more often already holding the infant, or the moment of handover is shown; in Eastern images the Virgin is more likely still to hold Jesus. In the Eastern Churches this event is called the Hypapante.

Simeon's comment that "you yourself a sword will pierce" gave rise to a subset iconography of the Sorrowful Mother.

=== Gallery ===
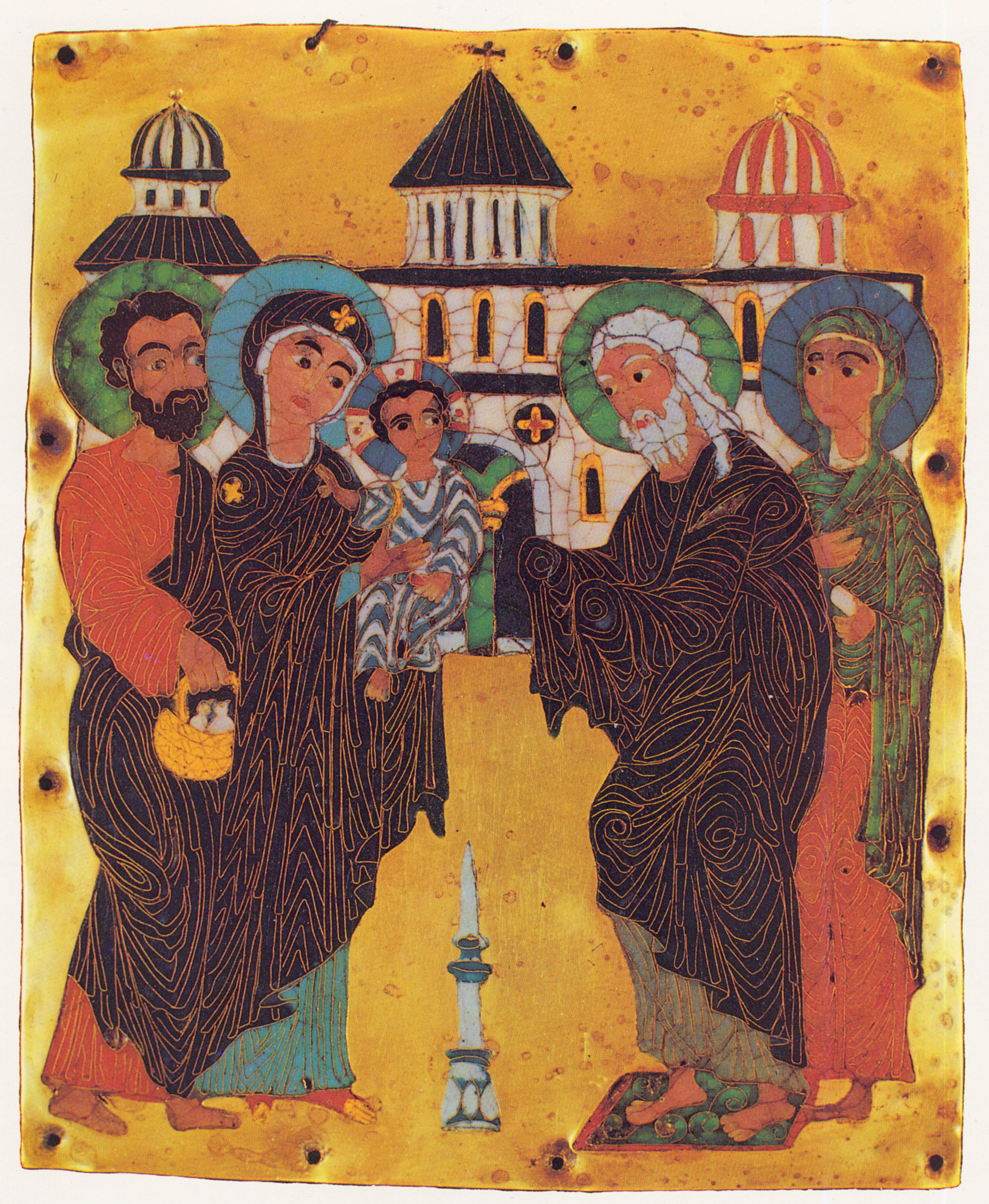
Presentation of Jesus at the Temple, 12th-century cloisonné enamel icon from Georgia

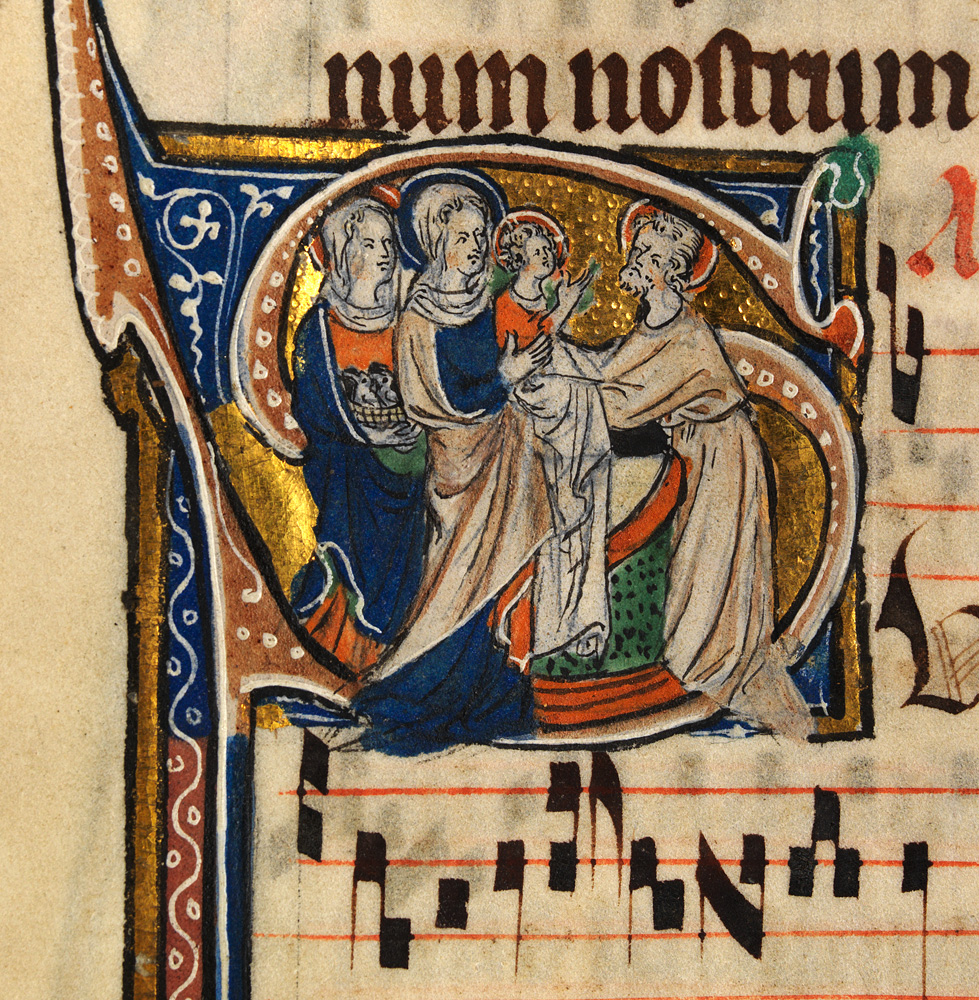
Presentation of Christ in the Temple, from the Sherbrooke Missal

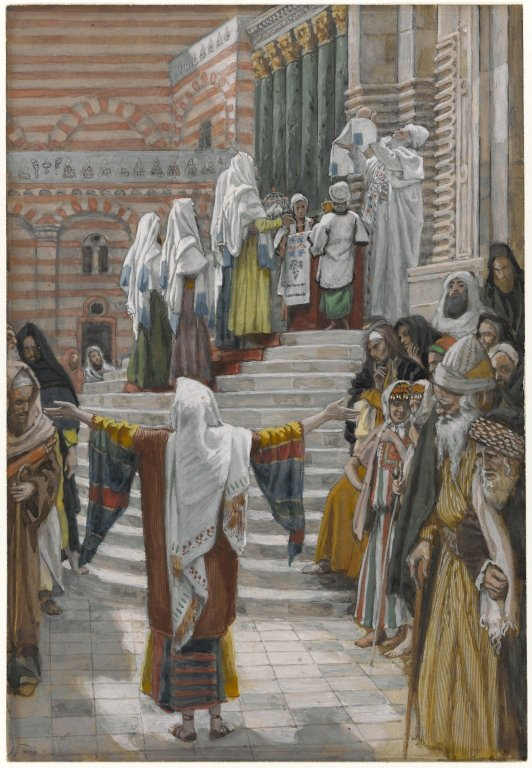
James Tissot, The Presentation of Jesus in the Temple (La présentation de Jésus au Temple), Brooklyn Museum

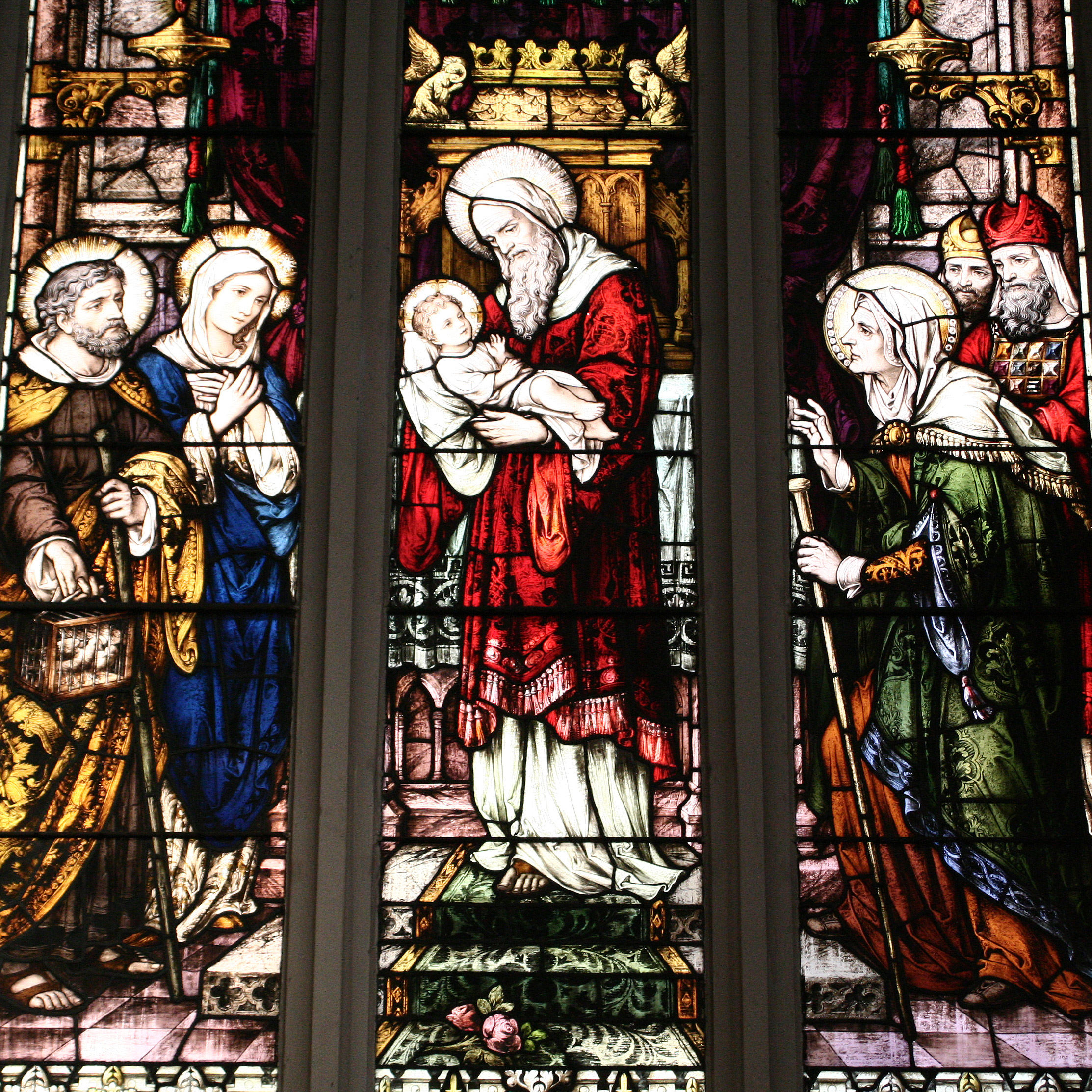
Stained glass window at St. Michael's Cathedral (Toronto) depicts Infant Jesus at the Temple

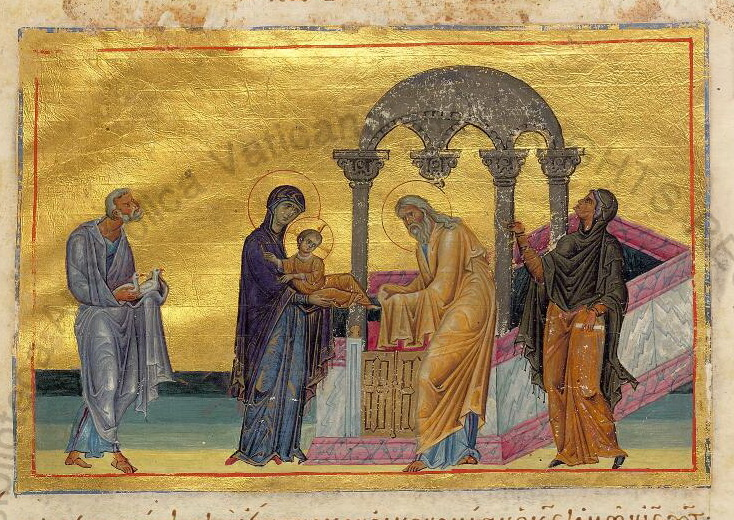
Painting from the Menologion of Basil II (c. 1000 AD)

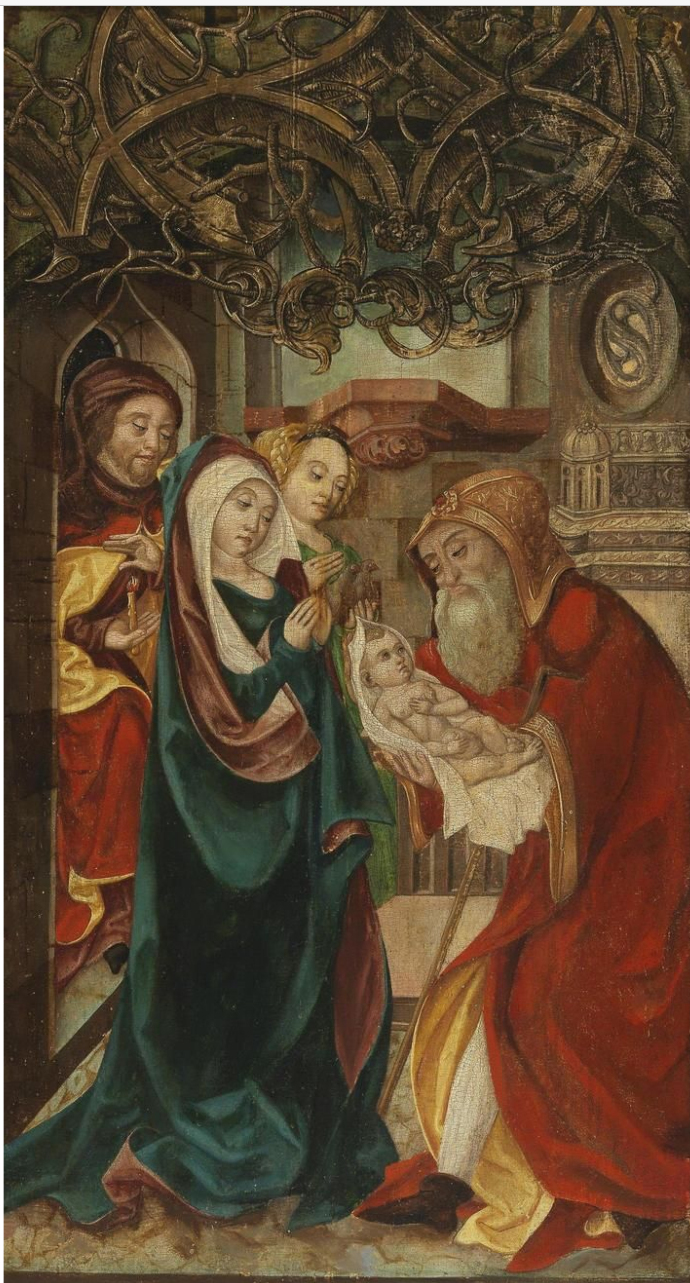
Presentation of Christ in the Temple, South German, likely altarpiece wing, late 15th century. (Private collection)

== In music ==
Many motets and anthems have been composed to celebrate this feast and are performed as part of the liturgy, among them an anthem by 16th century German composer Johannes Eccard (1553–1611), Maria wallt zum Heiligtum, often translated in English as "When Mary to the Temple went".

The Lutheran church of the Baroque observed the feast as Mariae Reinigung (Purification of Mary). Johann Sebastian Bach composed several cantatas to be performed in the church service of the day, related to Simeon's canticle Nunc dimittis as part of the prescribed readings.

- Erfreute Zeit im neuen Bunde, BWV 83, 1724
- Mit Fried und Freud ich fahr dahin, BWV 125, 1725 (on Luther's hymn after Nunc dimittis)
- Ich habe genug, BWV 82, 1727

== Traditions and superstitions ==
"Down with the rosemary, and so
Down with the bays and mistletoe;
Down with the holly, ivy, all,
Wherewith ye dress'd the Christmas Hall"

— Robert Herrick (1591–1674), "Ceremony upon Candlemas Eve"

As the poem by Robert Herrick records, the eve of Candlemas was the day on which Christmas decorations of greenery were removed from people's homes; for traces of berries, holly and so forth will bring death among the congregation before another year is out.

In Scotland, until a change in the law in 1991 (see Scottish term days), and in much of northern England until the 18th century, Candlemas was one of the traditional quarter days when quarterly rents were due for payment, as well as the day or term for various other business transactions, including the hiring of servants.

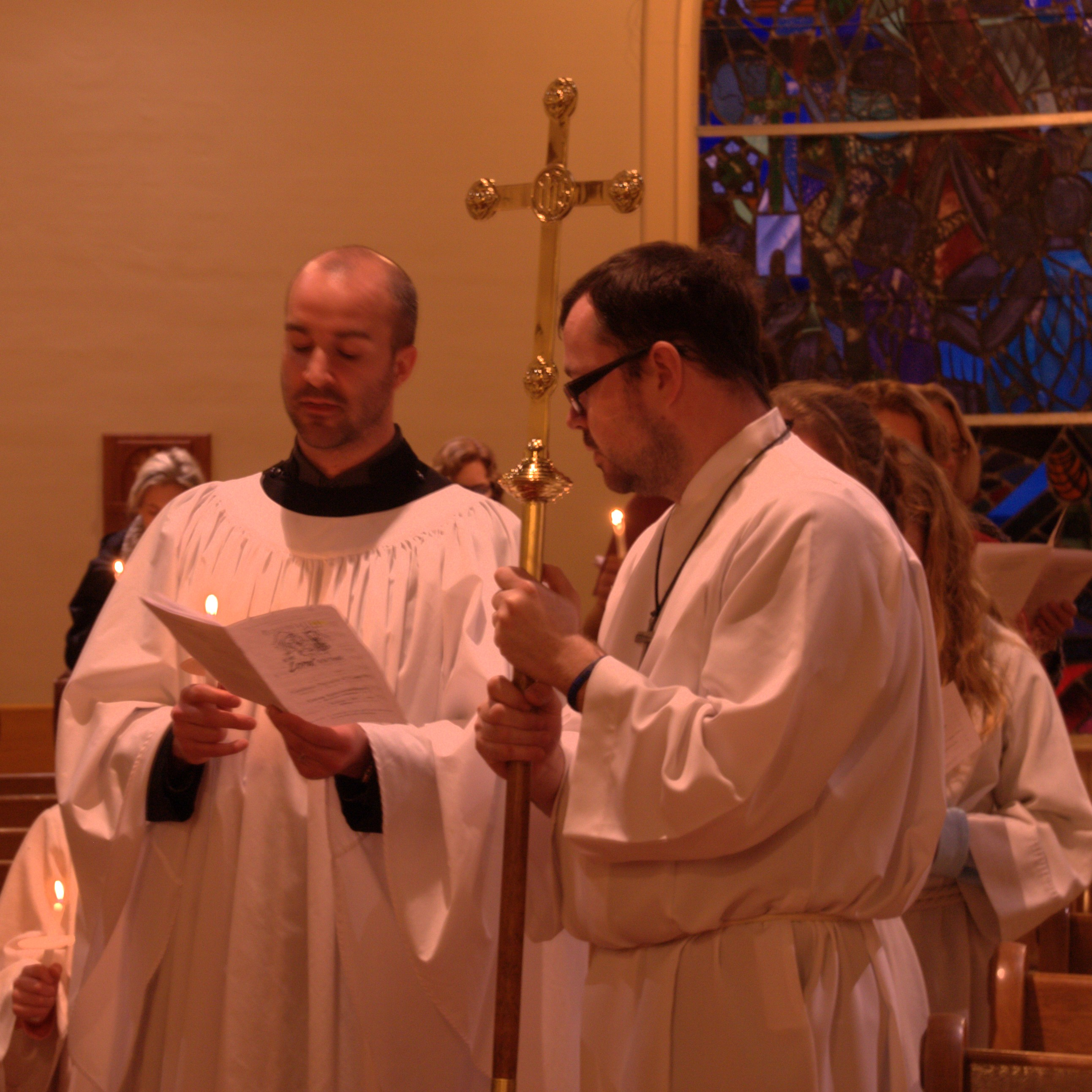
Blessing of the Candles at Candlemas at Calvary Episcopal Church (Rochester, Minnesota)

In the United Kingdom, good weather at Candlemas is taken to indicate severe winter weather later: "If Candlemas Day is clear and bright, / winter will have another bite. / If Candlemas Day brings cloud and rain, / winter is gone and will not come again."

The Carmina Gadelica, a seminal collection of Scottish folklore, refers to a serpent coming out of the mound on Latha Fheill Bride, as the Scots call Candlemas. This rhyme is still used in the West Highlands and Hebrides.

Moch maduinn Bhride, Thig an nimhir as an toll; Cha bhoin mise ris an nimhir, Cha bhoin an nimhir rium.

(Early on Bride's morn, the serpent will come from the hollow I will not molest the serpent, nor will the serpent molest me)

Thig an nathair as an toll, la donn Bride Ged robh tri traighean dh' an t-sneachd air leachd an lair.

(The serpent will come from the hollow on the brown day of Bridget Though there should be three feet of snow on the flat surface of the ground)

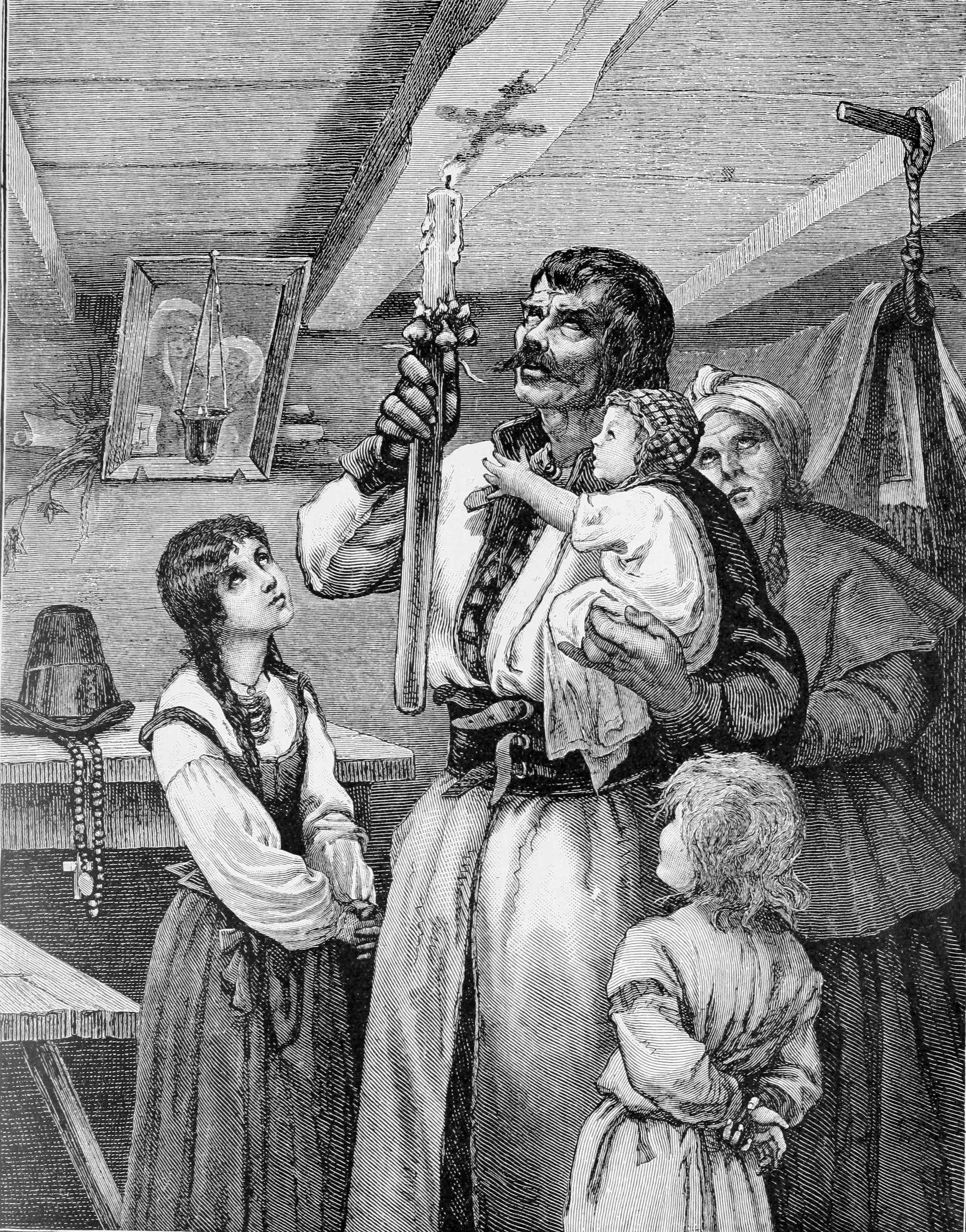
Candlemas Day in the Carpathian region

In the United States, Candlemas coincides with Groundhog Day, the earliest American reference to which can be found at the Pennsylvania Dutch Folklore Center at Franklin and Marshall College. The reference implies that Groundhog Day may have come from a German-American Candlemas tradition:

Last Tuesday, the 2nd, was Candlemas day, the day on which, according to the Germans, the Groundhog peeps out of his winter quarters and if he sees his shadow he pops back for another six weeks nap, but if the day be cloudy he remains out, as the weather is to be moderate.

— 4 February 1841 – from Morgantown, Berks County (Pennsylvania) storekeeper James Morris' diary,

In France and Belgium, Candlemas (French: La Chandeleur) is celebrated with crêpes.

In Italy, traditionally, it (Italian: La Candelora) is considered the last cold day of winter.

In Tenerife (Spain), it is the day of the Virgin of Candelaria (Saint Patron of the Canary Islands). In Catalonia, it is alleged to be the date that bears emerge from hibernation.

In Southern and Central Mexico, and Guatemala City, Candlemas (Spanish: Día de La Candelaria) is celebrated with tamales. Tradition indicates that on 5 January, the night before Three Kings Day (the Epiphany), whoever gets one or more of the few plastic or metal dolls (originally coins) buried within the Rosca de Reyes must pay for the tamales and throw a party on Candlemas. In certain regions of Mexico, this is the day in which the baby Jesus of each household is taken up from the nativity scene and dressed up in various colorful, whimsical outfits.

In Luxembourg, Liichtmëss sees children carrying lighted sticks visiting neighbors and singing a traditional song in exchange for sweets.

Sailors are often reluctant to set sail on Candlemas Day, believing that any voyage begun then will end in disaster—given the frequency of severe storms in February, this is not entirely without sense.

According to over eight centuries of tradition, the swaddling clothes that baby Jesus wore during the presentation at the Temple are kept in Dubrovnik Cathedral, Croatia.

== Consecrations ==
In Croatia, there are several Catholic churches and parishes consecrated to the Presentation of Jesus: in Đurđanci, Beli, Nevest, Dol on Brač and Smokvica.

== See also ==
- "A Song for Simeon", a 1928 poem by T.S. Eliot
- Lupercalia
- Our Lady of Sorrows
- Presentation of Mary
- Category:Paintings of the Presentation of Christ at the Temple

Presentation of Jesus Life of Jesus
| Preceded by Circumcision of Jesus | New Testament; Events | Succeeded by Star of Bethlehem |
