= Kažimir Hraste =

Croatian artist (born 1954)

- Born: 2 February 1954 (age 72); Supetar, SFR Yugoslavia (now Supetar, Croatia)
- Occupations: Sculptor; illustrator; professor

Kažimir Hraste (born 2 February 1954) is a Croatian sculptor, illustrator, and professor.

== Biography ==
Hraste was born on 2 February 1954 in Supetar on the island of Brač. After completing his secondary education at Split's School of Applied Arts, he attended the Academy of Fine Arts at the University of Zagreb under the tutelage of Valerije Michieli, graduating in 1978. In 1984, he began a two-year specialist course in sculpture in Ljubljana and, in 1989, after receiving a scholarship from the Italian government, spent six months in Rome.

Hraste developed a strong reputation for his sculptures, winning many national prizes and awards, including the Order of Danica Hrvatska for his contributions to Croatian culture. He and his artworks have been the subject of two documentaries. He typically utilizes wood, but has been known to use metal and plexiglass.

== Gallery ==
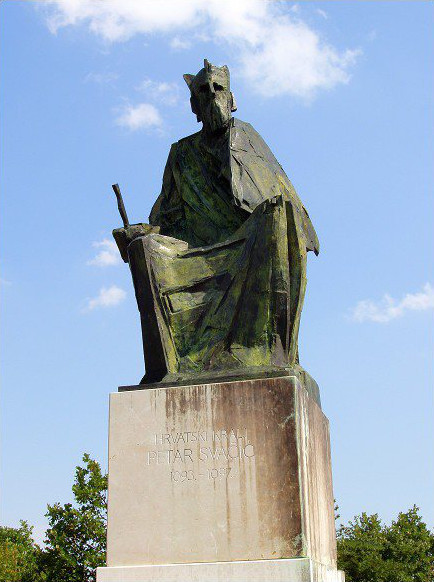
Statue of Petar Svačić

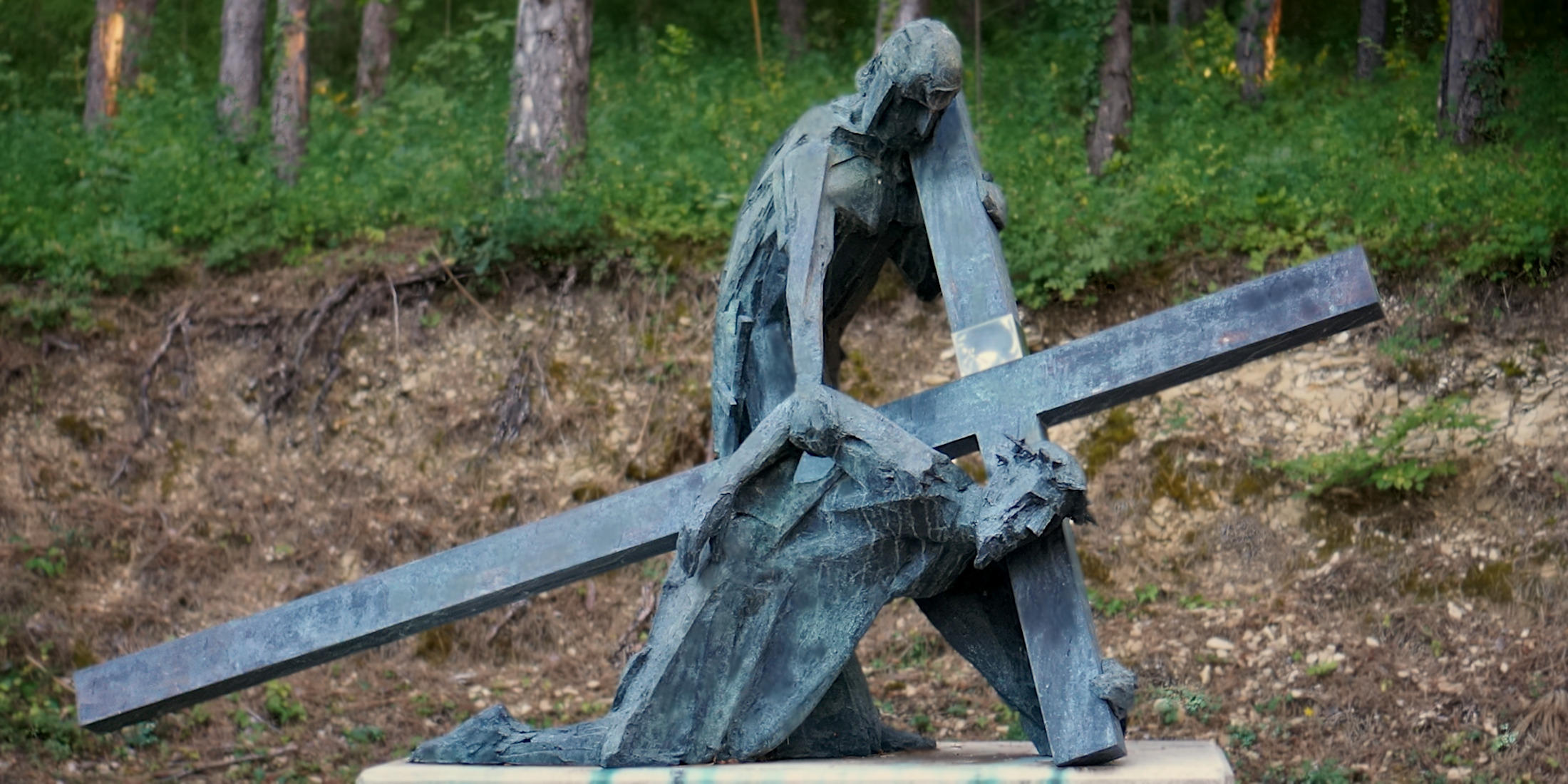
A statue of the Passion of Christ
