= Tonči Matulić =

Croatian Roman Catholic priest (born 1966)

- Born: October 26, 1966; Supetar, SFR Yugoslavia (now Supetar, Croatia)
- Education: University of Zagreb; Alphonsian Academy
- Occupations: Priest, author, professor, bioethicists

Tonči Matulić (born October 26, 1966) is a Croatian Roman Catholic priest, author, university professor, and bioethicist who serves as a dean of Zagreb Catholic Faculty of Theology.

== Early life and education ==
Matulić was born in Supetar on the island of Brač on October 26, 1966, as the tenth child. He attended primary school in Dubrovnik, and high school in Supetar and Split. From 1986 to 1992 he studied theology at the Split and Zagreb Catholic Faculties of Theology. From 1991 to 1992 he studied postgraduate studies at the Zagreb Catholic Faculty of Theology. He earned his master's degree (1995) and doctorate (1998) in moral theology at the Alphonsian Academy in Rome. He continued his studies in the field of bioethics in various institutes in Italy and United States. He is the author of many scientific papers in the field of bioethics.

== Career ==
From 1992 to 1993 Matulić was chaplain and pastor of the island of Hvar, and from 1998 to 1999 teacher of religious studies in primary school in Stari Grad, as well as a parish priest in Selca. Since 1999, Matulić is the professor at the Zagreb Catholic Faculty of Theology at the department of moral theology. Since the academic year 2012/2013 he serves as the Dean of the Faculty. Matulić has published nine books and many other scientific papers. He won the "Croatian Book of the Year" award in 2009 for his book "Metamorphosis of culture-Theological recognition of signes of time in an atmosphere of scientific-technical civilization".

In addition, Matulić is active in media as a theologian and intellectual, as well as commentator of religious, bioethical, social and political questions.
