= Splitska =

Village on Brač, Croatia

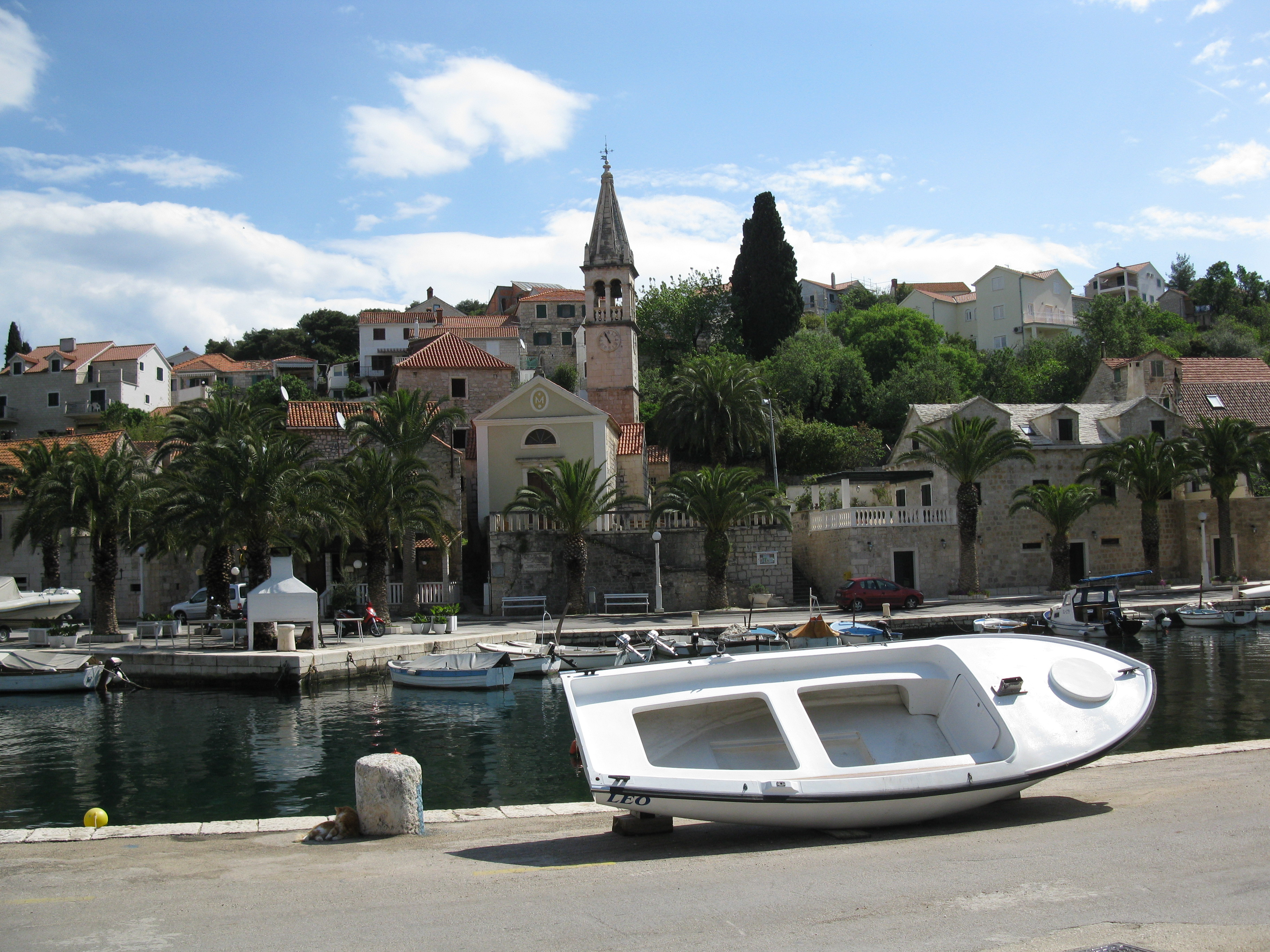

- Location within Croatia
- Coordinates: 43°23′N 16°36′E
- Country: Croatia
- County: Split-Dalmatia
- City: Supetar

Area
  - Total: 8.2 km^{2} (3.2 sq mi)

Population (2021)
  - Total: 352
  - Density: 43/km^{2} (110/sq mi)
- Time zone: UTC+1 (CET)
  - Summer (DST): UTC+2 (CEST)

Splitska is an ancient village on the island of Brač in Croatia. The population is 368 (census 2011).

The village got its name from a derivative of Split (the second largest city in Croatia with over 200,000 inhabitants). The village name was first mentioned in the year 1577 AD, when Mihovil Cerinić (Cerineo) from Škrip built a small castle in the village.

Splitska is approximately six km distant from the main town on Brač called Supetar and 25 km from Brač airport. It is easily accessible by car and it is connected daily with Supetar by bus. In summer there's a possibility of transport by small ship which sails from Split directly to Splitska. The village has numerous amenities for holidays including restaurants, shops, tennis courts, and a post office.

== History ==
The village was settled by Romans to mine stones which were used to construct the Diocletian Palace and many other buildings throughout Europe. The initial quarry is located only a few hundred meters from the main road which passes Splitska.

The first inhabitants in Splitska came from Škrip (a village above Splitska). When they settled in Splitska they built the church of St. Mary (in Croatian: sveta Marija). In the 13th century the village was abandoned because the inhabitants were threatened by pirates from Omiš. This danger ceased in the year 1444, which led the village to be resettled.

In 1577 Mihovil Cerinić, a Dalmatian nobleman from the village of Škrip, erected a citadel in the centre of Splitska. His intent had been to use it as a fortress against the impending waves of Ottoman Turks that swept across Brač in that era. This castle became the village's first true landmark.

== Line notes ==
- C.Michael Hogan, "Diocletian's Palace", The Megalithic Portal, Andy Burnham ed., Oct. 6, 2007
