= Dol, Brač =

Dol
- Village
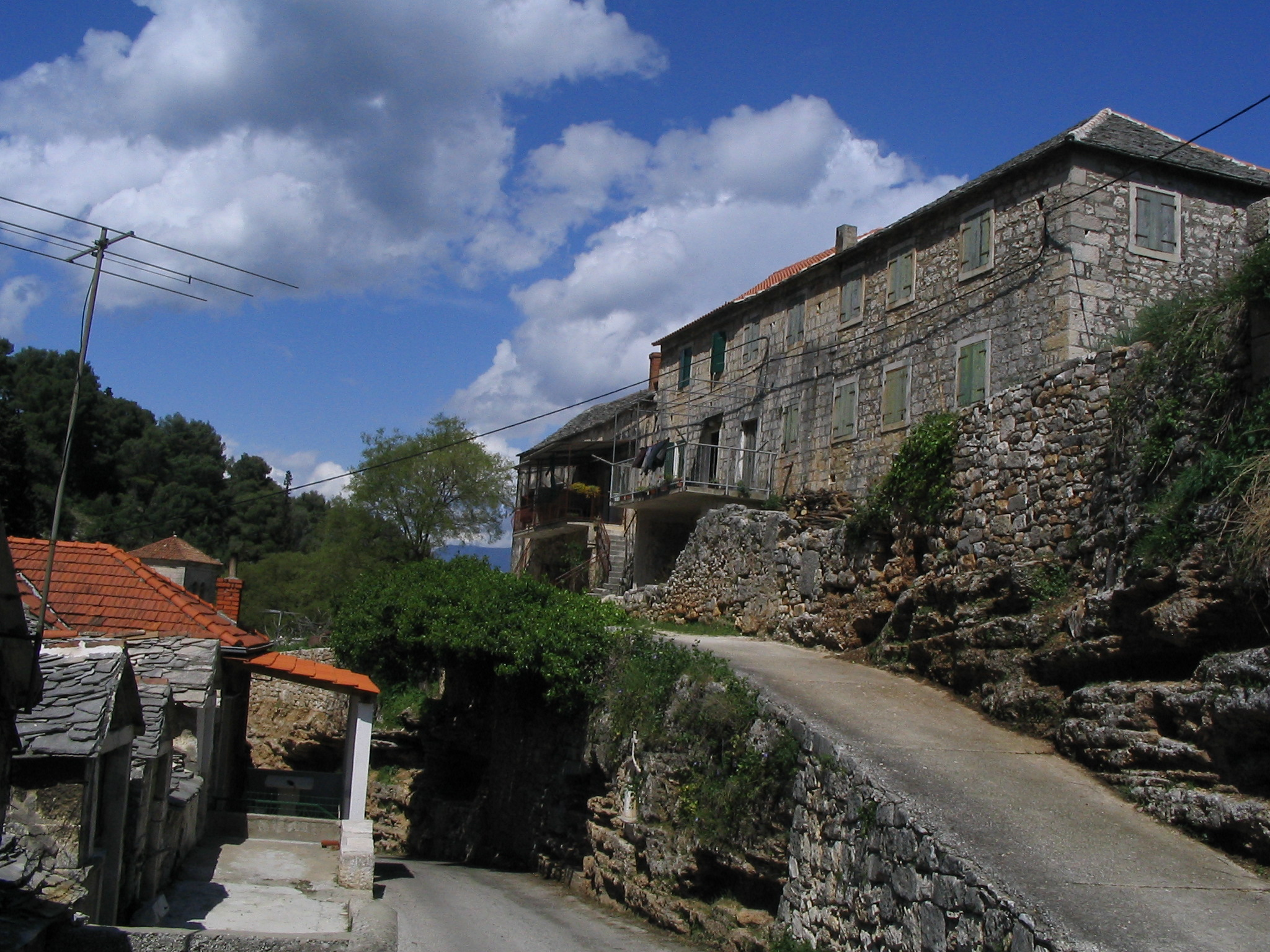

- Location within Croatia
- Country: Croatia
- County: Split-Dalmatia County
- Municipality: Postira

Area
  - Total: 36.8 km^{2} (14.2 sq mi)

Population (2021)
  - Total: 107
  - Density: 2.91/km^{2} (7.53/sq mi)
- Time zone: UTC+1 (CET)
  - Summer (DST): UTC+2 (CEST)

Dol is a village in Croatia, close to the town of Postira on the island Brač. It has a population of 130.
