= Škrip =

- Village
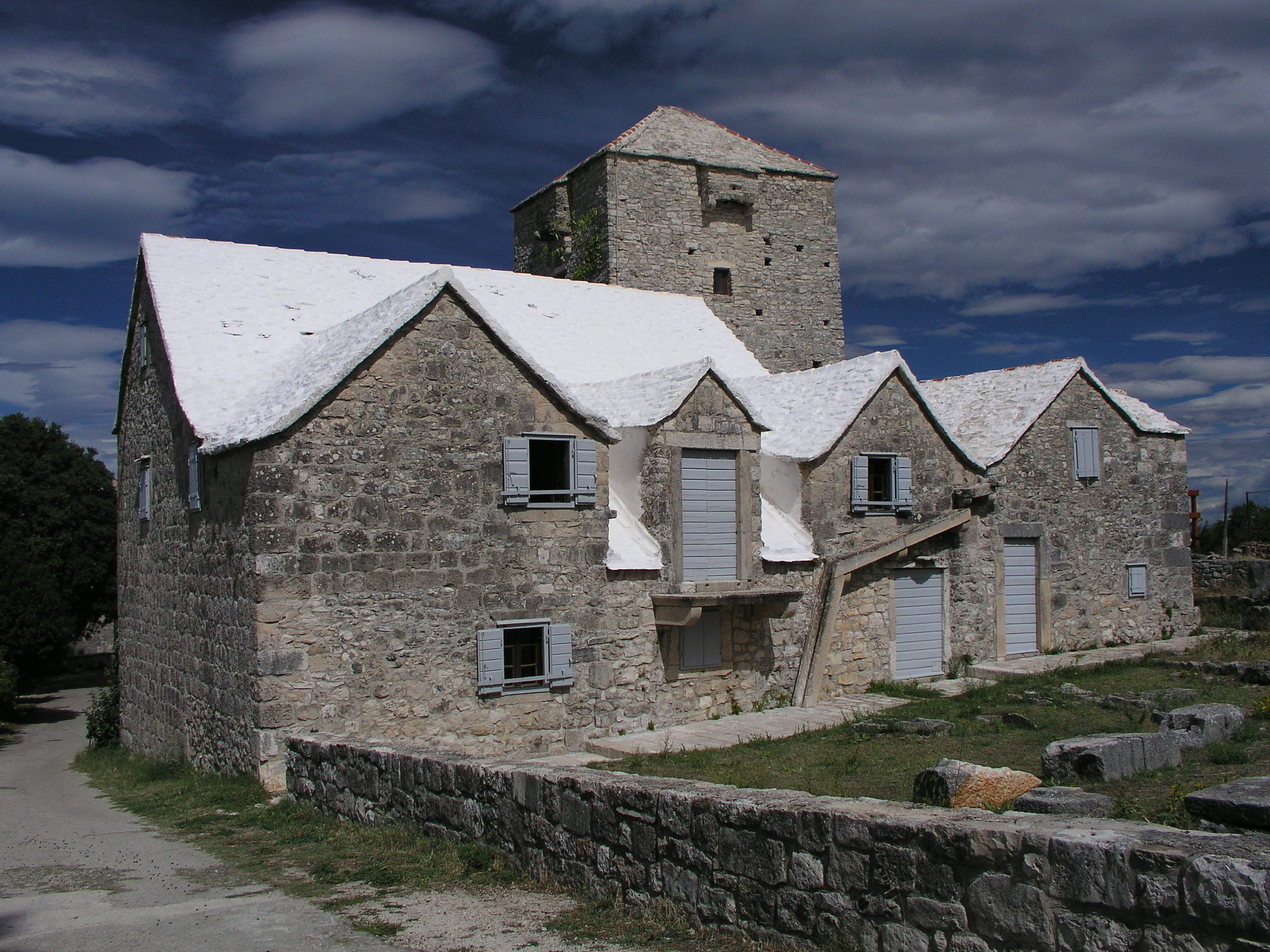

- Location within Croatia
- Country: Croatia
- County: Split-Dalmatia County
- Municipality: City of Supetar

Area
  - Total: 5.8 km^{2} (2.2 sq mi)

Population (2021)
  - Total: 157
  - Density: 27/km^{2} (70/sq mi)
- Time zone: UTC+1 (CET)
  - Summer (DST): UTC+2 (CEST)

Škrip is a village in Croatia. It is the oldest settlement on the island Brač.
