= Supetar =

Town in Split-Dalmatia, Croatia

- Town
- Grad Supetar; Town of Supetar
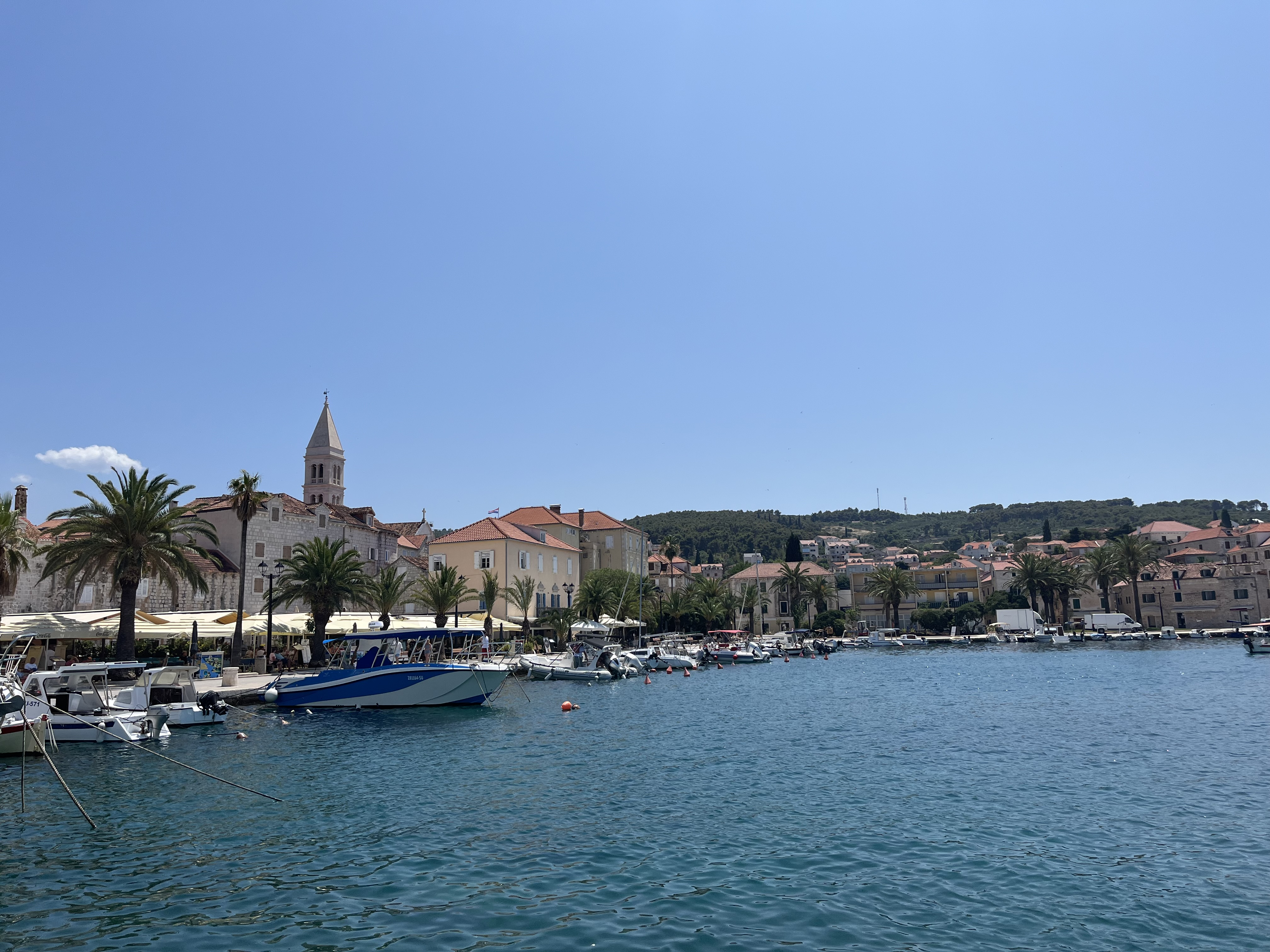
- Supetar waterfront in June 2025

- Location of Supetar in Croatia
- Coordinates: 43°23′04″N 16°33′19″E
- Country: Croatia
- Region: Dalmatia
- County: Split-Dalmatia County
- Island: Brač

Government
  - Type: Mayor-council
  - Mayor: Ivana Marković (SDP)

Area
  - Town: 29.8 km^{2} (11.5 sq mi)
  - Urban: 9.6 km^{2} (3.7 sq mi)
- Elevation: 0 m (0 ft)

Population (2021)
  - Town: 4,325
  - Density: 145/km^{2} (376/sq mi)
  - Urban: 3,415
  - Urban density: 360/km^{2} (920/sq mi)
- Time zone: UTC+1 (CET)
  - Summer (DST): UTC+2 (CEST)
- Postal code: 21 400
- Area code: 021
- Licence plate: ST
- Website: gradsupetar.hr

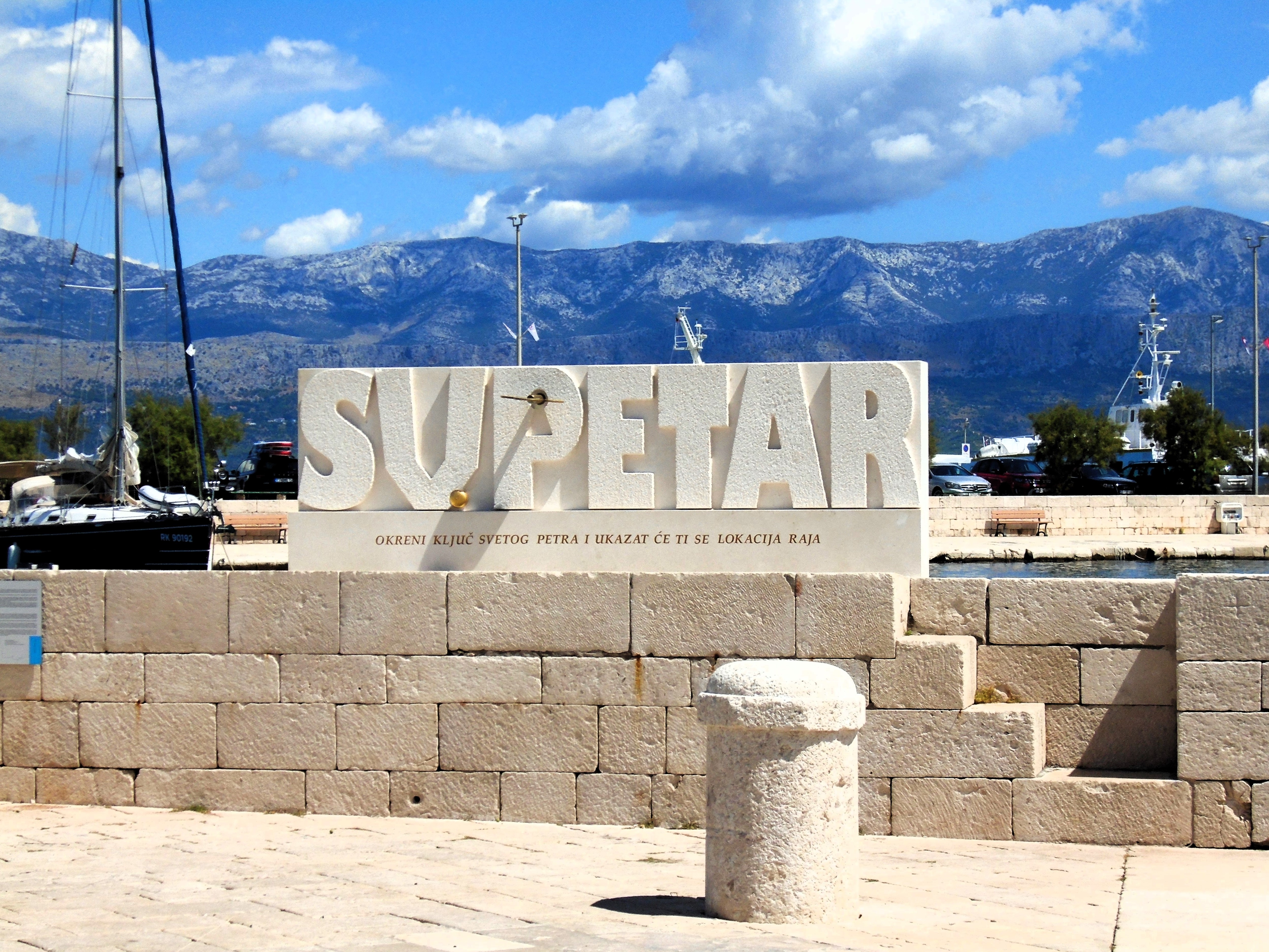
Place name sign in the Supetar harbour

Supetar (Croatian pronunciation: [sǔpetar]) is a town on the northern part of the Dalmatian island of Brač, in the Split-Dalmatia County, in Croatia. It became the island's official centre in 1827. The town of Supetar includes Supetar itself and the three villages of Splitska, Škrip and Mirca.

With a population of 3,213, Supetar is the island's largest town. It is accessible by ferry (Jadrolinija, the ferry ride from the mainland city of Split takes 50 minutes) or via Brač Airport which is located 30 kilometres to the southeast.

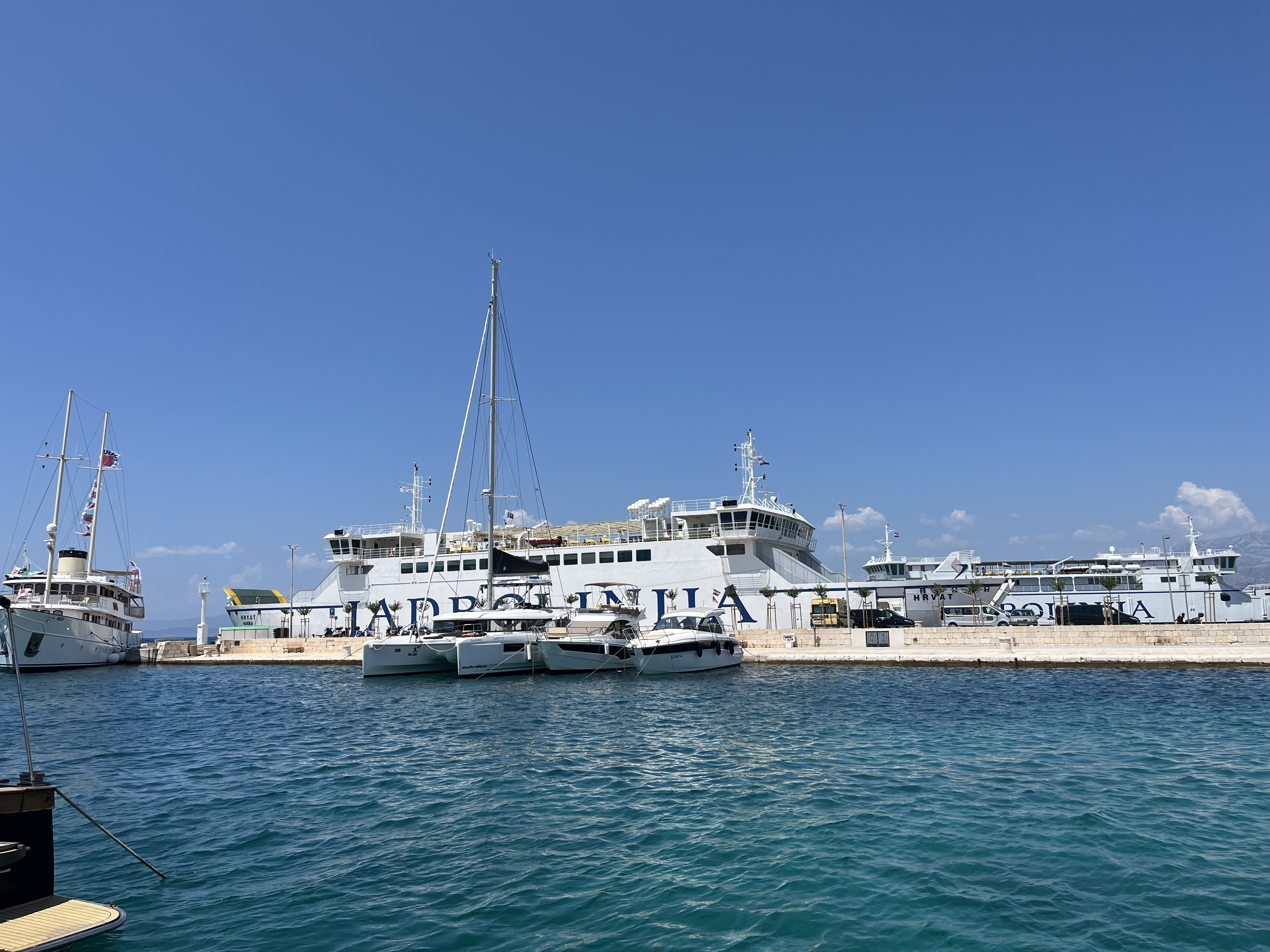
MF Hrvat docked in Supetar Harbour in June 2025

== History ==
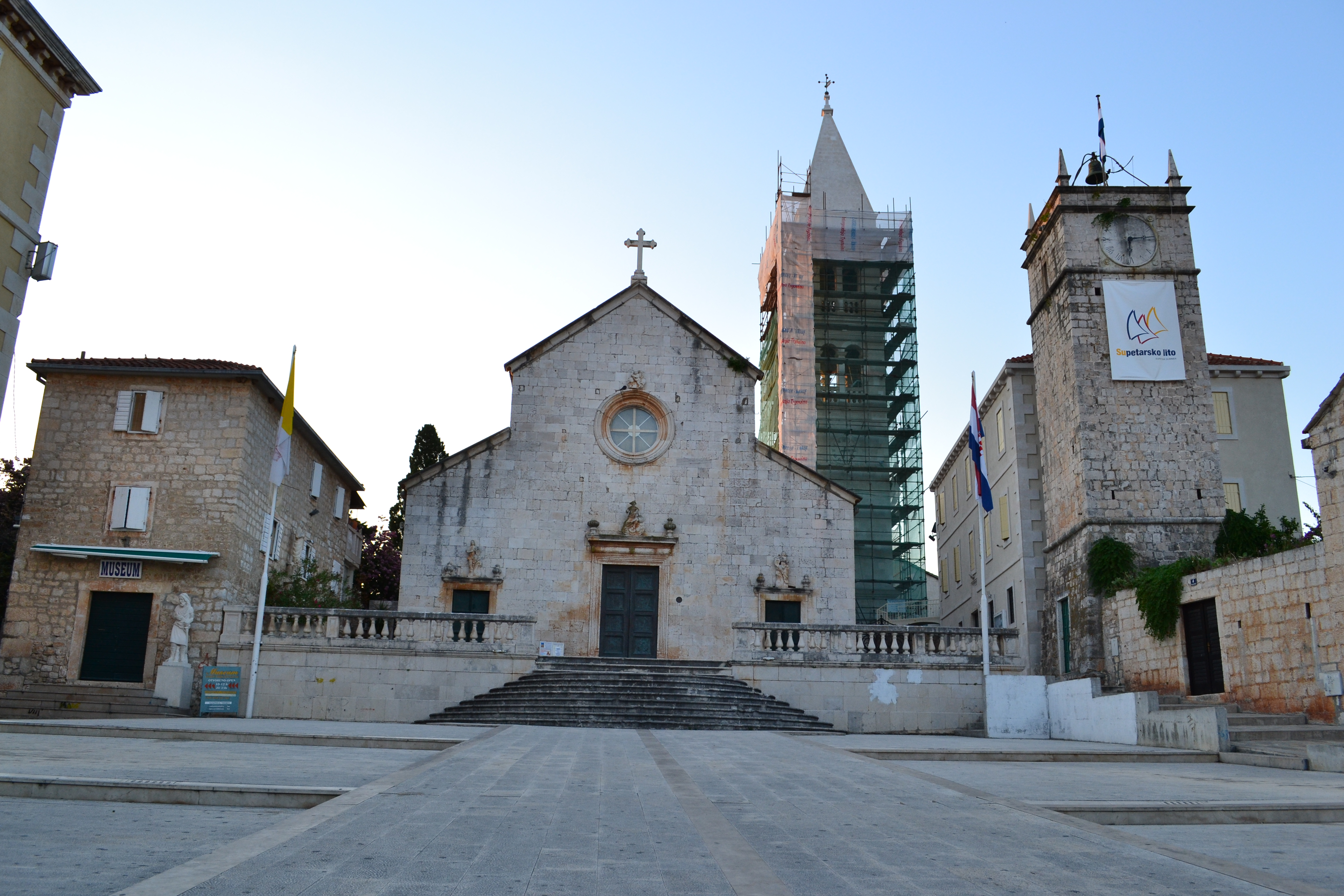
Church of Saint Peter in Supetar

Old Supetar was situated on the small peninsula where there is now a graveyard. The settlement came to an end during the early Christian era. In the late Middle Ages, a new settlement started around the bay known as St. Peter's, from which the town derives its name. The town was called something like *Sanpetro in the Romance language spoken on Brač in early medieval times, and Romance -an- in front of a consonant regularly got borrowed as a nasal 'o' into Old Croatian (also from Germanic languages, and not only early Romance languages, which is why there is a name Fruška gora instead of *Franška gora, named after the Germanic tribe of Franks), and the nasal 'o' gives 'u' in Modern Croatian, giving the modern name Supetar.

The present settlement of Supetar was founded in the 16th century when people living in Nerežišća, about 8 kilometres (5 miles) inland, began to use it as their harbour. The town's main period of development occurred during the 18th and 19th centuries when Supetar took over from Nerežišća as the administrative centre of the island of Brač.

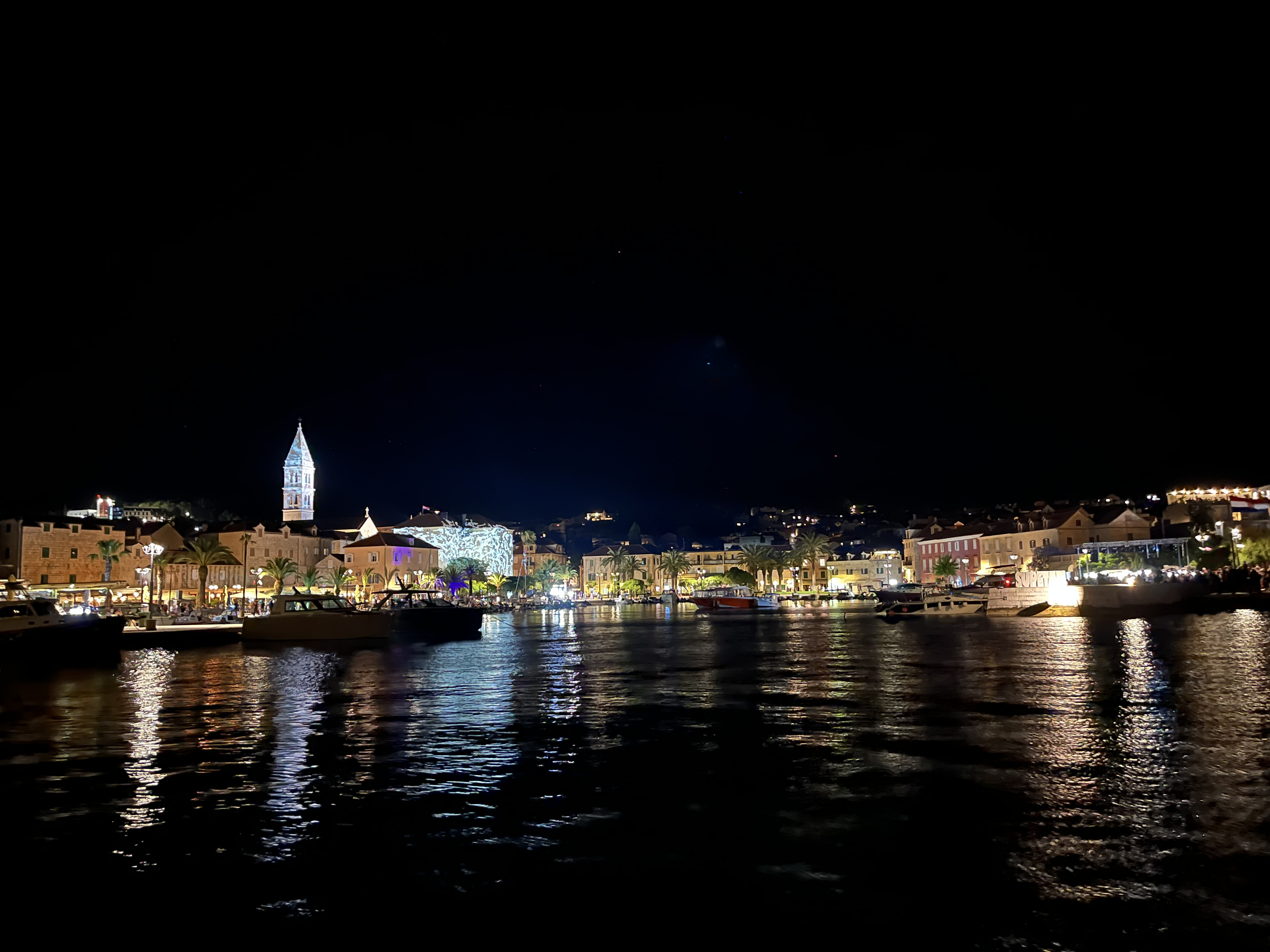
Sveti Petar Festival in June 2025

Every year in June, Supetar has an annual festival for Saint Peter’s day, the patron saint of Supetar.

== The town ==
The Parish church of St. Peter (Sveti Petar) stands on the side of an old chapel which was restored in 1773 in a Baroque architectural style. At that time it also received a new aisle and bell tower. It was extended in 1887. In the church there are paintings by the local artist Feliks Tironi from the second half of the 18th century and a Baroque altarpiece by an unknown Venetian artist of the 18th century.

In the old part of the church there are some gravestones with Croatian inscriptions and at the entrance to the church there is a font made of two large Gothic capitals. On the left of the church building there is a sundial and beneath it a sarcophagus with the date 1774 engraved. In the Sunday school classrooms there are paintings from the Venetian era (16th and 17th centuries). The well, decorated with reliefs, is the work of Johannes Mazzonius from 1734.

Supetar graveyard beside the Chapel St. Nicholas (Sveti Nikola Putnik) there are two old Christian sarcophagi and several gravestones (Pieta), which are the work of Ivan Rendić of Supetar (1849–1932), and the mausoleum of the Petrinović family with portraits and sculptures, by the sculptor Toma Rosandić (1878–1958).

== Population ==
Town of Supetar: Population trends 1857–2021
v

population	2571	2833	2951	3057	3239	3062	2637	2623	2425	2507	2486	2389	2815	3324	3889	4074	4325
	1857	1869	1880	1890	1900	1910	1921	1931	1948	1953	1961	1971	1981	1991	2001	2011	2021

Sources: Croatian Bureau of Statistics publications

== Supetar in the news ==
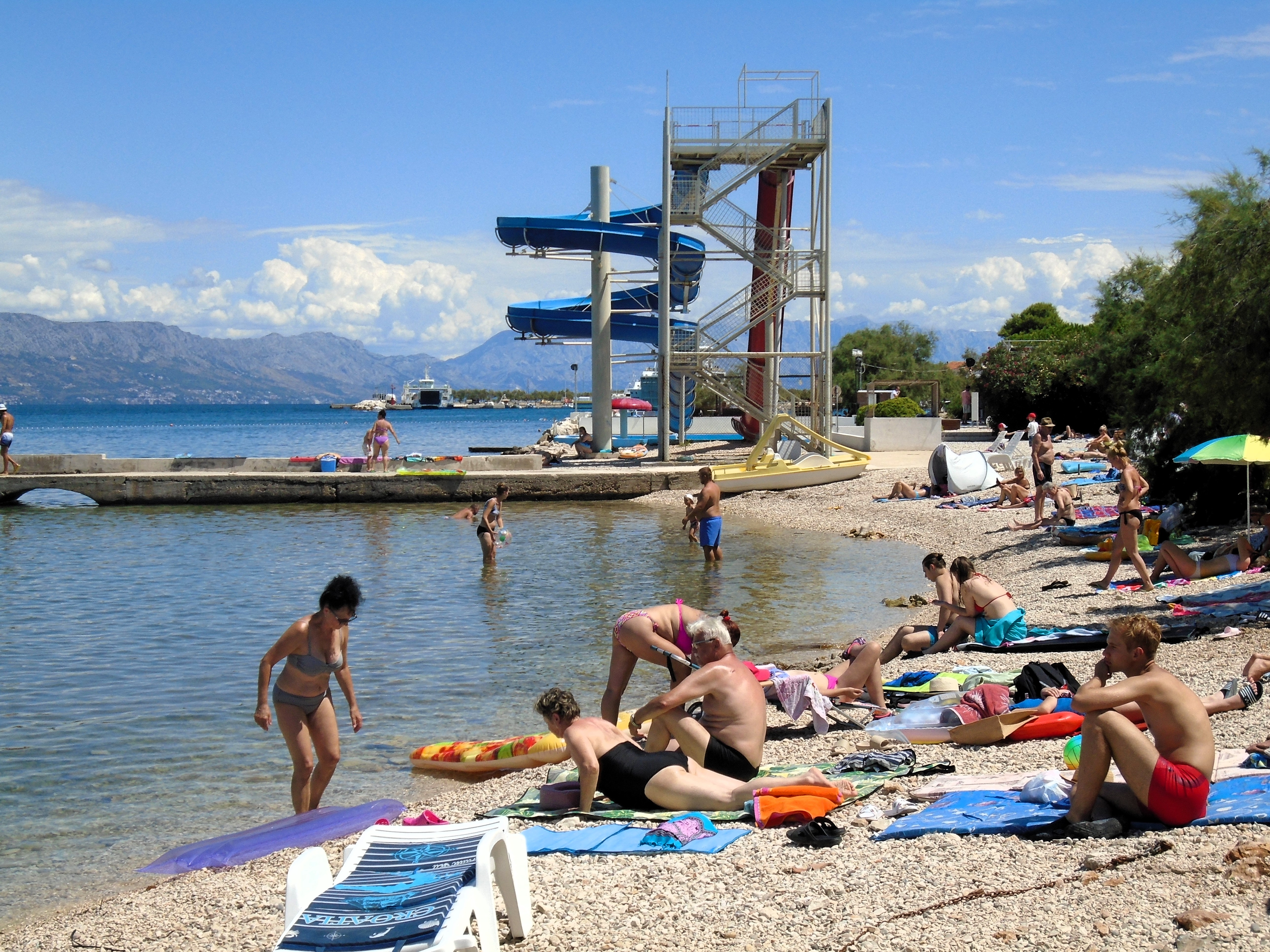
Vlačica Beach in Supetar

Slobodna Dalmacija daily reported in 2009 that a housing development called Adriatica is being built in McKinney, Texas, United States, by real estate developer Jeff Blackard as a partial faithful replica of Supetar.

== Notable people ==
- Kažimir Hraste (born 1954), sculptor, illustrator, professor
- Tonči Matulić (born 1966), Catholic priest, author, university professor, and bioethicist
