= Studenac Market =

Croatian supermarket chain

Studenac Ltd.
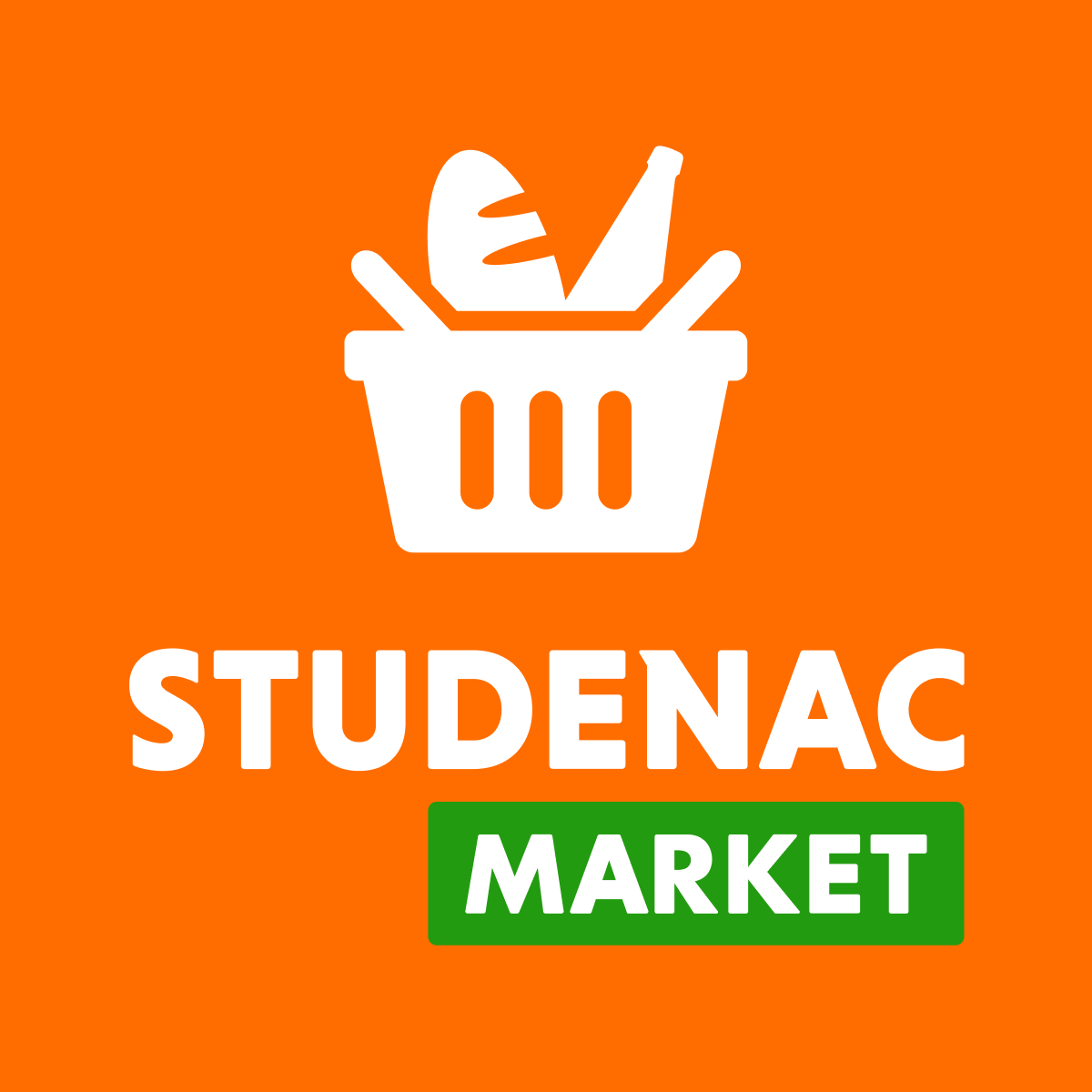
- Founded: 1991; 34 years ago in Omiš, Croatia
- Founder: Josip Milavić
- Products: Food; Drinks; Household products
- Services: Retail
- Owner: Enterprise Fund VIII (part of Enterprise Investors)
- Number of employees: > 6,200 (2024.)
- Website: studenac.hr

Studenac Market is a retail chain of neighborhood markets that is headquartered in Omiš, Croatia. With more than 6200 employees and more than 1200 stores, it has one of the largest sales network in Croatia.. It belongs to the Polish investment fund Enterprise Investors, which acquired a 100% stake in 2018.

== History ==
Since 1991, Studenac Market has been operating as a business. It opened multiple retail locations in Omiš and a wholesale warehouse in Duće in the late 1990s as part of its commercial expansion. Due to its expansion, the business eventually became a retail chain. The success of the Studenac Market of today was greatly impacted by 2018. In 2019, the company expanded its reach around the Adriatic coast and solidified its market position by purchasing Istarski supermarketi and Sonik from Zadar. By acquiring the Biograd retail chain Bure Trgovina d.o.o. in 2021, it further cemented its position on the Adriatic coast. In 2022, Studenac takes over Pemo, Kordun, Duravit and the Lonia chain. Opening the first outlets in Zagreb was a significant commercial achievement. Additionally, Strahinjčica, Spar, and Lavor Trade chain acquisitions were announced by Studenac in 2023.
