= Pučišća =

Municipality on Brač, Croatia

- Municipality
- Pučišća harbor

- Coat of arms
- Motto: Česta kaplja kamen dube ("Constant dripping wears the stone")
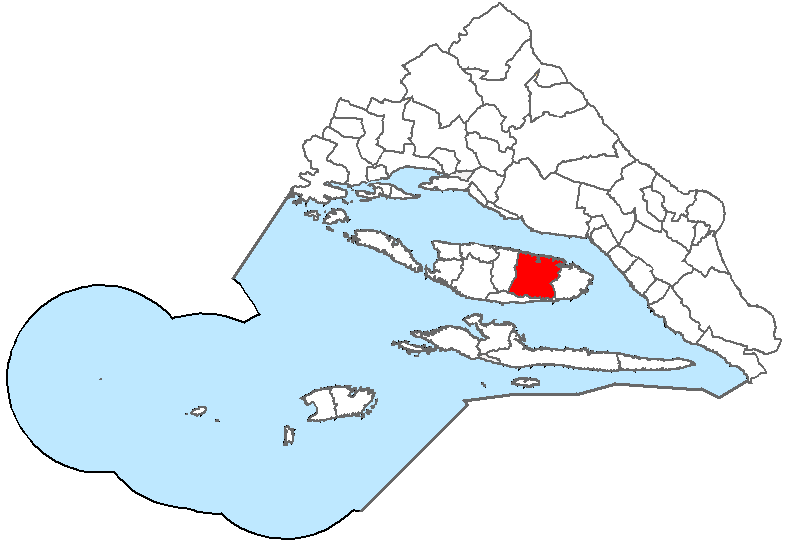
- The municipality of Pučišća within the Split-Dalmatia County
- Interactive map of Pučišća
- Location of Pučišća in Croatia
- Coordinates: 43°20′51″N 16°43′54″E
- Country: Croatia
- Region: Dalmatia
- County: Split-Dalmatia County
- Island: Brač

Government
  - Općinski načelnik: Marino Kaštelan (HDZ)

Area
  - Municipality: 106.2 km^{2} (41.0 sq mi)
  - Urban: 43.6 km^{2} (16.8 sq mi)
- Elevation: 0 m (0 ft)

Population (2021)
  - Municipality: 1,926
  - Density: 18.14/km^{2} (46.97/sq mi)
  - Urban: 1,341
  - Urban density: 30.8/km^{2} (79.7/sq mi)
- Time zone: UTC+1 (CET)
  - Summer (DST): UTC+2 (CEST)
- Postal code: 21412 Pučišća
- Area code: 021
- Licence plate: ST
- Website: pucisca.hr

Pučišća (Croatian pronunciation: [pûtʃiːʃt͡ɕa]) is a coastal town and a municipality on the island of Brač in Croatia. It is often listed as one of the prettiest villages in Europe. It is known for its white limestone and beautiful bay. The town has a population of 1,351 (2021 census).

Many of the buildings are built with local stone, and so are the numerous monuments which adorn the town. Stone has long been a major part of Pučišćas economy and self-image. Jadrankamen, the largest stone quarry company in Europe, is located here, as is Croatia's only stonemason school. A number of historic quarries, some of them going back to Roman times, can be found further east.

It was a privilege of the aristocrats and the stonemasons (called artišti) to live at the waterfront of Pučišća (called riva). This, and the easy access to the white limestone from the local quarries, gave Pučišća its look. The houses at the waterfront were spacious and wealthy. The higher you climb up the hill, the smaller the historic houses become.

== Etymology ==
The local folk etymology explains that Pučišća used to be called Spuzišća (from the Croatian word spustiti or spuziti, to climb or to slide down), remembering their move here from the uphill and inland settlements of Pražnica and Straževnik in the 15th century.

Academics derive the name from the Latin word puteus for fountain. The word was later Croatized as puč, and got the chakavian suffix šće, indicating an open area.

== Geography ==
Pučišća lies at the end of a deep natural bay on the northern coast of Brač, which in the summer months gives its harbour protection from the winds of the open sea. The bay splits in two arms, Stipanska luka ('Stephen's harbour') to the east and Pučinski dolac ('Pučišća's valley') to the west. From the waterfront, the island rises quickly, giving the town an amphitheater-like appearance. Suggestively, the deepest point of the harbour is called Talija.

Pučišća is connected to the rest of the island via the municipal road Ž6161 to Postira, loosely following the northern coast of the island westwards, and the serpentine municipal road Ž6193 to Pražnica inland. A street eastwards to Povlja is being built. Pučišća can also be reached by boat, although there are no regular ferry services.

== History ==
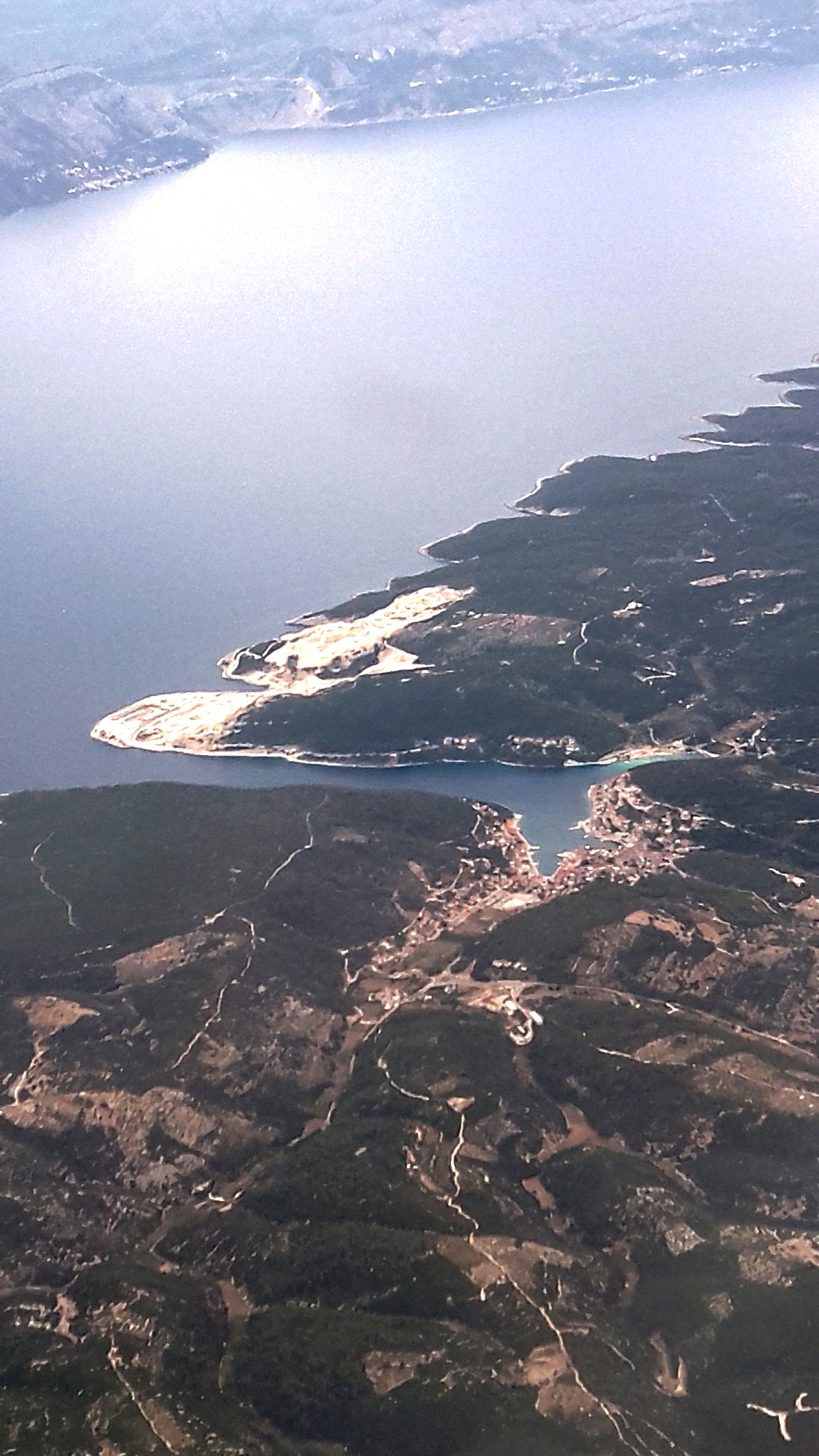
Aearial view of Pučišća. The top of the picture points north east. To the upper left is the Dalmatian mainland, separated through the Brač channel. The white area above the mouth of the bay of Pučišća is the quarry Veselje. The bay splits to Stipinska luka on the right and Pučiški dolac to the bottom.

Archeological findings, such as an altar of Jupiter and a Roman grave stele, show that Stipanska luka was settled in Roman times. In the 11th century, there has likely been a cloister of the Benedictines and a church named after Saint Stephen. At the same time, in Pučinski dolac, which was deep in the island, a small settlement of goatherds formed. Pirate attacks forced the population to move further inland though: Pražnica was likely founded by the people of Pučinski dolac, and the now abandoned Straževnik (on the way to Gornji Humac) from Stipanska luka. Later, also refugees fleeing from the Osman invasion coming from the Dalmatian mainland settled here.

Documents show sales of land for housing in 1382, 1410, and later. People from Pražnica were moving to the Pučinski dolac, and staying there. In 1411, a document mentions a church of Saint Stephen in Pučinski dolac. There are also people moving to Stipinska luka. But both localities were still abandoned a few times, to flee from attacks of Omiš pirates. In 1420, Venetian rule was established on the island, and in 1452 the Omiš pirates were finally subjugated by Venice as well. After centuries of pirate attacks, the new found peace allowed a number of families to settle and build their new permanent homes at the coast, and the name Pučišća became established. Settlers from interior of Brač, particularly from Straževnik and Pražnice, moved to Pučišća, as well as refugees from the mainland, particularly after the fall of Bosnia. But peace was fleeting.

Soon, Turkish attacks as part of the Croatian-Ottoman wars became a threat. But this time, instead of giving up Pučišća, in 1467 Ciprijan Žuvetić built the first kaštel (a small, fortified tower) in the young town to counter possible Turkish attacks. Eventually, thirteen kaštela dotted the coastline: following Žuvetić was Ante Akvila, then Prodić, Mladinić, Pinešić, Andrijević-Ivelić, Davidović, Čipičić, Bokanić, Radojković, Grego, Cicarelli, Katković, and Bilavić. The fortresses gave the town the name luka kula (Croatian, 'harbour of fortresses'). Of these thirteen, four are still preserved. The building of the fortressed paid off: a large attack by Turkish forces in 1571 was successfully repelled. A Venetian document from 1600 calls the town castrum (Italian, 'fortress').

Ciprijan Žuvetić started building a new church in 1442, the Church of Mary of the Ascension on Batak. He added a belltower and a graveyard to the church. The church grew and became strong enough to get its own priest, and on 9 August 1533, the Bishop of Šibenik Giovanni Lucio Stafileo (Ivan Lucić) consecrated the church.

In 1461, Pražnice started building a new parish church consecrated to Antun Opat (Saint Anthony the Hermit) to replace the one in Straževnik, and thus also as the new parish church for Pučišća.

A meeting of representatives from Pučišća, Pražnica, and Straževnik on 15 August 1566 decided to split Pučišća off together with Straževnik from Pražnica to form a new parish. Don Bernardin Prodić became the first parish priest of Pučišća. This started the building of a new parish church, which was finished and consecrated to Saint Jerome in 1576. By that time the population of Straževnik had fully moved to Pučišća.

Stonemasons and artists working with the local stone made the material famous during the Renaissance. Examples of such artists were Giorgio da Sebenico (1410–1473) or Andreas Alessi (1425–1505). Ivan Puljizić (17th century), a military engineer, builder and constructor, was born in Pučišća and worked at the court of Pope Innocent X.

Pučišća became one of the main cultural centers of Brač. In 1516 the first private school of the island was founded. The school was mentioned in a 1595 document to be attended by children of the noble and rich families from all over the island. The major historians of the island come from Pučišća: Vicko Prodić (1628–1666), Petar Dominis (1654–1728), Trifun Mladinić (1680–1708), and Andrija Ciccarelli (1759–1823). Also the writers Jure Žuvetić (16th century) and Sabe Mladinić (17th century) are from Pučišća.

Pučišća's history followed the history of Dalmatia: the Venetian rule ended in 1797 after almost four centuries, and in the next two decades, Brač repeatedly changed hands between France, Italy, and Austria-Hungary, and was even conquered by Montenegrin forces with Russian support for a short time. In 1815 the situation stabilized under Austria-Hungary, where it remained until its disintegration. In 1823 Austria-Hungary designated Pučišća to be the administrative center of the eastern part of the island, which it remained until 1885 when Selca was split off.

The oldest library on the island was founded here in 1868. The probably best known sculptors from Pučišća are Branislav Dešković (1883–1939) and Valerije Michielli (1922–1981), who worked with stone and bronze.

Like most settlements in Brač, Pučišćas population peaked in the early 20th century. Since then, particularly due to heavy emigration, most prominently to Chile and the United States, the town has lost more than a third of its population.

During World War II, in 1943, an attack of the Italian army damaged the town heavily.

== Municipality ==
The municipality of Pučišća includes the inland settlements Gornji Humac and Pražnica, which are connected to Pučišća with a serpentine road. Part of its municipal responsibilities is still taken care of in Supetar, which is the islands largest settlement, and which has been the administrative center of the whole island until the administrative reform following Croatian independence in 1991.

== Demographics ==
In 2021, the municipality had 1926 residents in the following 3 settlements:

- Gornji Humac, population 276
- Pražnica, population 309
- Pučišća, population 1341

In 2011, 98,62% of the population were Croats, and 95.30% Catholic.

Population census of the municipality
Year	1857	1869	1880	1890	1900	1910	1921	1931	1948	1961	1971	1981	1991	2001	2011	2021
Pop.	1,978	2,433	2,720	3,387	3,620	3,616	3,068	2,861	2,461	2,566	2,354	2,397	2,393	2,224	2,171	1,934
±%	—	+23.0%	+11.8%	+24.5%	+6.9%	−0.1%	−15.2%	−6.7%	−14.0%	+4.3%	−8.3%	+1.8%	−0.2%	−7.1%	−2.4%	−10.9%
Source: Državni zavod za statistiku

Municipality of Pučišća: Population trends 1857–2021
v

population	1978	2433	2720	3387	3620	3616	3068	2861	2461	2599	2566	2354	2397	2393	2224	2171	1926
	1857	1869	1880	1890	1900	1910	1921	1931	1948	1953	1961	1971	1981	1991	2001	2011	2021

Sources: Croatian Bureau of Statistics publications

Population census of the town
Year	1579	1614	1637	1645	1763	1857	1869	1880	1890	1900	1910	1931	1948	1961	1971	1981	1991	2001	2011	2021
Pop.	330	300	460	600	680	1,218	1,526	1,722	2,169	2,290	2,297	1,815	1,587	1,663	1,588	1,706	1,706	1,602	1,529	1,351
±%	—	−9.1%	+53.3%	+30.4%	+13.3%	+79.1%	+25.3%	+12.8%	+26.0%	+5.6%	+0.3%	−21.0%	−12.6%	+4.8%	−4.5%	+7.4%	+0.0%	−6.1%	−4.6%	−11.6%
The 1615-1763 numbers are based on sources counting only people who had their First Communion. Source: 1857-2011 Državni zavod za statistiku

== Culture ==
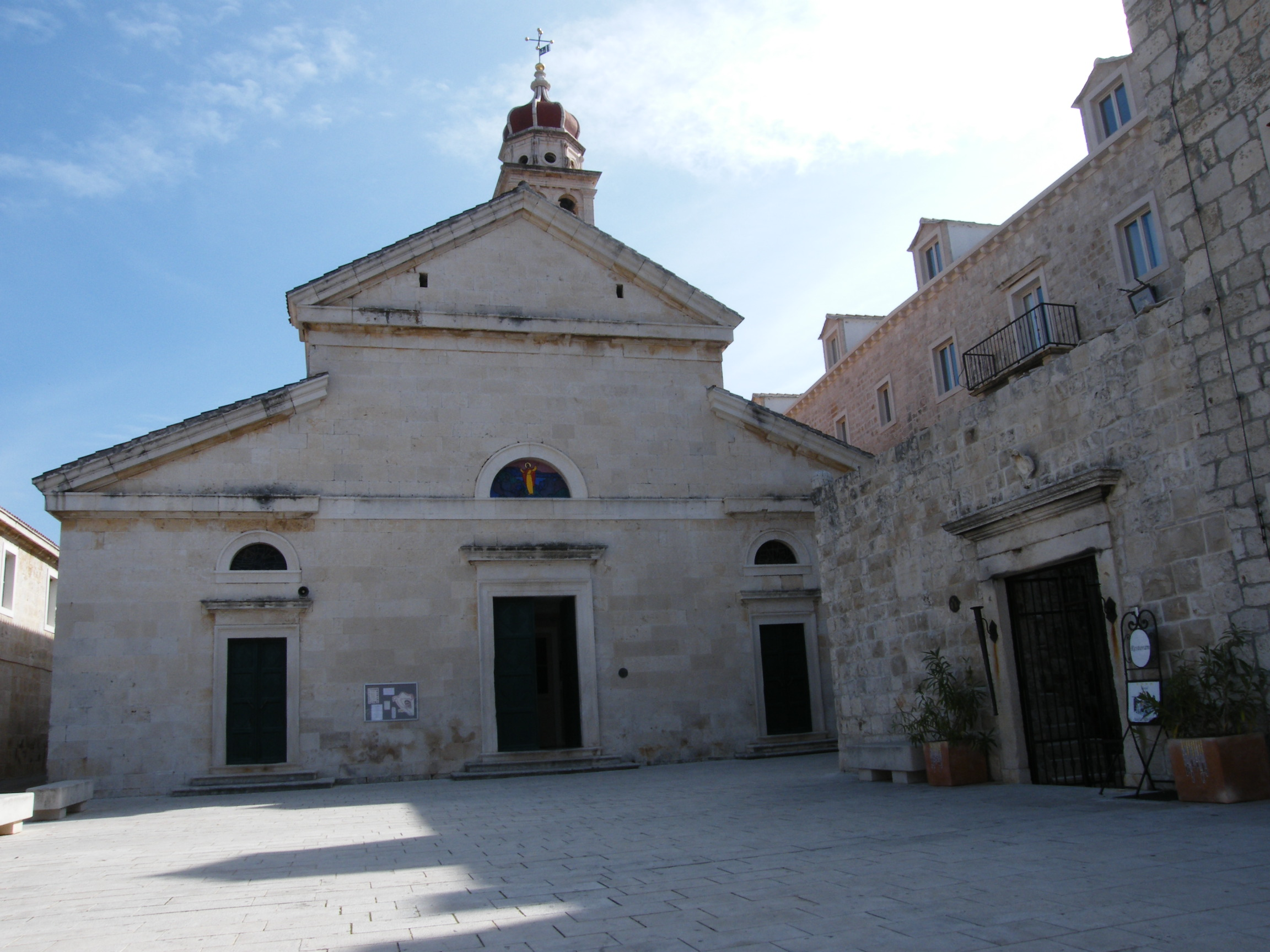
Saint Jerome, the parish church of Pučišća

The most impressive church in Pučišća is the parish church of Saint Jerome (Croatian Sveti Jere), who is also the patron saint of the town. The church was built in 1566 and extended 1750 with baroque elements. It contains a relief of Saint Jerome from 1578, created by the Korčulan artist Čočić. The church also hosts the Charter of Povlja, written in 1250, the oldest document written in Bosnian Cyrillic. The altar picture of Saint Roch was created by Palma the Younger, a student of Titian. The background of the picture shows the city of Split. It was stolen in April 1986, but later found and brought back to Pučišća. The parish has also a rich treasury with sacred artifacts.

The chapel of the lady of Batak, locally also known as the church of Saint Cyprian, was consecrated in 1533, Croatian Gospe od Batka or Sveti Ciprijan. Above the entrance is an inscription dedicated to the main donor Ciprijan Žuvetić and the bishop of Šibenik Ivan Lucić who consecrated the church. On the main altar is a polyptych made of stone displaying Saint Mary with the child and the saints. The church contains sacral artifacts from the 18th and 19th century, most important of them an image of Jesus as a child in wax.

Historical documents talk about a church dedicated to Saint Michael on Mount Čad, east of the town, but today's whereabouts of the church are unknown.

The town has plenty of stone monuments, some centuries old, and some created only recently by the students of the stonemason school.

The 1995 Eurovision Song contestant Lidija Horvat-Dunjko founded the Opera School of Mirula in 2003, in conjunction with the International Summer Music School Pučišća.

=== List of protected cultural goods ===
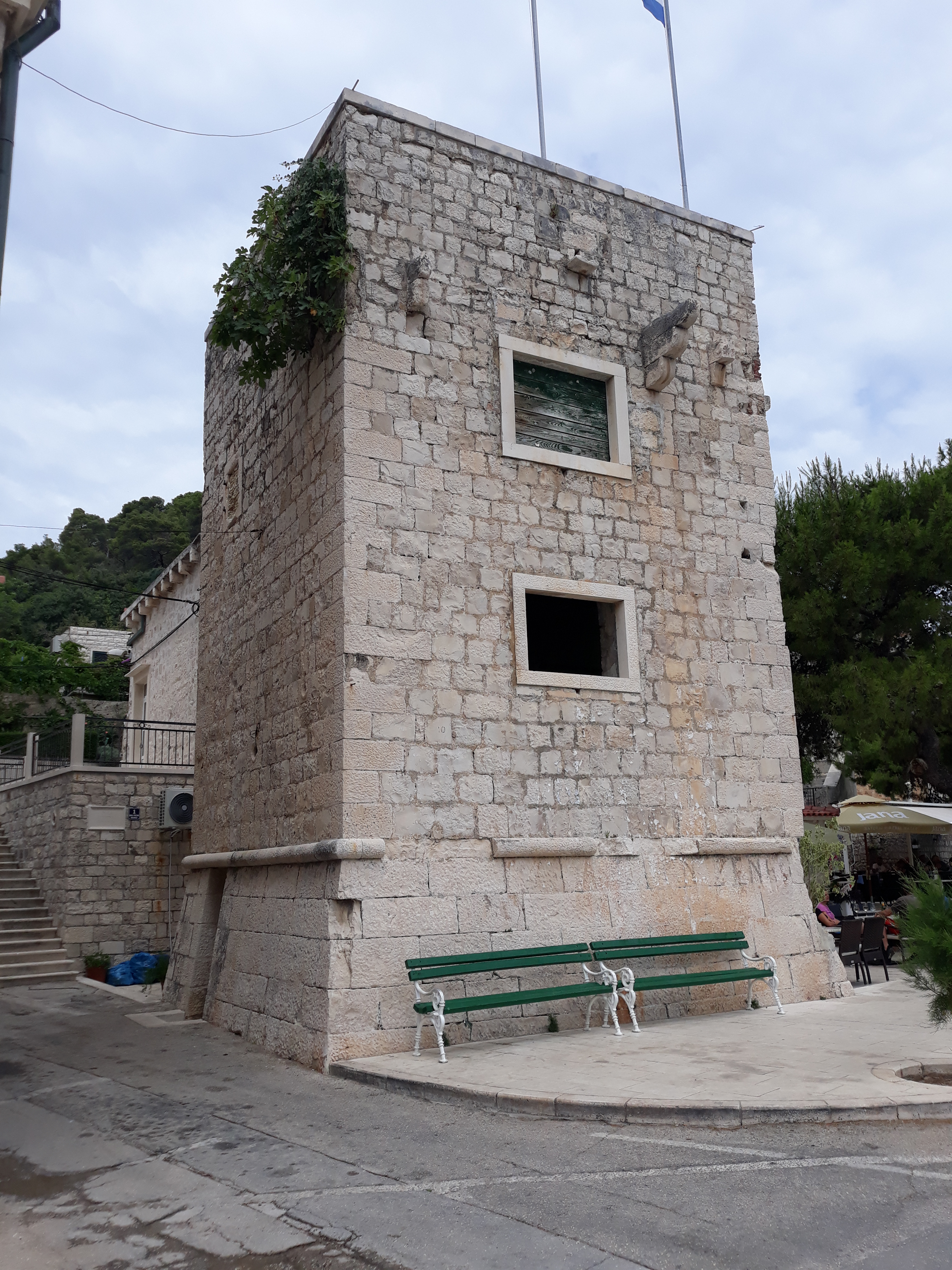
''Kula Aquila'', the tower Akvila, one of the thirteen towers built to protect the city and now depicted in the coat of arms of Pučišća.

The following objects are designated as protected cultural goods:

- the historic center of Pučišća (RST-0645-1972)
- the parish church of St. Jerome (1566, Z-4781)
  - the altar antependium of St. Rochus in said church (17th century, RST-140,24/41-70)
  - organ in said church (18th century, Z-1818)
  - library and archive of Andrija Ciccarelli (18th to 19th century, RST-94,24/78-68)
  - the Charter of Povlja (1250, RST-22, 24/144-66)
  - other inventory of said church (16th to 19th century, RST-294,24/82-7)
- the church of our lady of consolation on the cemetery, originally built in the 6th century and consecrated to St. Stephen, expanded in the 18th (Z-3826)
  - the inventory of said church (17th to 19th century, RST-292,24/60-73)
- Church of our lady of Batak (1533, Z-1869)
  - the inventory of said church (18th and 19th century, RST-293,24/63-73)
- Church of St Georg on Veli Bračuti, east of town (14th century, Z-4681)
- Church of St Lucia (16th century, Z-4574)
  - the inventory of said church (18th to 19th century, RST-291,24/59-73)
- the church of St. Georg in the abandoned village of Straževnik (first mentioned 1111, Z-4779)
- kaštel Ciccarelli (16th century, Z-5296)
- kula Akvila (15th century, Z-3825)
- house Dešković (18th century, Z-3241)
- lighthouse St. Nikola (19th century, Z-1870)
- fragment of a female face (4th century, RST-204,24/91-71)

== Economy ==
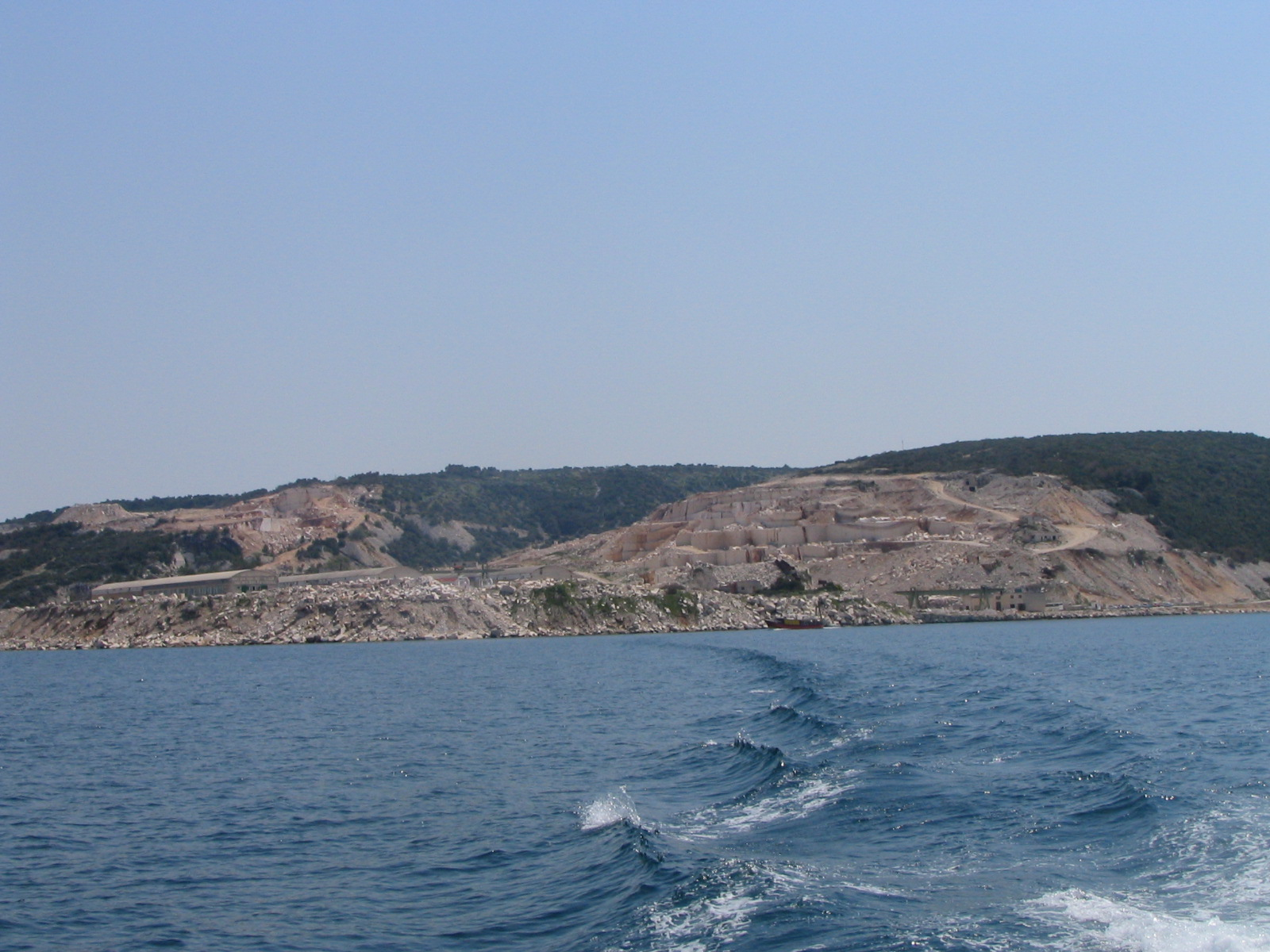
Veselje, the largest stone quarry on Brač.

Stone has traditionally been one of the main sources of income of Pučišća. The stonemason school, founded in 1906, builds on centuries of tradition. It is the only such school in Croatia.

The main limestone quarries are at the coast, east of the bay of Pučišća. The largest one is Veselje ('Happiness'), which belongs to Jadrankamen, the largest European quarry company. Jadrankamen was founded in Pučišća in 1902, and is still headquartered here. The shining white of Veselje is clearly visible from the main land and from aerial pictures. Veselje is already mentioned in documents from 1455, when it was used by Georgio da Sebenico (Croatian Juraj Dalmatinac). A story that is often heard locally is that some of the pure white limestone for the White House came from the quarries near Pučišća. Other quarries close to Pučišća are Tesišće, Punta, and Kupinovo. A number of historic quarries, going back to Roman times, are located close to the town.

Besides stone, the main sources of income have traditionally been winemaking, fishing, olives, husbandry (mainly sheep and goats), and, more recently, tourism.

== Nature ==
Pučišća also features a few areas of protection as habitats of certain species or as natural parks. The cave jama za mahrincem (HR2000056) is protected and houses the species Asthenargus bracianus named after the island of Brač, of the Asthenargus family of spiders, and described by Miller 1938.

The deepest explored cave of the island, jama kod Matešić stana (HR2001200), lies also in the area of Pučišća. It is 285 meters deep.

To the east of Pučišća is the crni rat, a protected natural area (HR3000133).

== Notable residents ==
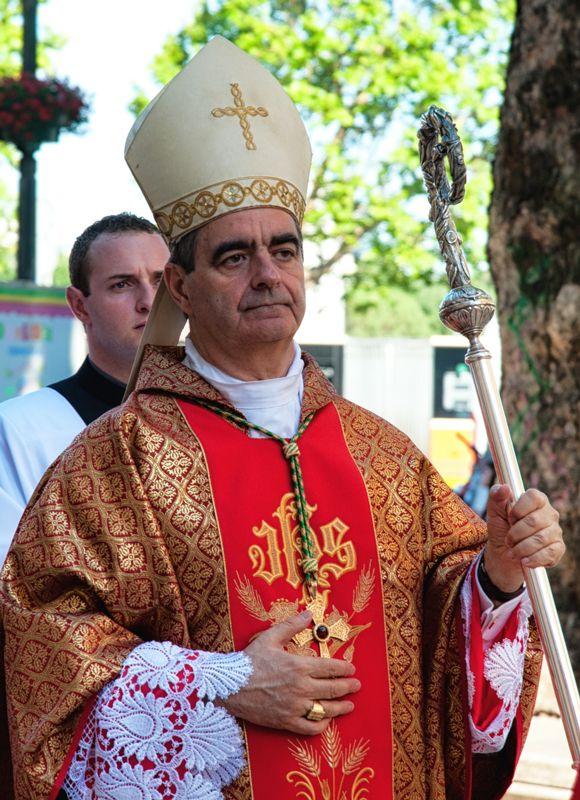
- Nikola Eterović, Apostolic Nuncio to Germany, was born in Pučišća in 1951.
  Josip Baturić (1902–1983), professor in Zagreb for quarries and mining
- Neno Belan (born 1962), singer-songwriter
- Trifun Bokanić (1575–1609), stonemason
- Andrija Ciccarelli or Andrija Čikareli (1759–1823), historian
- Branislav Dešković (1883–1939), sculptor
- Lujo Ivan Moro Dominis (1867-after 1914?), emigrant to Chile, businessman
- Petar Dominis (1654–1728), historian and priest
- Francis Hyacint Eterovich (1913–1981), Dominican encyclopedist
- Nikola Eterović (born 1951), Titular Archbishop and Apostolic Nuncio to Germany
- Juraj Jordan (1880–1949), emigrant to Chile, businessman
- Miro Kačić (1946–2001), linguist
- Josip Lukinović (1866–1939), emigrant to Chile and later France, businessman
- Jerko Martinić (born 1936), ethnomusicologist
- Zdravko Martinić-Jerčić (1928–2008), agronom
- Juraj Matulić Zorinov (1884–1941), emigrant to Chile, journalist and diplomat
- Valerije Michielli (1922–1981), stonemason
- Jeronim Mihaić (1873–1960), Franciscan economist
- Ivan Mladineo (1889–1938), emigrant to the US, journalist
- Don Sabo Mladinić or Sebastianus Mladineus (1561-1563 - 1620/1621), author
- Gaetano Moscatelli (1765–1822), organbuilder
- Tomislav Ostoja (born 1931), stonemason and artist
- Vicko Prodić (1628–1663), historian
- Ivan Puljičić (17th century), military engineer and architect
- Veseljko Sulić (born 1929), ballet dancer and choreograph
- Ivo Vrandečić (born 1927), politician and businessman, president of the Federal Assembly of Yugoslavia and director of Jadranbrod
- Josip Vrandečić (born 1964), professor and historian
- Vesna Vrandečić, singer, member of the band Xenia
- Vlasta Vrandečić Lebarić (born 1953), poet
- Zdenko "Denny" Vrandečić, (born 1978) computer scientist, co-developer of Semantic MediaWiki and Wikidata, the lead of Special Projects of the Wikimedia Foundation
- Doris Vučković, b. Vrandečić, television personality
- Ciprijan Žuvetić (died 1502), builder of the first kaštel
- Juraj Žuvetić (ca. 1560-ca.1606), writer

Some Croatian historians claim that John Owen Dominis, who became prince consort to the last queen of Hawaii, traces his family back to the Dominis (Gospodetnić) family in Pučišća.

Some family names such as Vrandečić and Eterović are uniquely originating in Pučišća.

== Gallery ==
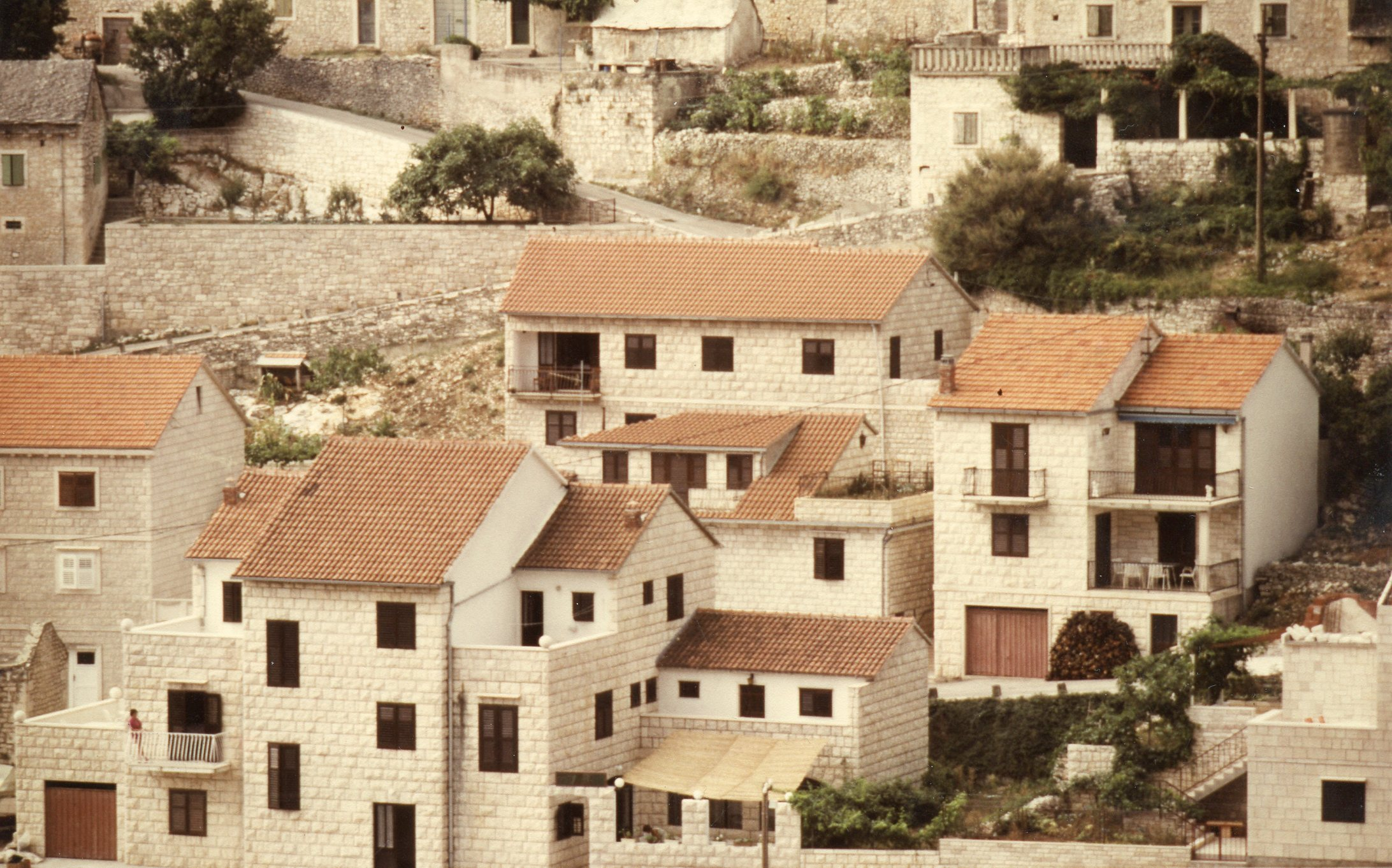
Stone houses in Pučišća dolac

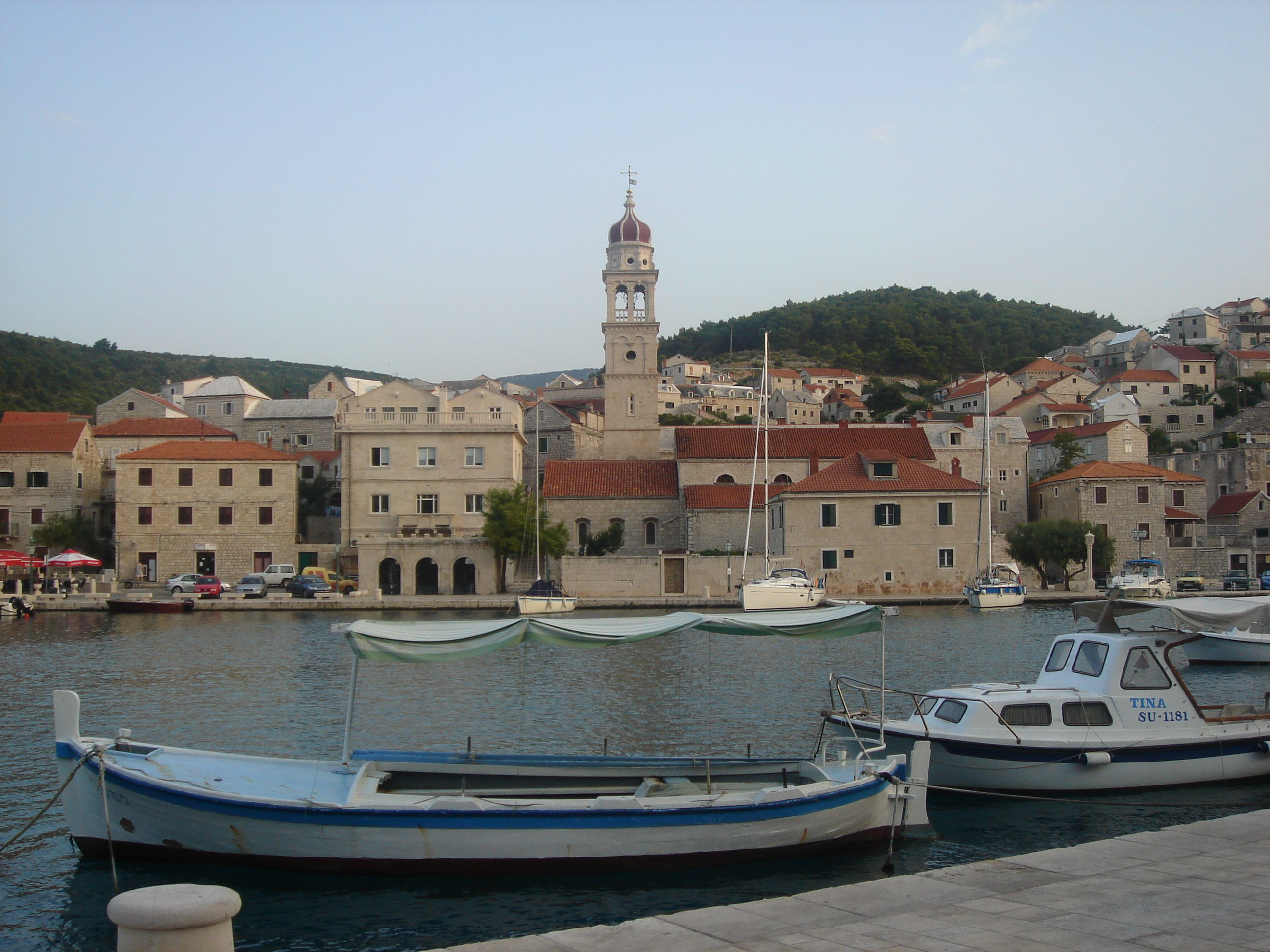
View of the seafront

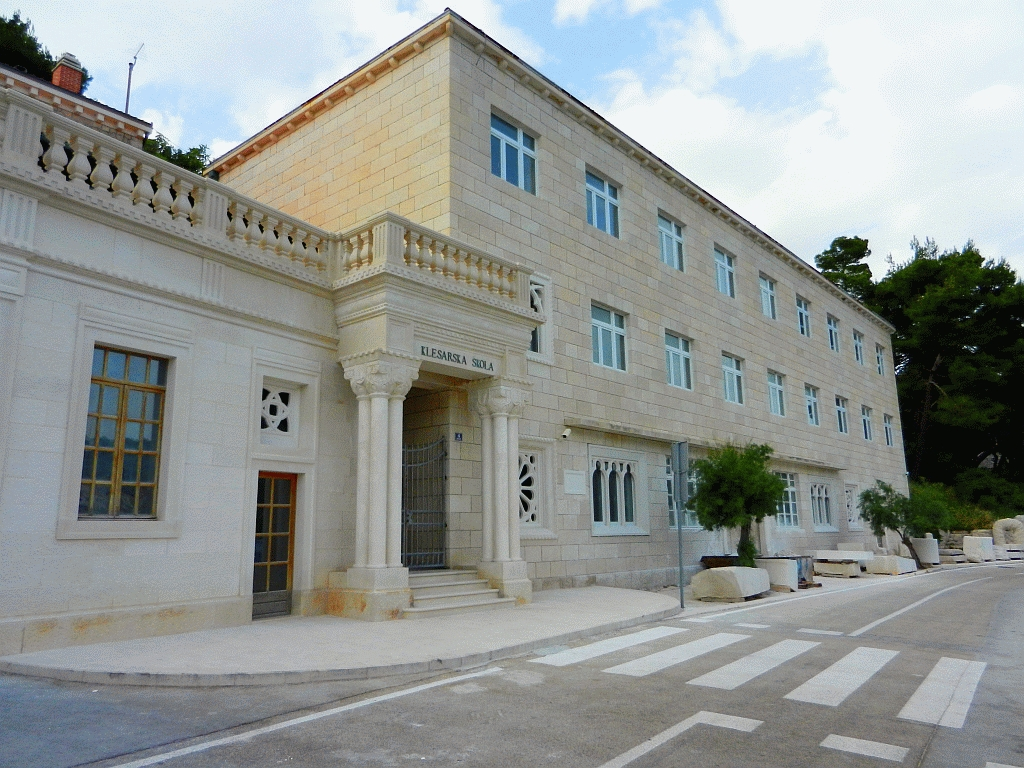
Stonemason school (Klesarska škola).

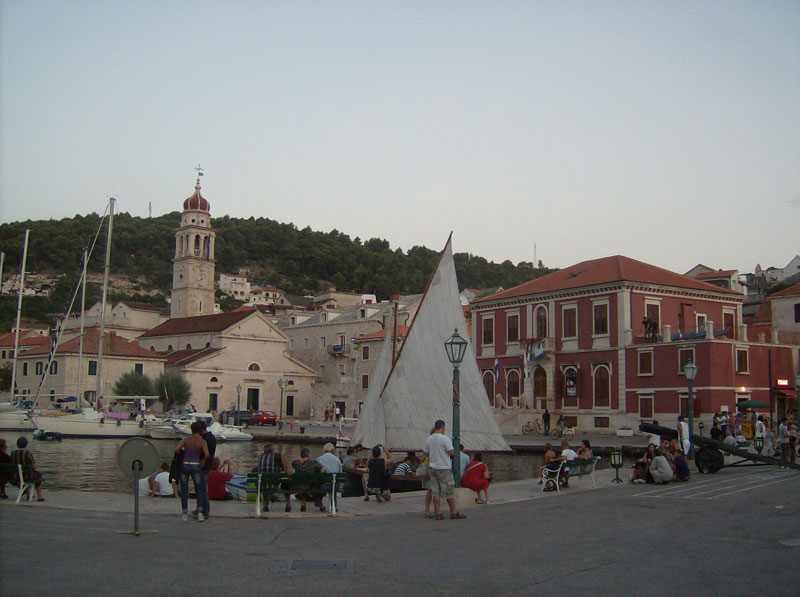
Parish church (left), the administrative building of the municipality (in red, right), and the harbour,

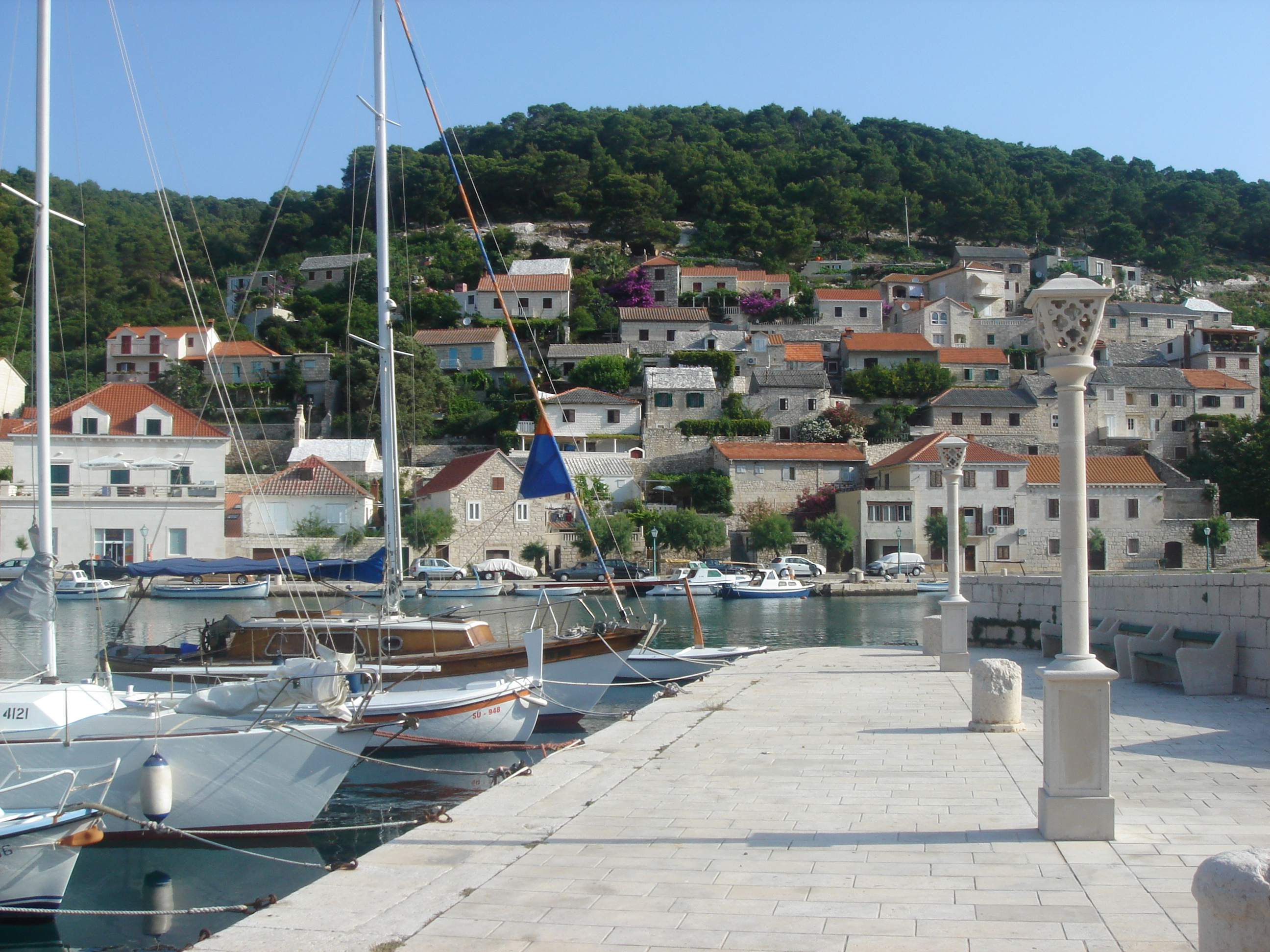
North side of the harbour. The buildings at the harbour are large and spacious, and become smaller as we go uphill.

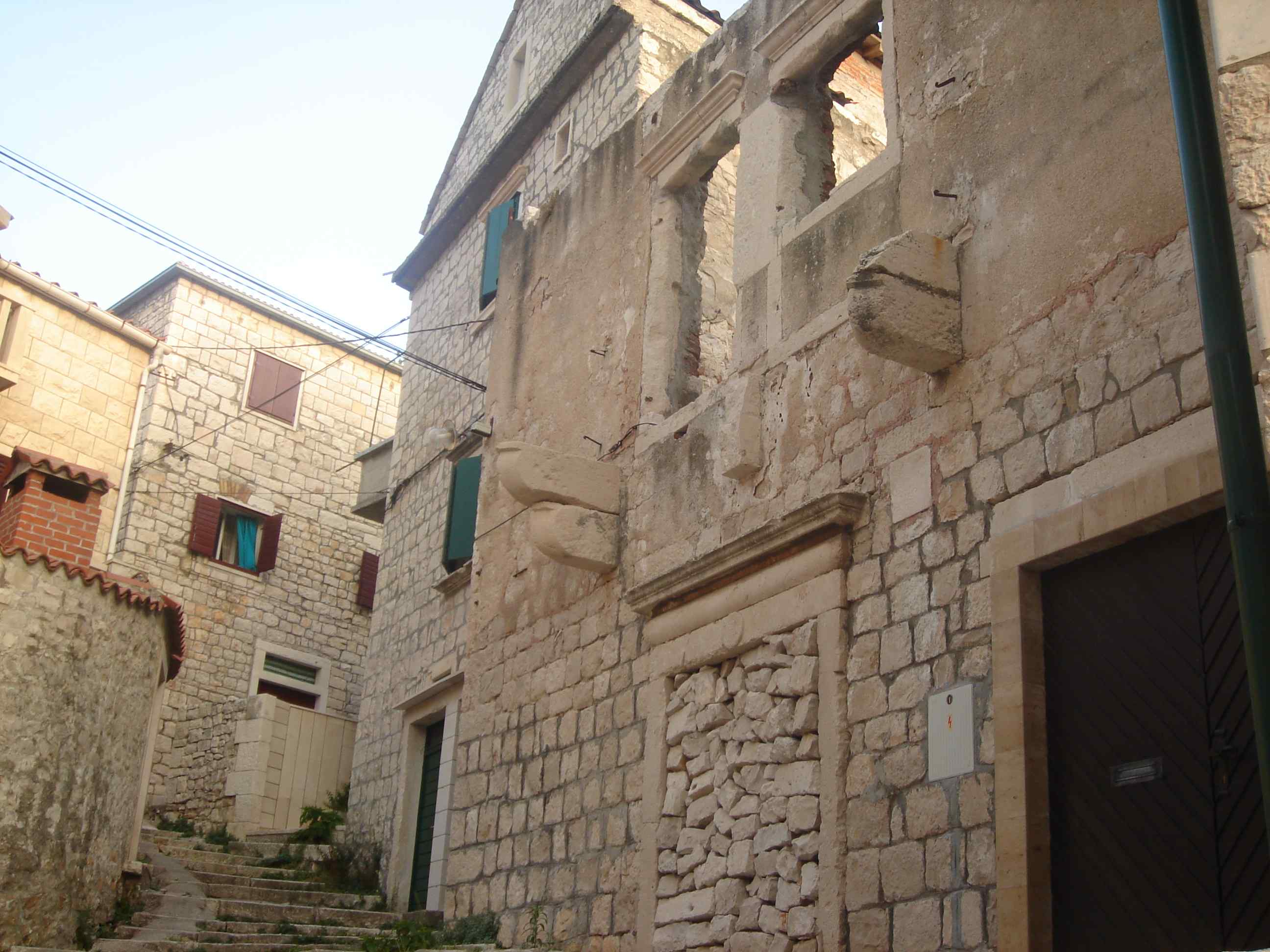
The historic buildings become smaller an tighter as we climb up away from the harbour.

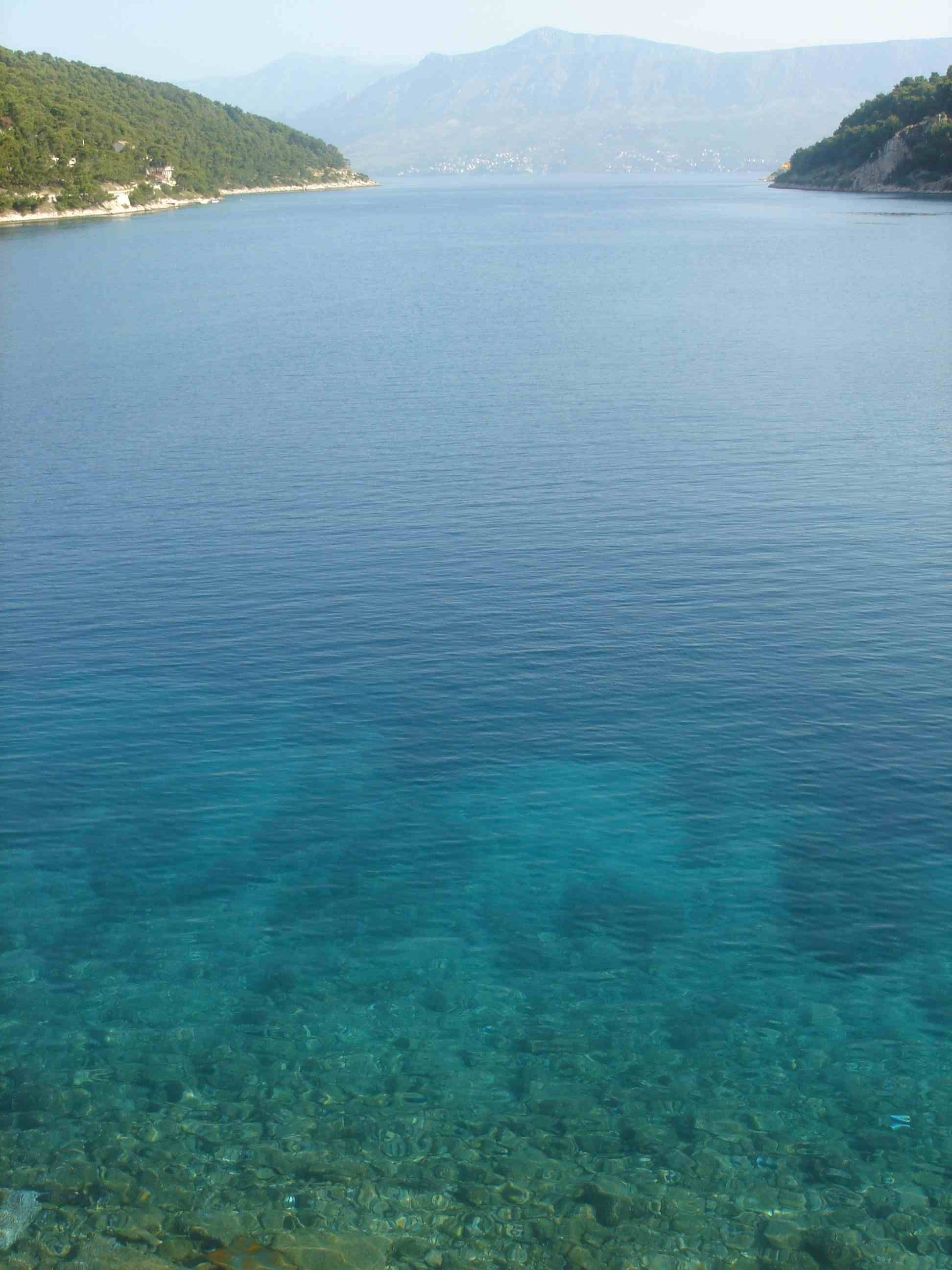
The view out of the bay of Pučišća towards the mainland.

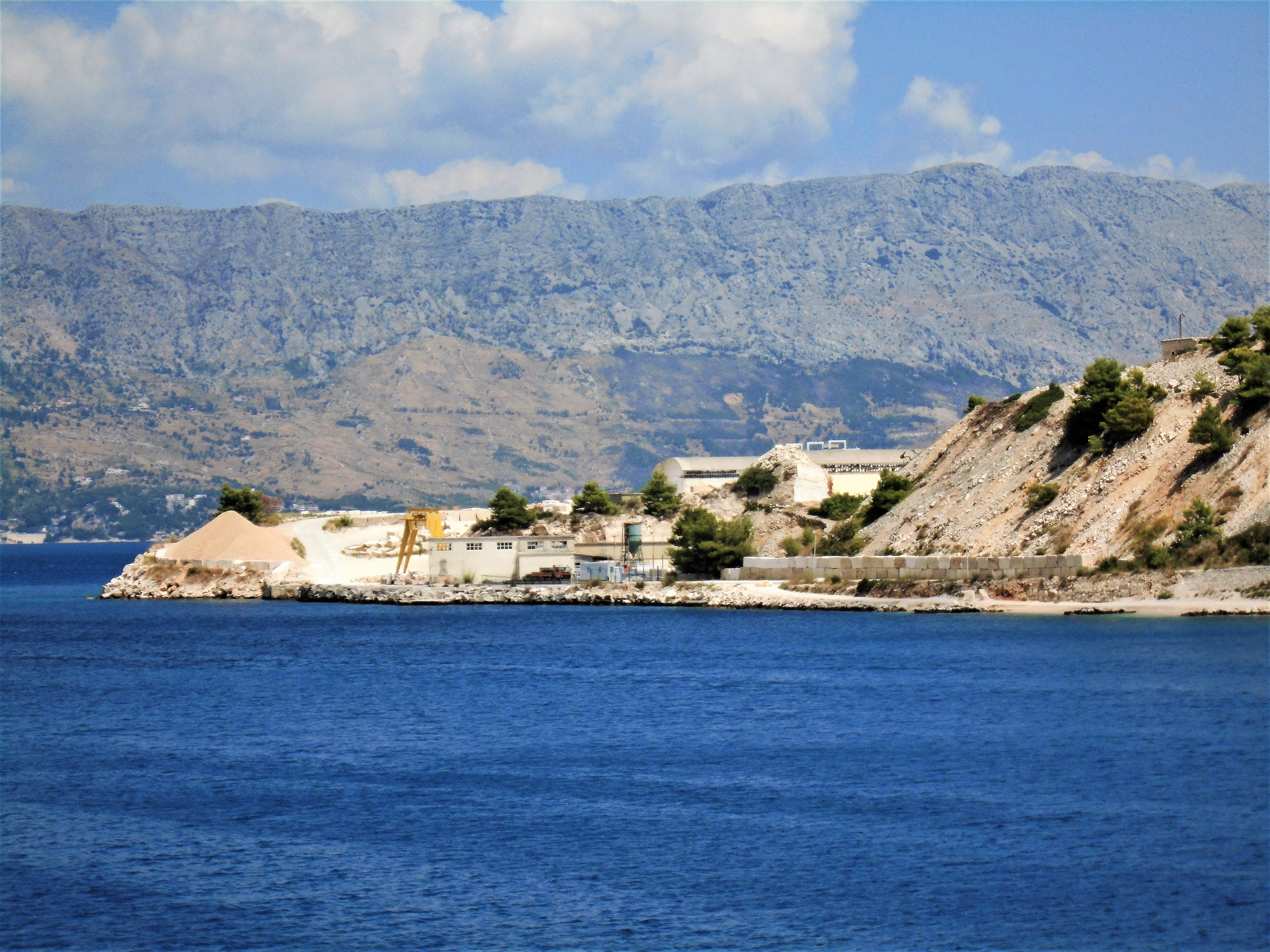
The Pučišća quarry from the west

== Literature ==
- Barilla, Robert (2022). "Pučišća". Otok Brač — Negdje između mora i zvijezda [Island Brač — Somewhere between the sea and the stars] (in Croatian). Supetar: Zaklada Otok Brač. pp. 852–911. ISBN 978-953-8395-00-0.
- Šimunović, Petar (1997). "Pučišća". Brač — Führer über die Insel [Brač - Guide to the island] (in German). Zagreb: Golden Marketing. pp. 126–132. ISBN 953-6168-32-4.
- Vlahović, Darko (2007). "Pučišća". Otok Brač - Jadranska arkadija [Island Brač - Adriatic arcadia] (in Croatian). Split: Netgen. pp. 34–36. ISBN 978-953-7525-00-2.
- Vrandečić, Josip, ed. (2016). Spomenica župe sv. Jeronima Pučišća povodom 450 godina utemljenja (1566.-2016.) [Memorial of the parish of Saint Jerome, Pučišća, on the occasion of 450 years since its establishment (1566-2016)] (in Croatian). Pučišća: Župa sv. Jeronima. ISBN 978-953-59156-0-7.
