= Štambuk =

Štambuk is a surname. The Croatian census of 2011 listed it as one of the most common surnames in Selca, Brač.

Notable people with the surname include:

- Drago Štambuk, a Croatian physician, writer, and diplomat
- Slobodan Štambuk, a Croatian Roman Catholic bishop

== See also ==
- Koko Stambuk
