= Bezmalinović =

Bezmalinović is a surname. The Croatian census of 2011 listed it as one of the most common surnames in Nerežišća and Selca, Brač.

Notable people with the surname include:

- Celestin Bezmalinović (1912–1994), Croatian Dominican bishop
- Mislav Bezmalinović, a Croatian water polo player
- Nick Bez, formerly Nikola Bezmalinović, American aviator, fisherman, and industrialist
