= Slobodan Štambuk =

Croatian Roman Catholic bishop (1941–2023)

His Excellency Slobodan Štambuk
- Bishop Emeritus of Hvar-Brač-Vis
- Metropolis: Split-Makarska
- Appointed: 30 March 1989
- Term ended: 9 March 2018
- Predecessor: Celestin Bezmalinović
- Successor: Petar Palić

Orders
- Ordination: 3 July 1966
- Consecration: 30 April 1989 by Gabriel Montalvo Higuera

Personal details
- Born: 1 March 1941 Selca, Brač, Yugoslavia
- Died: 27 September 2023 (aged 82) Split, Croatia

Slobodan Štambuk (1 March 1941 – 27 September 2023) was a Croatian bishop of the Roman Catholic diocese Hvar.

== Biography ==
Slobodan Štambuk was born in Selca on Brač and was ordained on 3 July 1966, in Selca after studying theology in Zadar. 1966 to 1968 he worked in Gornji Humac and Pražnica, before he moved to Hvar. In 1978 he returned to Brač and was a priest in Nerežišća until 1981, and then in Supetar and Škrip until 1989. From 1979 to 1989 he was the editor of the church newspaper Bračka Crkva (The Church of Brač). Štambuk was consecrated as the Bishop of Hvar on 30 March 1989 by archbishop Gabriel Montalvo Higuera. In March 2018, he retired from this position due to age. Štambuk died in Split on 27 September 2023, at the age of 82.

Catholic Church titles
Preceded by Celestin Bezmalinović	Bishop of Hvar-Brač-Vis; 1989–2018	Succeeded by Petar Palić
