= Hughes Airwest =

Airline of the United States (1968–1980)

Hughes Air Corporation
IATA	ICAO	Call sign
RW	—	HUGHES-AIR
- Founded: April 17, 1968 (amalgamation; as Air West)
- Commenced operations: 1970 (as Hughes Airwest)
- Ceased operations: October 1, 1980 (acquired by Republic Airlines)
- Hubs: San Francisco
- Focus cities: Boise; Denver–Stapleton; Las Vegas; Los Angeles; Phoenix–Sky Harbor; Portland (OR); Salt Lake City; Seattle–Boeing; Seattle/Tacoma
- Headquarters: San Mateo County, California, United States
- Key people: Nick Bez; Howard Hughes (owner); Russell V. Stephenson (president)

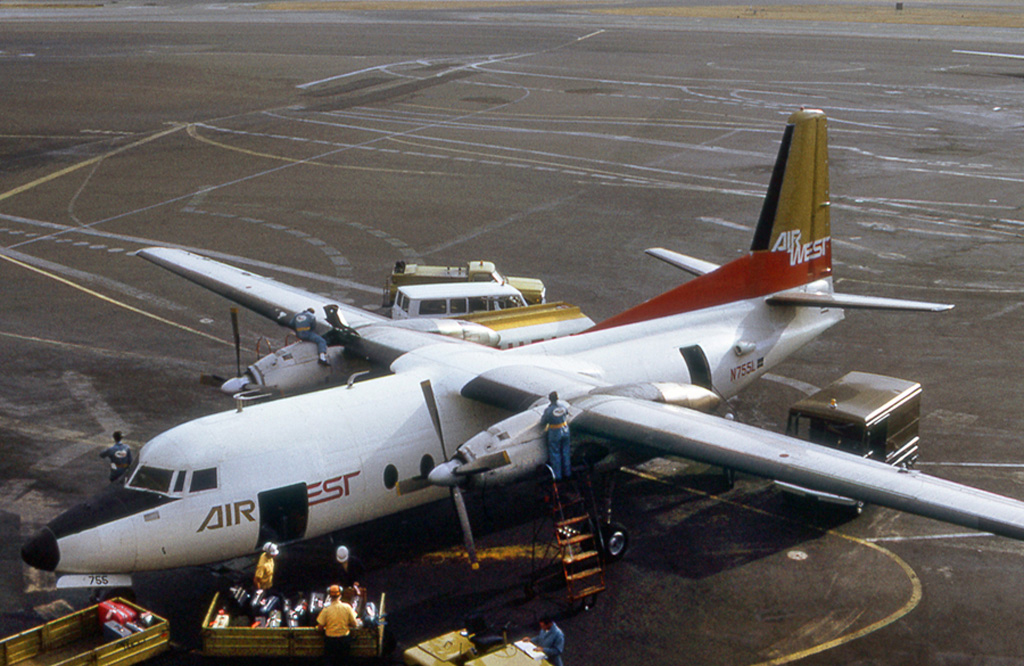
Air West Fairchild F-27A in 1970 at San Francisco International Airport

Hughes Airwest was a local service carrier, a scheduled airline in the Western United States from 1970 to 1980. It was backed by Howard Hughes' Summa Corporation. Its original name in 1968 was Air West and the air carrier was owned by Nick Bez. Hughes Airwest flew routes in the western U.S. and to several destinations in Mexico and Canada; its headquarters were on the grounds of San Francisco International Airport (SFO) in unincorporated San Mateo County, California.

With distinctive all-yellow aircraft, the company slogan was Top Banana in the West; Hughes Airwest was purchased by Republic Airlines in 1980, which in turn was merged into Northwest Airlines in 1986. Northwest Airlines was then merged into Delta Air Lines in 2010.

== History ==
On April 17, 1968, three earlier local service carriers in the western U.S. merged to form Air West:

- Pacific Air Lines, which previously operated as Southwest Airways when it was founded in 1941, was based in San Francisco, flew along the coast and California's Central Valley, linking cities from Medford, Oregon, to southern California. Pacific operated Boeing 727-100s and Fairchild F-27s in 1968.
- Bonanza Air Lines routes reached west from its Phoenix base to southern California and north to Las Vegas, Reno, and Salt Lake City. Bonanza flew Douglas DC-9-10s and Fairchild F-27s in 1968, with a DC-9-30 on order, delivered after the merger.
- West Coast Airlines, based at Boeing Field in Seattle, served the Pacific Northwest, Idaho, Utah, Montana, and northern California. West Coast operated DC-9-10s, F-27s, and Piper Navajos in 1968.

The initial Air West fleet included Boeing 727-100s, Douglas DC-9s, Fairchild F-27s, and Piper Navajos. The first new addition to the Air West fleet was a McDonnell Douglas DC-9-30, which had been ordered by Bonanza Air Lines.

Hungry for another adventure in the airline industry, TWA's former owner Howard Hughes sought the airline in 1968, and the US$90 million deal was finalized in April 1970. Renamed Hughes Air West, its call sign became "Hughes Air," and the airline expanded to several cities in the western United States, Canada, and Mexico. With the new yellow paint scheme, unveiled in September 1971, the airline began calling itself Hughes Airwest, two words instead of the initial three.

The airline participated in some movies in the 1970s, notably The Gauntlet with Clint Eastwood and Sondra Locke in 1977. Eastwood's character arrives in Las Vegas from Phoenix on the airline and when he phones the airport for flight departure times, Locke's character sarcastically called the airline, "Air Worst." Also in 1977, the airline was operating service from both Burbank (BUR) and Orange County (SNA) to Denver (DEN) via an interchange flight agreement with the original Frontier Airlines. Hughes Airwest soon introduced its own jet service to Denver from a number of locations.

Like other local service airlines in the 1970s, Hughes Airwest eliminated many stops and opened longer routes. Service expanded to resorts in Mexico; domestic routes didn't reach east of Utah and Arizona until Denver, Des Moines, Milwaukee, and Houston Hobby Airport were added in 1978. When it ended F-27 turboprop flights in 1979, Hughes Airwest became an all-jet airline with 727-200s, DC-9-10s, and DC-9-30s.

In September 1979, the airline was grounded for two months by a walkout by their ticket agents, reservations handlers, and office employees, who had been without a contract for over a year. During 1979, several airlines showed interest in buying Hughes Airwest, including Alaska and Allegheny, with the latter soon becoming USAir. The strike was resolved in late October and flights resumed in November. Four months later they were the target of a buyout by Republic Airlines, which was finalized on October 1, 1980, for $38.5 million. Minneapolis-based Republic had formed in July 1979 via the merger of North Central Airlines and Southern Airways, the first under airline deregulation.

Republic was acquired by Northwest Airlines in 1986, which merged into Delta Air Lines in 2010.

Revenue Passenger-Miles (Millions)(Sched Service Only)
	Pacific/RW	Bonanza	West Coast	Empire
1951	26	7	11	9
1955	47	23	35	(merged WC)
1960	103	64	93	
1965	138	170	122	
1970	893	(merged 1968)		
1975	1497			

== Corporate affairs ==
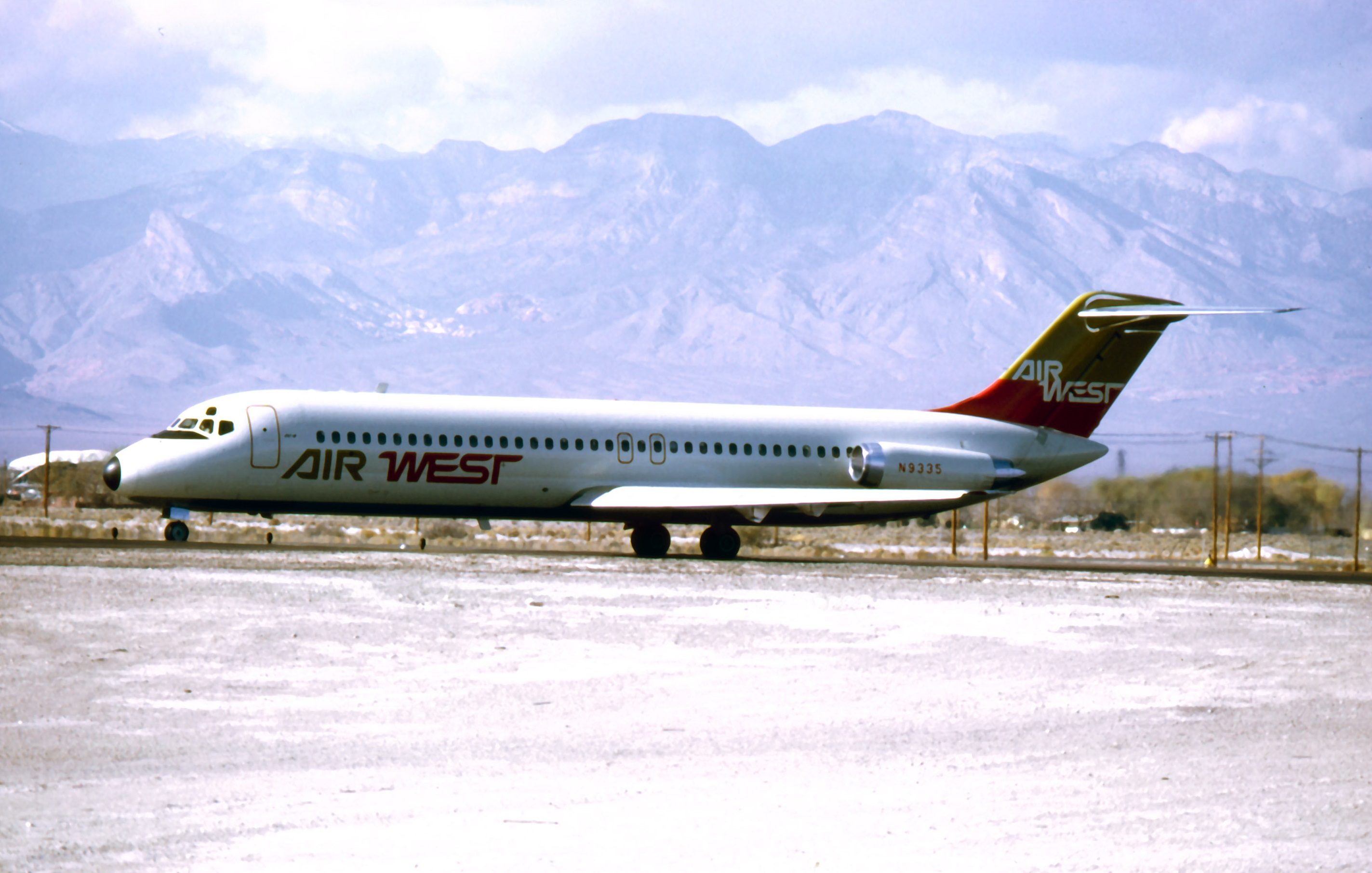
The Air West color scheme prior to conversion to Sundance Yellow and Universal Blue

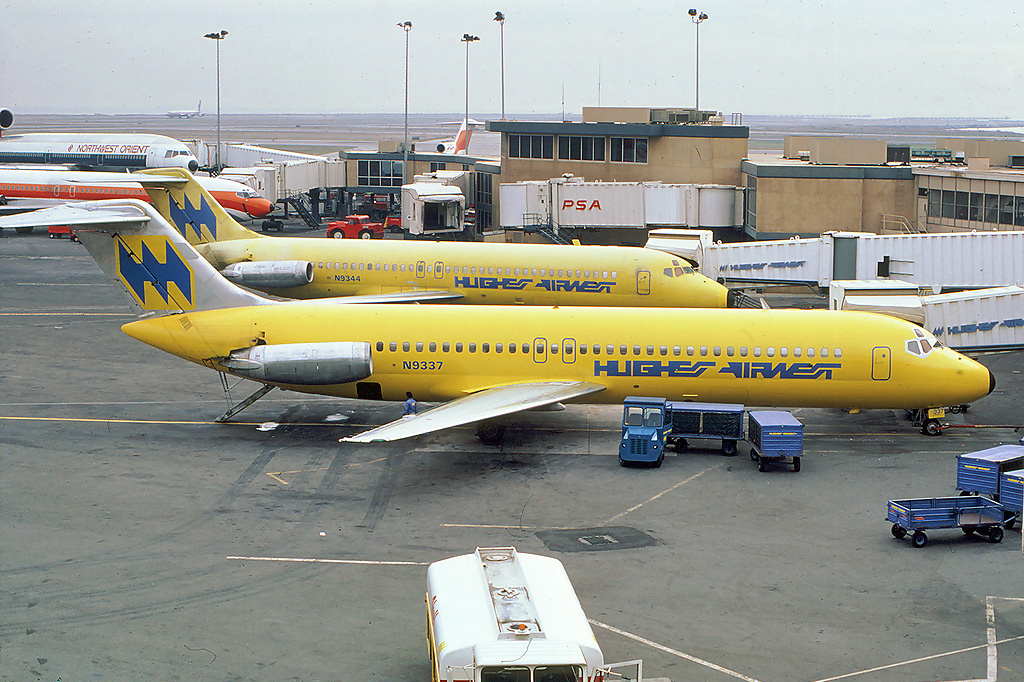
Hughes Airwest DC-9s in 1979

The original headquarters were in two buildings in downtown San Mateo, California, on the San Francisco peninsula.

Its new headquarters were located in San Mateo. The airline scheduled the move to a new headquarters in late August 1973; the complex was on a hill overlooking San Mateo and San Francisco Bay. The airline relocated two departments from the offices at San Francisco International Airport: flight control and reservations.

=== Livery ===
Hughes Airwest's planes were recognizable by their banana-yellow fuselage and tail colors. Their airplanes were often dubbed "flying bananas" and the airline launched an advertising campaign with the catchphrase "Top Banana in the West." Most nicknames given to Hughes Airwest airplanes in aviation books and magazines have to do with bananas. Apart from their all-yellow scheme, the airplanes also featured a blue logo on the vertical stabilizer (tail) that resembled three diamonds connected (possibly a reference to the initials of Howard Hughes). The name Hughes Airwest, in stylized lettering, was featured unconventionally below the front passenger windows.

This livery was devised by the southern California design firm of Mario Armond Zamparelli, following the crash of Flight 706 in June 1971, caused by a mid-air collision with a U.S. Marine Corps F-4B jet fighter near Duarte, California. In late 1971, the company launched a new marketing campaign which included new colors and repainted planes. The cabin windows also had a metallized PET film coating originally, but this proved too costly to maintain. Zamparelli also designed the uniforms of the flight attendants in the new colors, primarily in Sundance Yellow trimmed with Universe Blue.

After the sale in October 1980 the all-yellow paint scheme was gradually replaced by Republic's white with blue and green trim. Aircraft tails bore Republic's flying mallard, "Herman the Duck."

== Fleet ==
Air West and Hughes Airwest operated the following aircraft types at various times during their existence:

Hughes Airwest fleet
Aircraft	Total	Introduced	Retired	Notes
Boeing 727-193	3	1968	1972	
Boeing 727-200	11	1976	1980	
Douglas C-47A Skytrain	7	1968	1969	
McDonnell Douglas DC-9-14	5	1970	1980	
McDonnell Douglas DC-9-15RC	12	1973	1980	
McDonnell Douglas DC-9-31	30	1970	1980	
McDonnell Douglas DC-9-32	2	1971	1980	
Fairchild F-27	34	1968	1980	
Piper PA-31 Navajo	4	1968	1970	

== Destinations ==
=== Air West in July 1968 ===
This is a list of destinations taken from the Air West system timetable dated July 1, 1968, when the merger to form Air West became effective. Cities served with jets are noted in bold. Air West was operating Boeing 727-100, Douglas DC-9-10, and McDonnell Douglas DC-9-30 jets, as well as Fairchild F-27 turboprops and small Piper Navajo twin props at this time. The majority of the destinations on this list that did not have jet service were served with Fairchild F-27 twin turboprops.

ARIZONA:

- Grand Canyon (GCN)
- Kingman (IGM)
- Page (PGA)
- **Phoenix** (PHX): Phoenix Sky Harbor International Airport - **Hub**
- Prescott (PRC)
- **Tucson** (TUS)
- Yuma (YUM)

CALIFORNIA:

- Bakersfield (BFL)
- Blythe (BLH)
- **Burbank** (BUR): Bob Hope Airport
- Chico (CIC)
- Crescent City (CEC)
- El Centro (IPL)
- **Eureka/Arcata** (ACV)
- **Fresno** (FAT)
- Inyokern (IYK)
- Lake Tahoe (TVL)
- Long Beach (LGB): Long Beach Airport
- **Los Angeles** (LAX): Los Angeles International Airport - **Hub**
- Marysville/Yuba City (MYV)
- **Monterey** (MRY)
- Oakland (OAK): Oakland International Airport
- Ontario (ONT): Ontario International Airport
- Oxnard/Ventura (OXR)
- Palmdale/Lancaster (WJF)
- Palm Springs (PSP)
- Paso Robles/San Luis Obispo (PRB)
- Redding/Red Bluff (RDD)
- Riverside (RAL)
- Sacramento (SMF)
- **San Diego** (SAN): Lindbergh Field
- **San Francisco** (SFO): San Francisco International Airport - **Hub** & **airline headquarters**
- **San Jose** (SJC): Norman Y. Mineta San Jose International Airport
- **Santa Ana** aka Orange County (SNA): John Wayne Airport
- **Santa Barbara** (SBA): Santa Barbara Municipal Airport
- Santa Maria (SMX)
- Santa Rosa (STS)
- Stockton (SCK)
- Vandenberg Air Force Base (VBG)

IDAHO:

- **Boise** (BOI) - **Hub**
- Burley/Rupert (BYI)
- Idaho Falls (IDA)
- Lewiston (LWS)
- Pocatello (PIH)
- Twin Falls (TWF)
- Sun Valley/Hailey/Ketchum (SUN)

MONTANA:

- Great Falls (GTF)
- Kalispell (FCA)

NEVADA:

- **Las Vegas** (LAS): McCarran International Airport - **Hub**
- **Reno** (RNO)

OREGON:

- Albany/Corvallis (CVO)
- Astoria/Seaside (AST)
- Baker (BKE)
- **Eugene** (EUG)
- Klamath Falls (LMT)
- **Medford** (MFR)
- North Bend/Coos Bay (OTH)
- Ontario (ONO)
- **Portland** (PDX): Portland International Airport - **Hub**
- Redmond/Bend (RDM)
- Roseburg (RBG)

UTAH:

- Cedar City (CDC)
- **Salt Lake City** (SLC): Salt Lake City International Airport - **Hub**

WASHINGTON:

- Aberdeen/Hoquiam (HQM)
- Ephrata/Moses Lake (EPH)
- Olympia (OLH)
- **Pasco/Kennewick/Richland** (PSC)
- Pullman (PUW)
- **Seattle** (SEA): Seattle-Tacoma Airport - **Hub**
- **Spokane** (GEG)
- Tacoma (TIW)
- Walla Walla (ALW)
- Wenatchee (EAT)
- **Yakima** (YKM)

CANADA:

- Calgary, Alberta (YYC): Calgary International Airport

MEXICO:

- **La Paz** (LAP)
- **Mazatlan** (MZT)
- **Puerto Vallarta** (PVR)
- **Guadalajara** (GDL)
- **Guaymas** (GYM)

=== Hughes Airwest in September 1980 ===
In 1980, Hughes Airwest was an all-jet airline operating Boeing 727-200, Douglas DC-9-10, and McDonnell Douglas DC-9-30 aircraft. The timetable for September 1 lists service to:

ARIZONA:

- Grand Canyon (GCN)
- **Phoenix** (PHX): Phoenix Sky Harbor International Airport - **Hub**
- Tucson (TUS)

CALIFORNIA:

- Burbank (BUR): Bob Hope Airport
- Eureka/Arcata
- Fresno
- **Los Angeles** (LAX): Los Angeles International Airport - **Hub**
- Oakland (OAK): Oakland International Airport
- Ontario (ONT): Ontario International Airport
- Palm Springs
- Redding/Red Bluff
- Sacramento
- San Diego (SAN): Lindbergh Field
- **San Francisco** (SFO): San Francisco International Airport - **Hub** & **airline headquarters**
- San Jose (SJC): Norman Y. Mineta San Jose International Airport
- Santa Ana aka Orange County (SNA): John Wayne Airport

COLORADO:

- Denver (DEN): Stapleton International Airport

IDAHO:

- **Boise** (BOI) - **Hub**
- Idaho Falls
- Lewiston
- Pocatello
- Twin Falls

IOWA:

- Des Moines

MONTANA:

- Kalispell

NEVADA:

- **Las Vegas** (LAS): McCarran International Airport - **Hub**
- Reno

OREGON:

- Eugene
- Klamath Falls
- Portland (PDX): Portland International Airport
- Redmond/Bend

TEXAS:

- Houston (HOU): William P. Hobby Airport

UTAH:

- **Salt Lake City** (SLC): Salt Lake City International Airport - **Hub**

WASHINGTON:

- Pasco/Kennewick/Richland (Tri-Cities Airport)
- **Seattle** (SEA): Seattle-Tacoma International Airport - **Hub**
- Spokane
- Yakima

WISCONSIN:

- Milwaukee

CANADA:

- Calgary, Alberta (YYC): Calgary International Airport
- Edmonton, Alberta (YEG): Edmonton International Airport

MEXICO:

- Manzanillo
- Mazatlan
- Puerto Vallarta

== Accidents and incidents ==
=== 1971 – Flight 706 ===
On the evening of Sunday, June 6, 1971, Flight 706, a Douglas DC-9-31 collided in mid-air with a U.S. Marine Corps F-4B fighter over southern California near Duarte. All 49 on the airliner and the F-4 pilot were killed; the sole survivor was the F-4 radar intercept officer. Flight 706 had departed Los Angeles for Seattle, with five intermediate stops, the first in Salt Lake City.

=== 1972 – Flight 800 hijacking ===
Two months after the hijacking by D. B. Cooper of Northwest Orient flight 305, Hughes Airwest was the target of a copycat hijacker in early 1972. After boarding Flight 800 at McCarran airport in Las Vegas in late morning on Thursday, January 20, 23-year-old Richard Charles LaPoint claimed he had a bomb while the plane was on the taxiway and demanded $50,000 cash, two parachutes, and a helmet. When these demands were met, 51 Reno-bound passengers and two flight attendants were released; the DC-9 departed eastward toward Denver, followed by two F-111 aircraft of the U.S. Air Force from nearby Nellis AFB. The parachutes were high-visibility and equipped with emergency locator devices.

Without a coat and in cowboy boots, the hijacker bailed out from the lower aft door over the treeless plains of northeastern Colorado in mid-afternoon. LaPoint was apprehended a few hours later, with minor injuries and very cold. The plane, with two pilots and a flight attendant on board, landed safely at Denver's Stapleton airport at 2:55 p.m. MST. Facing potential death penalty charges for air piracy, the Vietnam veteran and former U.S. Army paratrooper was sentenced to forty years, but served less than eight, and was released from a halfway house in 1979; he died at age 60 in his native New Hampshire in 2008.

== See also ==
- List of defunct airlines of the United States
