= Vrandečić =

Vrandečić (also spelled Vrandecic) is a Croatian surname. The name is known only to originate from Pučišća on the island of Brač. The oldest mention of the name is from 1674, indicating that the family settled here as refugees from the War of Candia. The meaning of the name Vrandečić is unclear. The most likely explanation is that it comes from the first name Vrandeka, Vrane, Frane (but the change from an F to a V is unusual).

According to the 2021 Croatian census, there were 172 people in Croatia with this last name.

People with the name include:

- Denny Vrandečić (born 1978), Croatian-American computer scientist
- Ivo Vrandečić, (1927—2025), Croatian politician and businessman, former president of the Federal Assembly of Yugoslavia and director of Jadranbrod
- Vesna Vrandečić, Croatian singer, member of the band Xenia
