= Novo Selo, Brač =

Novo Selo
- Village
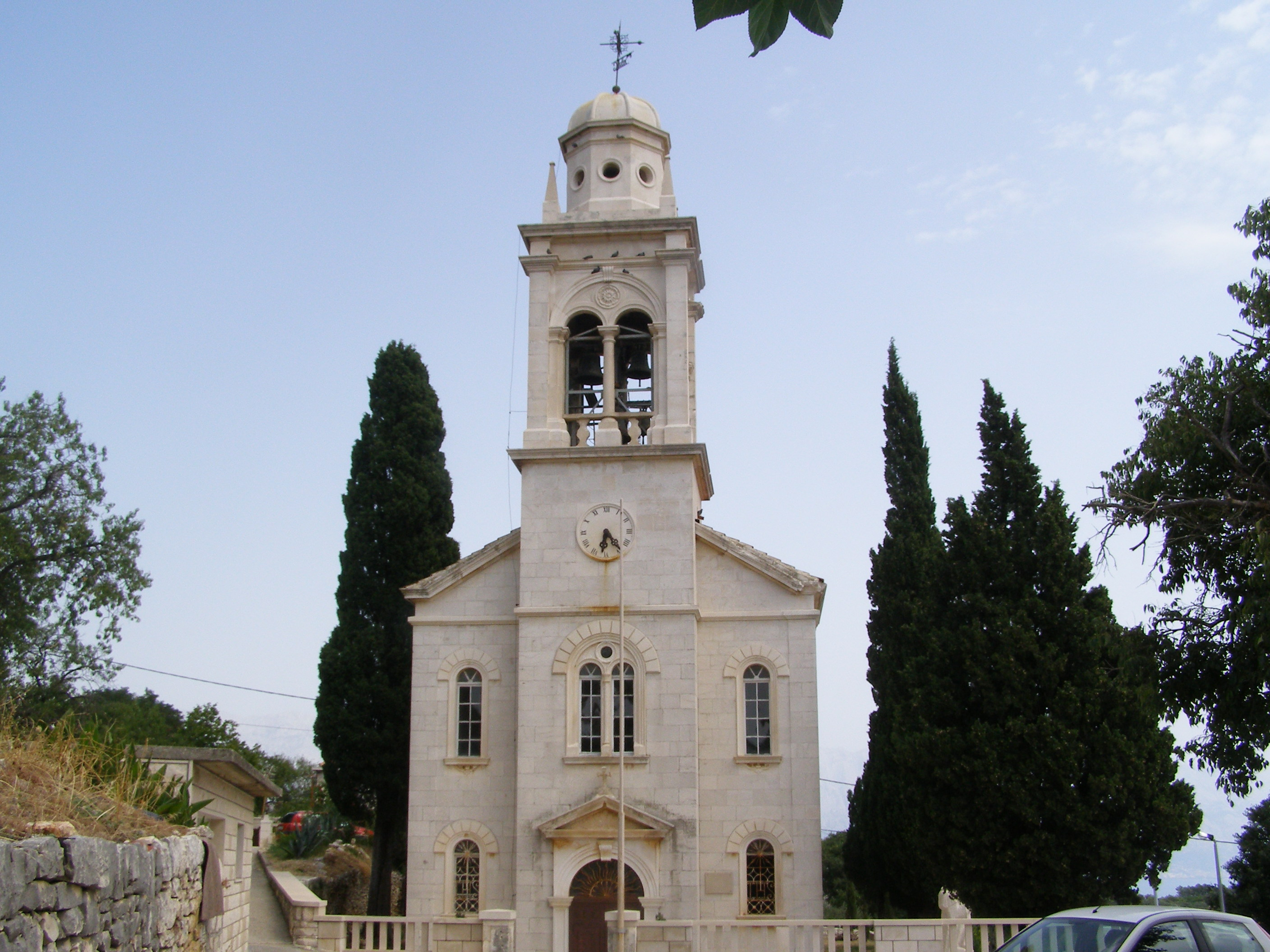

- Location within Croatia
- Coordinates: 43°21′N 16°36′E
- Country: Croatia
- County: Split-Dalmatia County
- Municipality: Selca

Area
  - Total: 12.0 km^{2} (4.6 sq mi)

Population (2021)
  - Total: 109
  - Density: 9.08/km^{2} (23.5/sq mi)
- Time zone: UTC+1 (CET)
  - Summer (DST): UTC+2 (CEST)

Novo Selo is a village on the island of Brač in Croatia. It is administered as part of the municipality of Selca. The etymology of the village comes from Slavic languages meaning new village, Novo Selo.
