= Selca, Brač =

Municipality in Split-Dalmatia county, Croatia

Selca
- Municipality
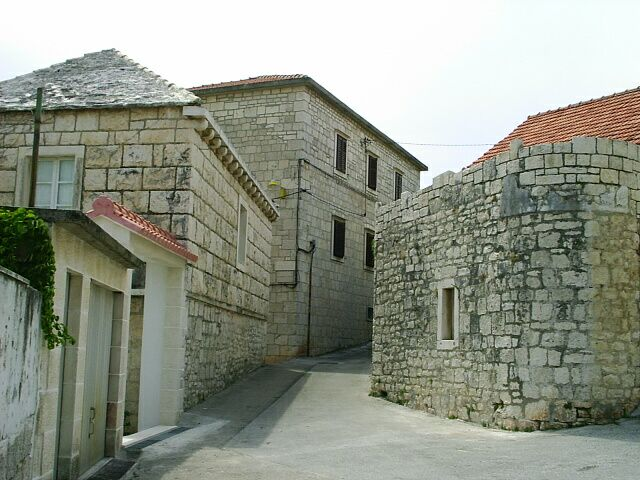

- Location within Croatia
- Coordinates: 43.295°N 16.847°E
- Country: Croatia
- Region: Dalmatia
- County: Split-Dalmatia County
- Founded: 1184

Government
  - Body: Municipality of Selca
  - Mayor: Ivan Marijančević

Area
  - Municipality: 53.8 km^{2} (20.8 sq mi)
  - Urban: 24.8 km^{2} (9.6 sq mi)
- Elevation: 571 m (1,873 ft)

Population (2021)
  - Municipality: 1,613
  - Density: 30.0/km^{2} (77.7/sq mi)
  - Urban: 692
  - Urban density: 27.9/km^{2} (72.3/sq mi)
- Postal code: 21425
- Area code: +385 (HR) + 21 (Selca)
- Patron saints: Gospa od Karmela
- Website: selca.hr

Selca is a municipality on the island of Brač in Croatia in the Split-Dalmatia County. It has a population of 1,804 (2011 census), 97.17% of which are Croats. Towns included in the municipality are: Selca, Sumartin, Povlja, and Novo Selo, which are home to numerous historical sites of various importance, such as the Parish Church in Selca, which later came to be known as the "Cathedral of Brač"; the 18th century church in Povlja, where the Charter of Povlja was found; as well as the 10th century Church of Nikola located in Sumartin.

== Geography ==
Selca is located on the hills of Pliša, on the east side of the Island of Brač.

== Demographics ==
In 2021, the municipality had 1,613 residents in the following settlements:

- Novo Selo, population 109
- Povlja, population 335
- Selca, population 692
- Sumartin, population 477
Selca: Population trends 1857–2021
v

| population | 1736 | 2144 | 2512 | 3161 | 3951 | 4004 | 3515 | 3153 | 2765 | 2778 | 2600 | 2312 | 2221 | 2333 | 1977 | 1804 | 1613 |
| | 1857 | 1869 | 1880 | 1890 | 1900 | 1910 | 1921 | 1931 | 1948 | 1953 | 1961 | 1971 | 1981 | 1991 | 2001 | 2011 | 2021 |

Sources: Croatian Bureau of Statistics publications

The majority of population are Croats, who made up 97.17% of the total population in 2011. The most practiced religion is Catholicism.

== History ==
Selca is first mentioned in the Charter of Povlja in 1184.

As an agricultural settlement, Selca began its existence as a small part of the parish (the smallest administrative unit within the Christian Church) of Gornji Humac. Thanks to stone masonry, the settlement later began to evolve rapidly, which then led to an administrative reorganisation that made Selca its own parish in 1815. Local demographics statistics show a boom in the numbers of inhabitants, going from a population of 124 in 1678 to a population of 400 in 1763. The small church which could take only 20 people was then expanded, as did the village itself with newly built houses and administrative establishments. The town slowly took the form of a well-established economic center on the east side of the island of Brač. The first school on said side of the Island then opened its doors in 1859.

In 1943, shortly before the capitulation of Fascist Italy, the Italian army had burned large parts of Selca down, along with 6 other settlements on the Island of Brač, an event that left visible traces to this day. Croatia rediviva: Ča, Kaj, Što – baštinski dani, organized in 1991, commemorates the day of the attack. The festival is held annually, and every poet reads his own verses in one of the three Croatian literary idioms at the main stone-covered square of Stjepan Radić in front of numerous interested admirers of the Croatian literary word.

== Notable people ==
- Nikola Bezmalinović (Nick Bez), Croatian industrialist in the USA and American politician
- Drago Štambuk (born 1950), medic, writer, essayist, and diplomat; author and promoter of "zlatne formule hrvatskoga jezika ča-kaj-što" (The golden formula of the Croatian language ča-kaj-što); Founder of the pan-Croatian writers
- Slobodan Štambuk (1941–2023), bishop

== Monuments ==
Selca is known throughout Croatia for their monuments dedicated to important historical figures and has the biggest amount of monuments per capita. Notable examples include:

- A statue dedicated to the Russian writer Leo Tolstoy, which was the first statue dedicated to this writer, since it was put in place shortly after Tolstoy's death.
- "Park zahvalnosti" (Park of Gratitude) is a park dedicated to three historical figures that played a big part in the independence of Croatia in 1991. The park is home to three statues: Franjo Tuđman, the first president of the modern Croatian state; Hansa Dietrich Genscher, German politician and German unison architect, one of the first high-ranked politicians to recognize Croatia; and Alois Mock, Austrian politician who dedicated himself for Croatia to be recognized internationally.
- A stone plate dedicated to Martin Kukučín (real name Matej Bencúr), who spent a large part of his life in Selca, married to Perica Didolić, who worked as a medic in Selca and is considered one of the founders of modern Slovak prose.
- A bronze statue on the main square of the town dedicated to Stjepan Radić, who was an important Croatian politician, playing a big role in returning the Croatian spirit as a force in the then Kingdom of SHS. Due to a conflict of interest, he was shot by a member of the Serbian people's radical party in 1928.
- A statue dedicated to Pope John Paul II.
- In the apse of the church, there is a bronze statue symbolising the heart of Jesus, which was made from molten leftover bullets from World War II.

== Education ==
The elementary school in Selca was founded in 1859, a few decades after the first population boom. It educates students from the whole municipality of Selca from the first to eighth class and, due to a vastly declining population during World War II which made the elementary school in Povlja obsolete, is the only remaining elementary school in the municipality. The school building has its own sports hall and during the warm weather it uses the grass field in front of it as well as the football / futsal field of the local football club "Takmac" Selca. Currently, the following subjects are taught:

- Croatian language
- Mathematics
- Chemistry
- Physics
- Sports education
- English language
- History
- Biology
- Religion

== Culture ==
The "Hrvatski sastanak" society (Croatian meeting society) was founded in Selca in 1888, which was active until the beginning of the second half of the 20th century. It was then revitalized in 1988 on the 100th anniversary of its founding and now bears the official name "Hrvatski sastanak 1888". The society was brought back to life by Sinaj Bulimbašić who was the chairman for most of its modern existence. He was then replaced by Juro Štambuk "Čiča", and today it is led by the municipality's mayor, Ivan Marijančević. Under its banner are the male Klapa "Selca" and the female "Fjorin" and "Mirula" as well as a mandolin orchestra. With the renewal of "Hrvatski sastanak 1888" also came the establishment of Selca's brass band, whose chairman is former mayor Bruno Štambuk.

As part of the parish organisation, the assembly of Krista kralja (King Christ), whose establisher is named Siniša Vuković, made itself known throughout Croatia as well as Italy, France, Austria, Poland, Slovakia, and Hungary for their religious songs. They recorded a complete selection of their songs, "Ispovid'te se" (Repent), on various media, which in 2008 was produced by the Split-based record label "Verbum".

In 1991 the writer, medic, and diplomat Dr. Drago Štambuk founded the Pan-Croatian writers' manifestation "Croatia rediviva" which promotes all three main Croatian dialects: Chakavian, Kajkavian, and Shtokavian. The manifestation is held annually in summer on the main square of Selca, attracting many locals and tourists alike. It has had some well-established writers participating, such as Dragutin Tadijanović, Vesna Parun, Slavko Mihalić, Tonko Maroević, Luko Pateljak, Jakša Fiamengo, and Joško Božanić. After the poetry marathon, the founder crowns one poet with an olive wreath, who then becomes "Poeta oliveatus". A small text from this winner is then chosen, which will be cut in a stone plate and hung on the iconic "Zid od poezije" (Wall of poetry), also located on the main square.

There is also a drama group named "Mirina" that bases their plays on events that occurred in the municipality itself, bringing humor to otherwise frustrating events, sometimes in a manner of light-hearted schadenfreude. During the same period of spring, the Selca carnival takes place, which offers its visitors a corso of modified vehicles and a costume ball.

== Sports ==
The most notable sports organisation is the local football / futsal club "Takmac", its organisation taking care of numerous sports events in the municipality for a few decades.

=== Sports summer events ===
In 2013, with the help of the municipality and the mayor, Ivan Marijančević, an annual event was started under the name of "Sportsko Lito Selca" (Sports summer Selca) with the goal to promote sports in the municipality. It ended up growing bigger than its original purpose and became a major event for locals and tourists alike, bringing sport enthusiasts from all parts of the island of Brač together to compete in all the popular sports on the island, which include football, basketball, cageball, tennis, table tennis, and boccia. The sports events are also accompanied by numerous special events such as the "Old vs. young" football match on the large field, concerts that hosted well known bands, and a Football Ultras manifestation lighting flares and various other fireworks called "Pyroshow".

The events take its financial resources from the municipality and local companies that have decided to sponsor the event.

== Literature ==
- Brački zbornik br. 6, Dasen Vrsalović-Povijest otoka Brača, Skupština općine Brač, Supetar 1968.
