= Nick Bez =

American aviator, fisherman, and industrialist

- Born: Nikola Bezmalinović; 25 August 1895; Selca, Brač, Austria-Hungary (now Croatia)
- Died: 5 February 1969 (aged 73); Seattle, Washington, US
- Occupation: Entrepreneur/businessman
- Years active: 1914–1969
- Spouse: Magdalena Bezmalinović (Dorotich) (m. 1901)

Nikola Bezmalinović, known as Nick Bez (25 August 1895 – 5 February 1969), was the founder of fishing, canning, and shipping companies in Juneau, Alaska. He operated the largest fishing ship at the time, the 423 ft. Pacific Explorer. He also owned and operated the Nornek cannery, two gold mines, Alaska Southern Packing Company, Peter Pan Seafoods, Alaska Southern Airways, Pacific Exploration Company and the Intercoastal Packing Company, as well as West Coast Airlines, which became part of Air West. He became known as a "rags to riches" entrepreneur. In 1919, Nikola Bezmalinović changed his name to Nick Bez. Bez died in 1969.

== Biography ==
Nick Bez (Nikola Bezmalinović) was born on the island of Selca, Brač in the Adriatic Sea, in Croatia (then Austria-Hungary) in 1895. On September 16, 1910, at age 15, he arrived in New York City with his friend Louis G. Ursich. He worked in a restaurant and then, by train, moved to Tacoma, Washington. In Tacoma, he worked with a group of Dalmatian Italian fishermen. He then moved to Alaska and got a job on a towboat as a deckhand. He then purchased a rowboat, then a gas power boat. In 1914, he purchased a seiner fishing boat. The Alaskan cannery hired him as superintendent in 1922. He went into business for himself again and purchased an abandoned cannery on Peril Strait, near Sitka, Alaska. The Peril Strait was very successful and profitable. With these profits, in 1934, he founded Alaska Southern Airways. Bez started two more canneries in Alaska and operated two gold mines by 1936. In 1940, he founded the Alaska Southern Packing Company, later the Intercoastal Packing Company, which ran a floating cannery called La Merced, converted from a 390 ft. steamship known as the Ogontz. He later took over the Columbia River Packers Association; in 1951 he sold the Association. That same year, he purchased P. E. Harris & Campany, a large salmon-packing and distributing company. P. E. Harris & Campany was founded in 1916. Bez and his wife lived in the Mount Baker Mansion in Seattle. He died in 1969 of cancer.

== Peter Pan Seafoods ==
After buying P. E. Harris & Company in 1951, Bez renamed the firm Peter Pan Seafoods. P. E. Harris & Company was founded in 1916. P. E. Harris & Company packed salmon products: Peter Pan, Gill Netters Best, and Sea Kist. Peter Pan Seafoods had canneries in Alaska, Puget Sound, and Astoria. In 1975, Bristol Bay Native Corporation purchased the firm. In 1979, it was sold to Nichiro Gyogyo Kaisha Ltd., which in turn merged with Maruha Corporation in 2007. The Peter Pan Seafoods plant is in Dillingham, Alaska.

== SS Pacific Explorer ==
Bez purchased the ship 423-foot Pacific Explorer in 1946 from the United States and founded the Pacific Exploration Company. The United States Defense Plant Corporation, sponsored by the War Food Administration, gave a $2 million loan to the Pacific Exploration Company, part of the World War II Pacific Fishing project. The loan was to transform the 423-foot World War I ship Mormacrey into a modern fishing boat with a cannery on board. Naval architecture firm W.C. Nickum and Sons did the design work for the conversion of the ship. In doing so, it showed that the United States could be a superpower in fishing, not just Japan, which had 66% of the tuna market. Pacific Explorer would operate in international waters off Alaska, with the four small 100-foot ships that supplied fish: NOAAS Oregon, Alaska, California, and Washington, together known as the Pacific Coast Combination Ships. The Pacific Explorer's first trip was from Astoria, Oregon to South America on January 3, 1947 for tuna. The Pacific Explorer's floating cannery stayed off the Gulf of Nicoya, Costa Rica for five months, and 10 fishing ships provided 2,250 tons of tuna. The second trip of the Pacific Explorer was made on March 26, 1948 from Seattle to the Bering Sea. Nine fishing boats supplied king crab, flatfish and cod for the Pacific Explorer: the Bear, Sunbeam, Borris, Tordenskjold, Kiska, Mars, Foremost, Jeanette F and Pearl Harbor. The Pacific Explorer was in Pavlof Bay as the "cannery" (frozen) for 90 days. After the two fishing trips and the plan having been successfully implemented, the Pacific Explorer was put into a reserve fleet.

== Alaska Southern Airways ==
In 1932 Bez purchased Alaska Southern Airways. Alaska Southern Airways had routes to Seattle, Juneau, Cordova, and Ketchikan. Alaska Southern Airways was the first airline to fly into Alaska. Alaska Southern Airways operated the first Douglas DC-3 planes in Alaska. Bez ran the airline so his workers could get to his fishing boats, cannery and ships more quickly. Alaska Southern Airways Lockheed 5B Vega, named Baranof crashed in Pinta Bay, Alaska on October 10, 1934, killing one person. Alaska Southern Airways was sold to Pan Am in 1934.

== West Coast Airlines and Air West ==
In 1946 Bez purchased West Coast Airlines which was based in Seattle. According to its system timetable, in 1968 West Coast Airlines was operating Douglas DC-9-10 jets, Fairchild F-27 turboprops and Douglas DC-3 prop aircraft as well as small Piper Navajo prop aircraft with scheduled passenger service to destinations in California, Idaho, Montana, Oregon, Utah and Washington state as well as to Calgary, Alberta in Canada.

In the late 1960s, West Coast Airlines merged with Bonanza Air Lines and Pacific Air Lines to form Air West. Bez then sold Air West to Howard Hughes for 100 million dollars. Following its sale, Air West was then renamed Hughes Airwest. Hughes Airwest was subsequently acquired and merged with Republic Airlines in 1980.

== Historical marker ==
- A historical marker in Juneau, Alaska reads:

Between 1929 and 1932, passengers could fly between Juneau's waterfront and downtown Seattle on scheduled weekly flights of Alaska-Washington Consolidated Airways. The fare was $105. Juneau's harbor was home to three pioneer flying companies that offered commercial air service in the early 1930's. Alaska Southern Airways, Pacific Alaska Airways, and Panhandle Air Transport linked Juneau with outlying mines, canneries, lodges, and other communities in Southeast Alaska. Then came Alaska Air Transport and Marine Airways, which later merged to become Alaska Coastal Airlines. After Alaska Airlines purchased the local flying companies, the major carrier announced plans to discontinue regional floatplane service. Southeast Skyways was founded in 1968 to fill that gap. It handled both scheduled service and the growing seasonal interest in sightseeing flights. In the late 1970s, Southeast Skyways moved to the airport and Wings of Alaska took over the waterfront-based tourist trade.

== Nornek cannery ==
In 1918 the Northwestern Fisheries Company built a fish cannery, Nornek cannery, on the Naknek River. Nornek cannery was sold to the Pacific American Fisheries in 1935. In 1944 the Nornek cannery was sold to Intercoastal Packing Company and opened in 1947 and operated under the name Columbia River Packers Association.

== Intercoastal Packing Company ==
Intercoastal Packing Company was founded in 1940. Intercoastal Packing Company operated the ship the SS Ogontz. Intercoastal Packing Company operated ships for the World War II effort.

- Ships:
- SS Western Clipper, Seiner built in 1939, wrecked off Atka in 1964
- SS Toni B, former Navy tug USS ATR-50 built in 1943, sold to Bez in 1947, sank in February 1955, in heavy sea in Caribbean waters
- SS Ogontz

== SS Ogontz ==
Ogontz was built in 1919 by the American International Shipbuilding Corp., Hog Island, Pennsylvania, as the Scatacook, but renamed Ogontz for the United States Shipping Board. In 1925 it was operated by Tampa Interocean Lines, then the Lykes Brothers Steamship Company in 1933. The ship was sold to Nick Bez in 1938, then to Intercoastal Packing Company in 1940. On March 19, 1942, it was torpedoed and sunk by German submarine U-103 off Cuba Coast. It was a 5,753 ton cargo ship. Intercoastal Packing Company ship Ogontz was used to help the World War II effort. During World War II, Intercoastal Packing Company operated Merchant navy ships for the United States Shipping Board. During World War II, Ogontz was in charter shipping with the Maritime Commission and War Shipping Administration. The ship was run by its Intercoastal Packing Company.

== Alaska Chichogof Mining Company ==
Alaska Chichogof Mining Company mine was started by Mike McKallich in 1928 in Klag Bay Sitka, Alaska. The gold mine was purchased by Bez in 1936 and worked one year. Alaska Chichogof mine is at an elevation of 98 feet. Silver ore is also found in the mine.

== See also ==
- World War II United States Merchant Navy
- Alaska Packers' Association
