= Asthenargus =

Scientific classification
- Kingdom: Animalia
- Phylum: Arthropoda
- Subphylum: Chelicerata
- Class: Arachnida
- Order: Araneae
- Infraorder: Araneomorphae
- Family: Linyphiidae
- Genus: Asthenargus; Simon & Fage, 1922

Type species
- A. paganus (Simon, 1884)

Species
- 21, see text

Genus of spiders

Asthenargus is a genus of dwarf spiders that was first described by Eugène Louis Simon & L. Fage in 1922.

== Species ==
As of May 2019 it contains twenty-one species:

- Asthenargus adygeicus Tanasevitch, Ponomarev & Chumachenko, 2016 – Russia (Caucasus)
- Asthenargus bracianus Miller, 1938 – Central, Eastern Europe
- Asthenargus brevisetosus Miller, 1970 – Angola
- Asthenargus carpaticus Weiss, 1998 – Romania
- Asthenargus caucasicus Tanasevitch, 1987 – Caucasus (Russia, Georgia, Azerbaijan)
- Asthenargus conicus Tanasevitch, 2006 – China
- Asthenargus edentulus Tanasevitch, 1989 – Kazakhstan to China
- Asthenargus expallidus Holm, 1962 – Cameroon, Congo, Kenya, Tanzania
- Asthenargus helveticus Schenkel, 1936 – Germany, Switzerland, Italy to Poland
- Asthenargus inermis Simon & Fage, 1922 – East Africa
- Asthenargus linguatulus Miller, 1970 – Angola
- Asthenargus longispina (Simon, 1915) – Spain, France
- Asthenargus major Holm, 1962 – Kenya
- Asthenargus marginatus Holm, 1962 – Uganda
- Asthenargus matsudae Saito & Ono, 2001 – Japan
- Asthenargus myrmecophilus Miller, 1970 – Angola, Nigeria
- Asthenargus niphonius Saito & Ono, 2001 – Japan
- Asthenargus paganus (Simon, 1884) (type) – Europe, Russia (Europe to West Siberia)
- Asthenargus perforatus Schenkel, 1929 – Europe
- Asthenargus placidus (Simon, 1884) – France, Switzerland
- Asthenargus thaleri Wunderlich, 1983 – Nepal
