= Pražnica =

Coordinates: 43°19′N 16°42′E

- Village
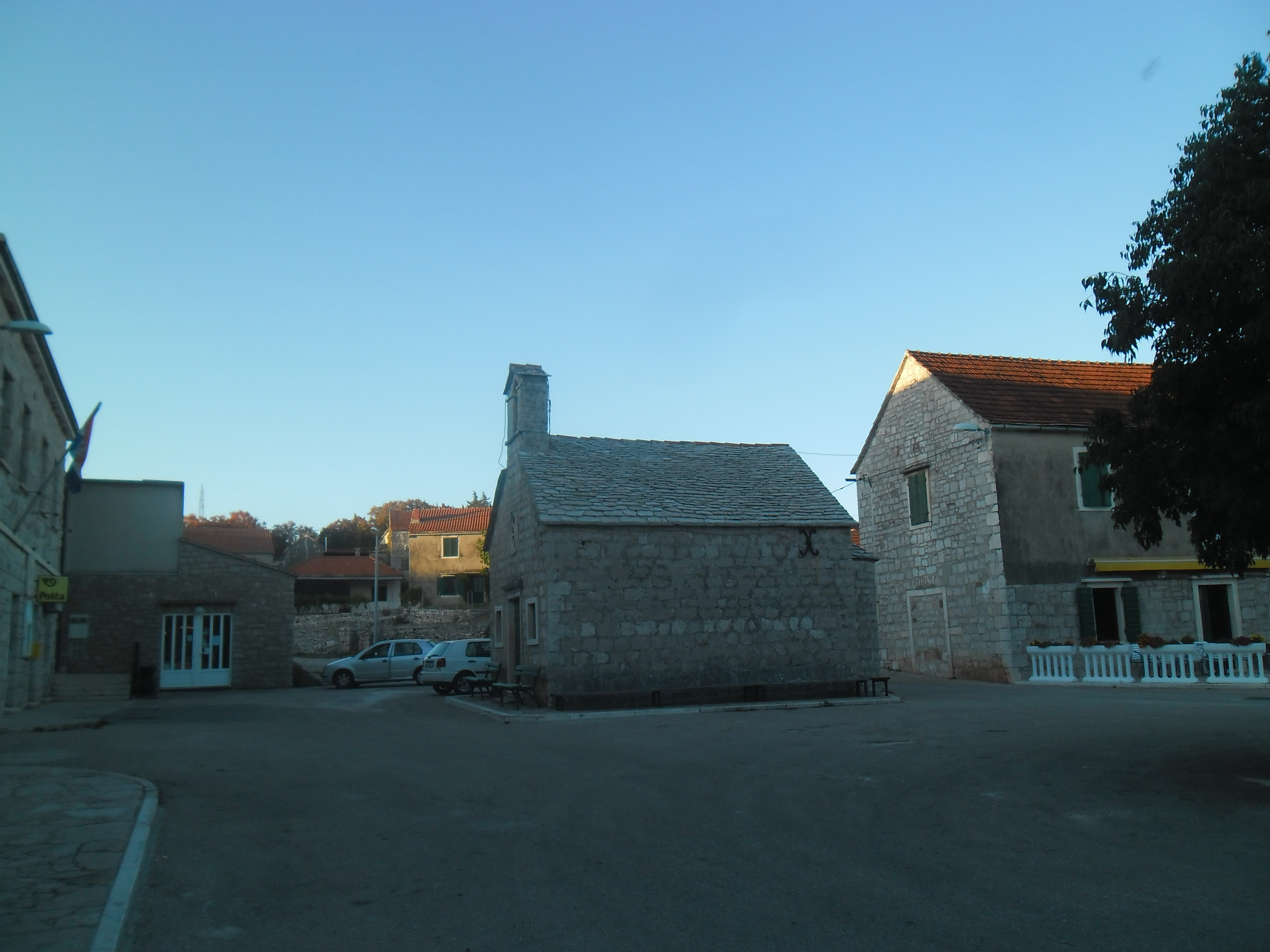
- Interactive map of Pražnica
- Country: Croatia
- County: Split-Dalmatia County
- Municipality: Pučišća

Area
  - Total: 25.9 km^{2} (10.0 sq mi)

Population (2021)
  - Total: 309
  - Density: 11.9/km^{2} (30.9/sq mi)
- Time zone: UTC+1 (CET)
  - Summer (DST): UTC+2 (CEST)

Pražnica is a village in Croatia on the island of Brač. It is connected by the D113 highway.
