= Charter of Povlja =

Legal document written in 1250 in Povlja, Croatia

The Charter of Povlja (Croatian: Povaljska listina) is a legal document written on 1 December 1250 in Povlja on the island of Brač, Croatia. It is parchment copy of an ownership document from the cartulary of the Benedictine monastery of St John the Baptist. It is one of the oldest Croatian cultural and linguistic records, which through its content provides a number of interesting insights into the various aspects of the time in which it was made. The first modern edition was published in 1881 by Franjo Rački in his book Starine (Antiquities).

It is written in the Bosnian Cyrillic script by Ivan, the canon of the Cathedral Church of Split and a Hvar notary, at the request of the Povlja abbot Ivan, and by order of the Bishop of Hvar Nikola. The template for the first part of the charter was Prince Brečko's charter from 1184, which regulated territorial relations between the estate of the monastery and the island's prince and župan. That template charter is almost entirely included within the Charter of Povlja.

The terse list of monastic estates reveal the Old Croatian tribal and clan common law procedures, and legal formulations contain recognizable vernacular and literary expressions, absent in later legal documents. Today it is kept in the parish office in Pučišća.

== Language ==
In the text of the Charter, two language layers can be seen: the common national language, which is the Chakavian dialect of Brač, its linguistic superstructure is provided by the contemporary literary language, which is Old Church Slavonic of Croatian recension, that gave the whole text a more formal feel. There are also a considerable number of words of Romance origin.

Its undifferentiated writing shows the author's knowledge of various contemporary Cyrillic schools on one side and the influence of Latin writing customs on the other. These influences reveal an important linguistic information. Namely, the unusualness of the use of graphs in the graphic series ѣ (yat), ы (yery), i and e indicates that in those region at that time there was already established an Ikavian reflex of the yat (with the possibility of some words being Ekavian).
