= Povlja =

- Village
- Povlja waterfront

- Location within Croatia
- Coordinates: 43.334°N 16.84°E
- Country: Croatia
- County: Split-Dalmatia County
- Founded: 1632

Government
  - Body: Municipality of Selca
  - Mayor: Ivan Marijančević

Area
  - Total: 10.8 km^{2} (4.2 sq mi)
- Elevation: 1 m (3.3 ft)

Population (2021)
  - Total: 335
  - Density: 31.0/km^{2} (80.3/sq mi)
- Postal code: 21413
- Area code: +385 (HR) + 21 (Selca)
- Patron saints: Sv. Ivan

Povlja (pronounced [pôːvʎa], locally Povje pronounced [pôːvje]) is a village on the island of Brač in Croatia. The village itself is located in a deep natural harbour surrounded by many other deep natural harbours, bays (Luke). Because of that it is famous for short-term and overnight docking. There are a couple of restaurants with superb local cuisine. The village is famous for its crystal clear sea and is popular for family vacation due to its calmness. It is notable for being a completely intact Mediterranean village. Many locals rent out apartments in most houses in the village. Booking is best done well ahead of planned visit due to high demand. The place features many beaches varying from stone, concrete to tiny pebble beaches.

== Geography ==
Povlja is located in a natural bay, on the east side of the Island of Brač.

== Demographics ==
The town of Povlja has a population of approximately 364 people, according to the 2011 census, the majority of which are Croats. The most practiced religion is Catholicism.

== History ==
The early Christian basilica from the 6th century in Povlja, with retracted apse, decorated with a tripartite window on the posts and the octagonal baptistery is one of the most sacred buildings of this kind in Croatia. The baptistery in the 12th century was transformed into a church which had a door in the south front wall from 1184. To the public its doorstep became known as the "Povaljski Prag". From the Benedictine monastery a monument called "The Charter of Povlja", one of the oldest and most important Croatian monuments written Croatian Cyrillic script was found - the plate hails from the year 1184, a transcript was made from it in the year 1250. In the 18th and 19th century, the church was enlarged and over the shrine a castle was built under which, according to legend, a Greek boy with great treasure was buried. Legends related to Povlja are the local woman Helena of the Cross, the mother of Emperor Constantine the Great, who was taken to Constantinople from Povlja and that of St. John of Povlja, who walked on the sea and his preaching drove away the plague.
