= Korea International Boat Show =

South Korean annual boat show

The Korea International Boat Show (KIBS) is one of the three biggest boat shows in Asia, representing the Korean marine leisure industry. The 2016 KIBS was held jointly from 19 to 22 May 2016, at KINTEX, with the associated Asia Marine Conference. Despite the Sewol ferry disaster and the rising public concern on maritime safety, many exhibitors remained confident about the Korean market's potential. The convention brought together 240 exhibitors and buyers from 40 countries, and occupied a gross exhibition area of 57,557 m^{2}. KIBS 2026 was held from 6-8 March 2026. In 2027 it will be held from 12- 14 March.

== Past shows ==
- Date: 26–28 March 2021
- Time: From 10:00 to 18:00
- Venue: KINTEX, Ilsanseo-gu, Goyang-si, Gyeonggi Province Republic of Korea
- Host: Ministry of Oceans and Fisheries, Gyeonggi Province
- Organizer: KINTEX, Korea Trade Promotion Corporation (KOTRA) Waterway+, Marina and Marine Industries Association of Korea
- Date: 03-5 March 2023
- Time: From 10:00 to 18:00
- Venue: KINTEX – Korea International Exhibition Center, Goyang, South Korea
- Host: Ministry of Oceans and Fisheries, Gyeonggi-Do
- Organizer: KINTEX, Korea Water & Environmental-Industry Corporation, Marina and Marine Industries Association of Korea
- Date: 06-08 March 2026
- Time: From 10:00 to 18:00
- Venue:KINTEX, Kintex-ro, Ilsanseo-gu, Goyang, Gyeonggi Province, Republic of Korea
- Host: Minister of Oceans and Fisheries , Gyeonggi-Do
- Organiser: KINTEX, Korea Trade Promotion Company (KOTRA), Marina and Marine Industries Association of Korea

== Past events ==
- KIBS 2018 / May 24–27 / KINTEX & Gimpo Ara Marina
- KIBS 2017 / May 25–28 / KINTEX & Gimpo Ara Marina
- KIBS 2016 / May 22–25 / KINTEX
- KIBS 2015 / May 25–28 / KINTEX
- KIBS 2014 / June 12–15 / KINTEX
- KIBS 2013 / May 30 - June 2 / KINTEX
- KIBS 2012 / May 30 - June 3 / Jeongok & Tando Port, Gyeonggi Province
- KIBS 2011 / June 8–12 / Jeongok & Tando Port, Gyeonggi Province
- KIBS 2010 / June 9–13 / Jeongok & Tando Port, Gyeonggi Province
- KIBS 2009 / June 3–7 / Jeongok & Tando Port, Gyeonggi Province
- KIBS 2008 / June 11–15 / Jeongok & Tando Port, Gyeonggi Province

== Accreditation ==
- International Endorsed Exhibition by MOTIE (Ministry of Trade, Investment and Energy), 2010
- IFBSO (International Federation of Boat Show Organizers) Platinum Member, 2011
- ICOMIA (Int'l Council of Marine Industry Associations) Member, 2012
- Trade Fair Certification by the U.S. Department of Commerce, 2014

== Exhibition profile ==
- Small and large boats and yachts
- Canoes, kayaks, rowboats, water-skis, PWCs, trailers and campers
- Marine engines, propulsion, engine parts and controllers
- Navigation, communication and electronic equipment
- Maintenance and troubleshooting solutions
- Boat and yacht interiors and exteriors
- Wakeboards and windsurf boards
- Diving equipment and services
- fishing tackle, accessories and services
- Marine apparel, books and life vests
