= Croatia Boat Show =

Coordinates: 43°30′23″N 16°26′18″E

Croatia Boat Show CBS
- Status: Active
- Genre: Boat Show
- Venue: Split city harbour
- Location: Split
- Country: Croatia
- Inaugurated: 1998
- Attendance: 37,400 (2009)
- Organizer: Vicenco Blagaić
- Website: http://www.croatiaboatshow.com/

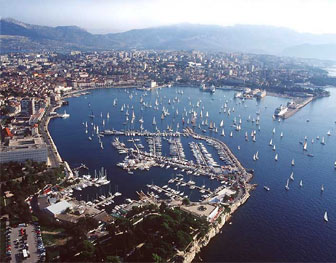
Port of Split, venue of the boat show

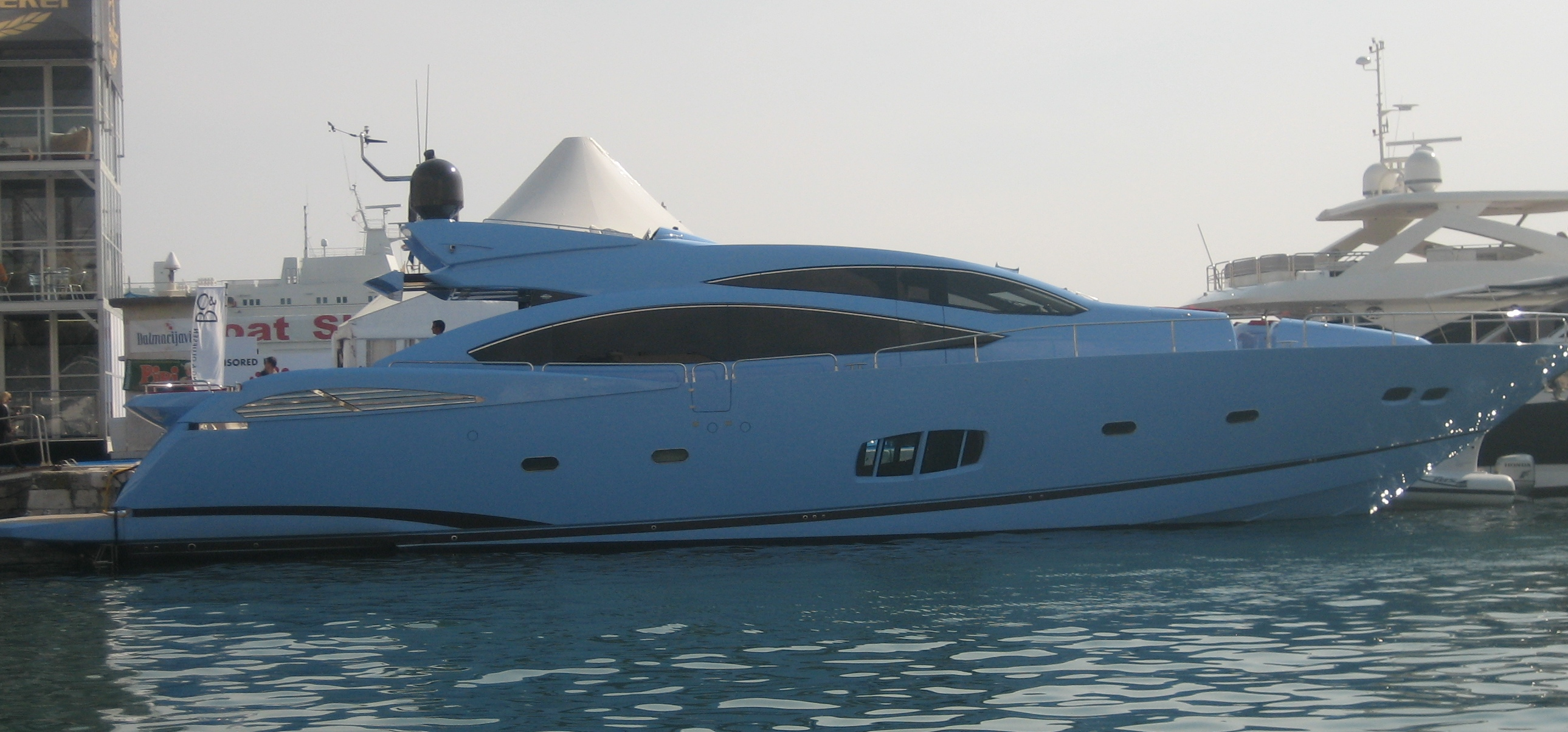
a Sunseeker motor yacht at the Croatia Boat Show

The Croatia Boat Show (CBS) is a boat show, held annually in the city of Split, Croatia, typically during the month of April. The exhibition is organised by Croatian business entrepreneur Vicenco Blagaić, and takes place at the City harbour of the Port of Split.

== See also ==
- List of sailboat designers and manufacturers
- Adriatic Boat Show
