= Tourism in Cyprus =

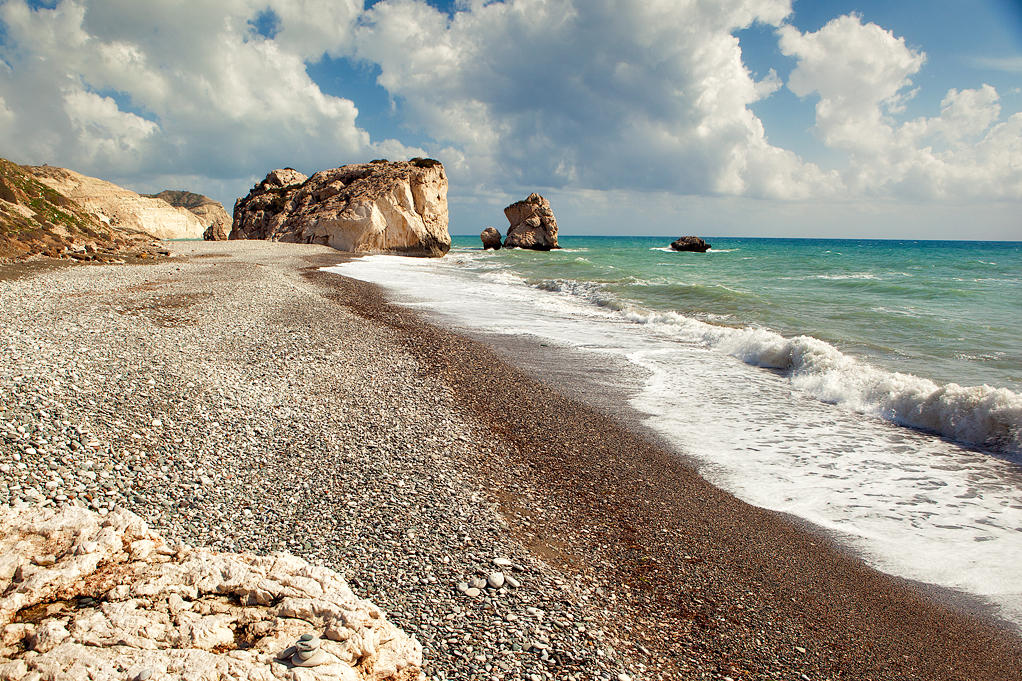
Petra tou Romiou ("Rock of the Greek") where legend says that Aphrodite, the Greek goddess of love, emerged from the sea

Tourism in Cyprus is a cornerstone of the country's economy, and has significantly impacted its culture and multicultural development throughout the years. In 2006, the tourism industry made up 10.7% of the country's GDP and the total employment in the tourism industry was estimated at 113,000 jobs. Cyprus welcomes at least around 4 million tourists on average each year,making it the 40th most popular destination in the world and the 6th most popular per capita of local population. Cyprus has been a full member of the World Tourism Organization since 1975.

== History ==
Varosha was once one of the most popular destinations in the world, once frequented by Hollywood stars, such as Elizabeth Taylor, until the Turkish Invasion of Cyprus in 1974. It is now abandoned and the majority of it is guarded by armed troops.

== Tourism Statistics ==
Yearly tourist arrivals in millions

Tourist Arrivals to Cyprus (1976–2024)
Year	Tourist Arrivals
1976	172,092
1980	348,530
1981	423,553
1982	530,600
1983	599,796
1984	665,882
1985	769,727
1986	827,937
1987	948,551
1988	1,111,818
1989	1,377,636
1990	1,561,479
1991	1,385,129
1992	1,991,000
1993	1,841,000
1994	2,069,000
1995	2,100,000
1996	1,950,000
1997	2,088,000
1998	2,222,706
1999	2,434,285
2000	2,686,205
2001	2,696,732
2002	2,418,238
2003	2,303,247
2004	2,349,012
2005	2,470,063
2006	2,400,924
2007	2,416,081
2008	2,403,750
2009	2,141,193
2010	2,172,998
2011	2,392,228
2012	2,464,908
2013	2,405,390
2014	2,441,239
2015	2,659,405
2016	3,186,531
2017	3,652,073
2018	3,938,625
2019	3,976,777
2020	631,609
2021	1,936,931
2022	3,201,080
2023	3,845,652
2024	4,040,200

=== Arrivals by country ===
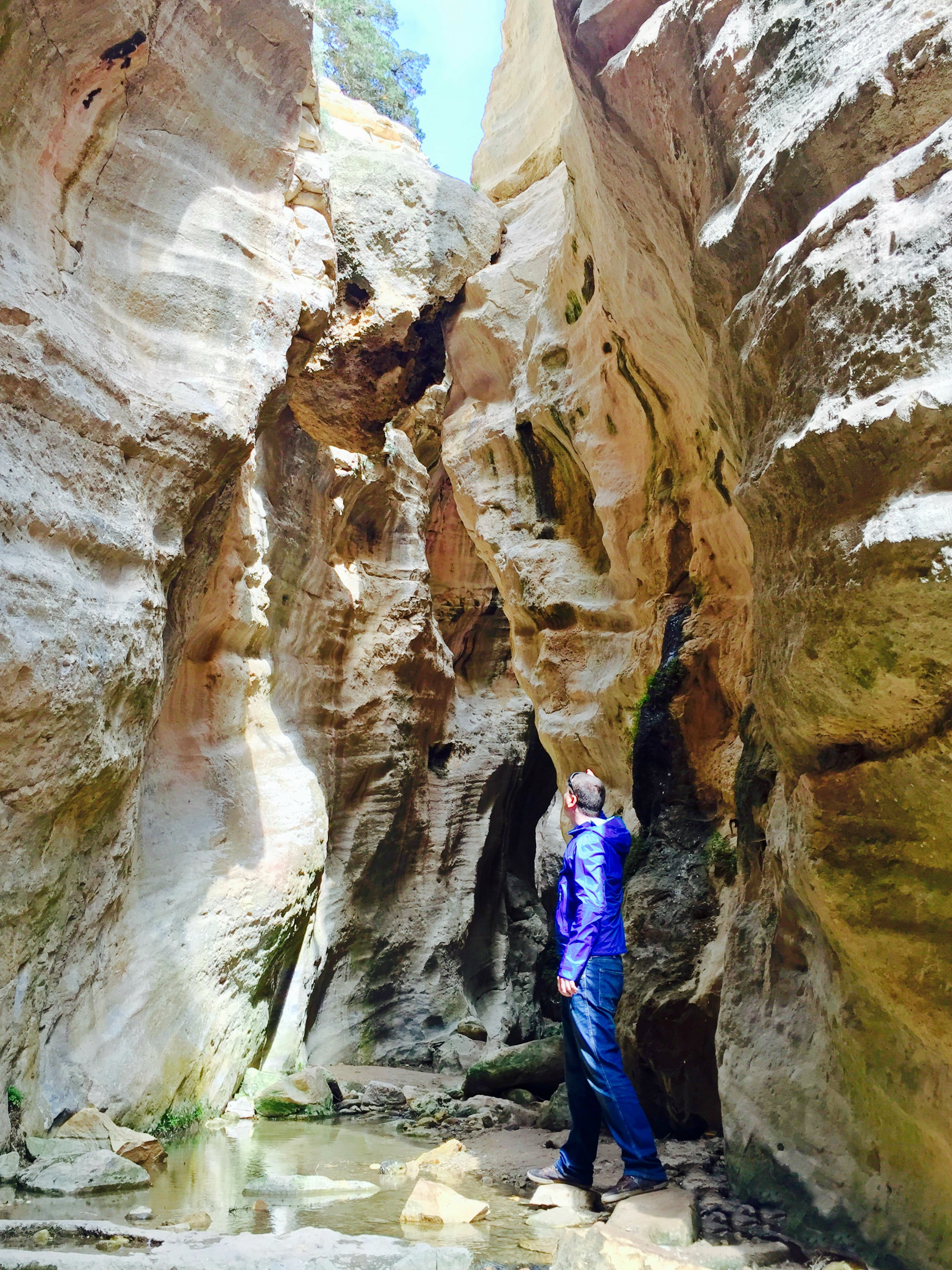
Avakas Gorge in Akamas

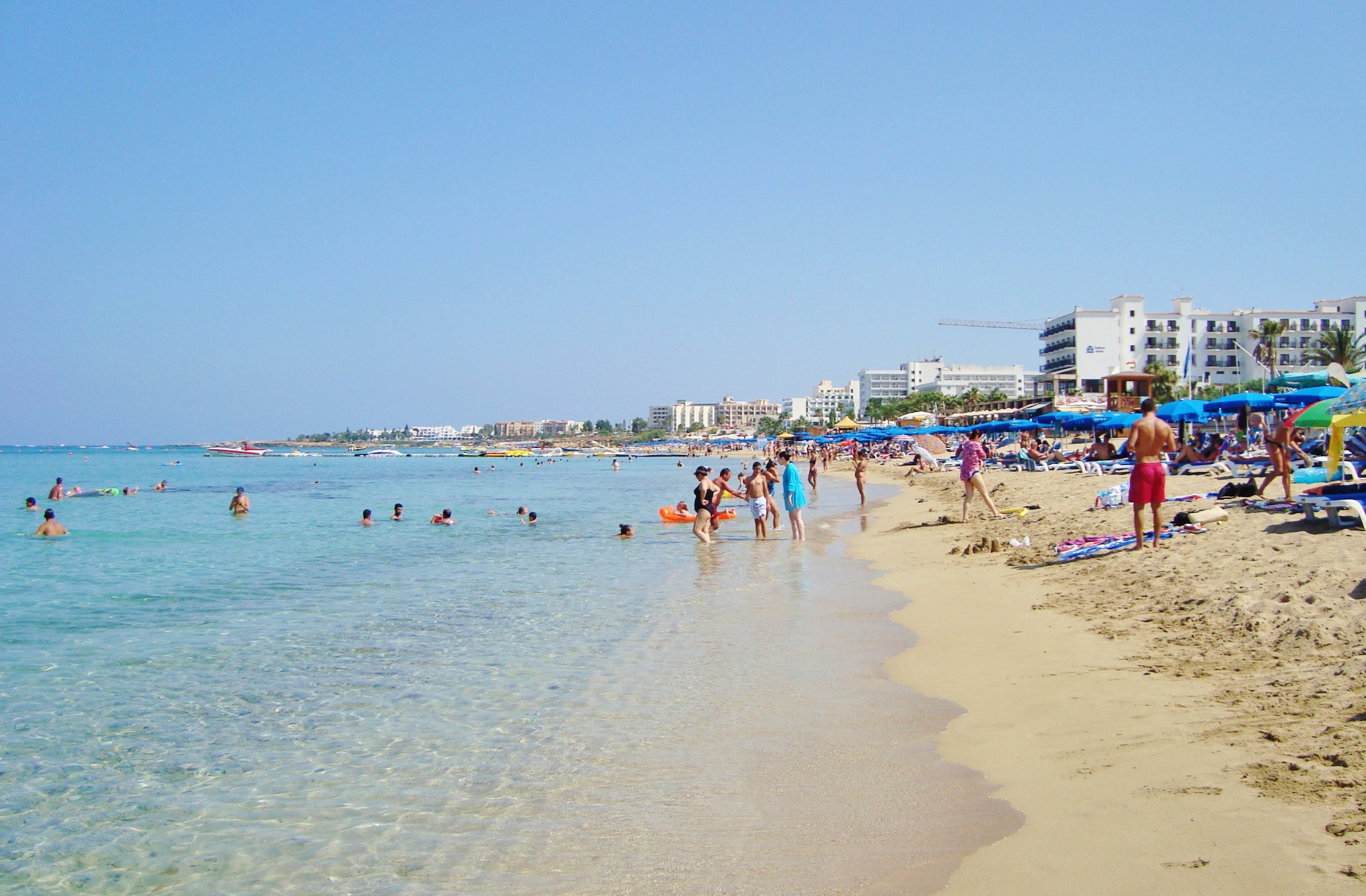
Protaras beach in summer

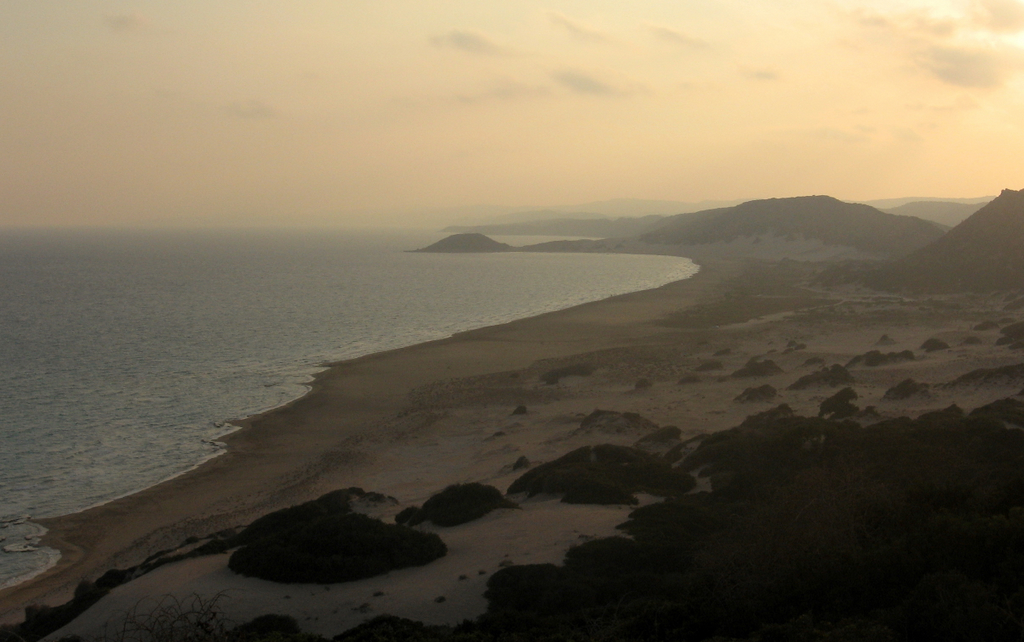
The sandy beaches are often used as habitats for green turtles

Cyprus's popularity, with around 4 million tourists arrivals per year, is attributed to a number of factors. These include the fact that English is widely spoken, its history of British colonialism, and the presence of British military bases at Akrotiri and Dhekelia. The downturn in the British economy in the late 2000s was reflected in a decrease in British tourist arrivals, highlighting the Cyprus tourist industry's over-reliance on a single market.

By 2009, efforts were underway to stimulate tourism from countries other than the UK. In line with geopolitical developments, Russian tourists became the second largest group in terms of arrivals; this began in the late 2000s and rapidly increased until the 2022 Russian invasion of Ukraine.

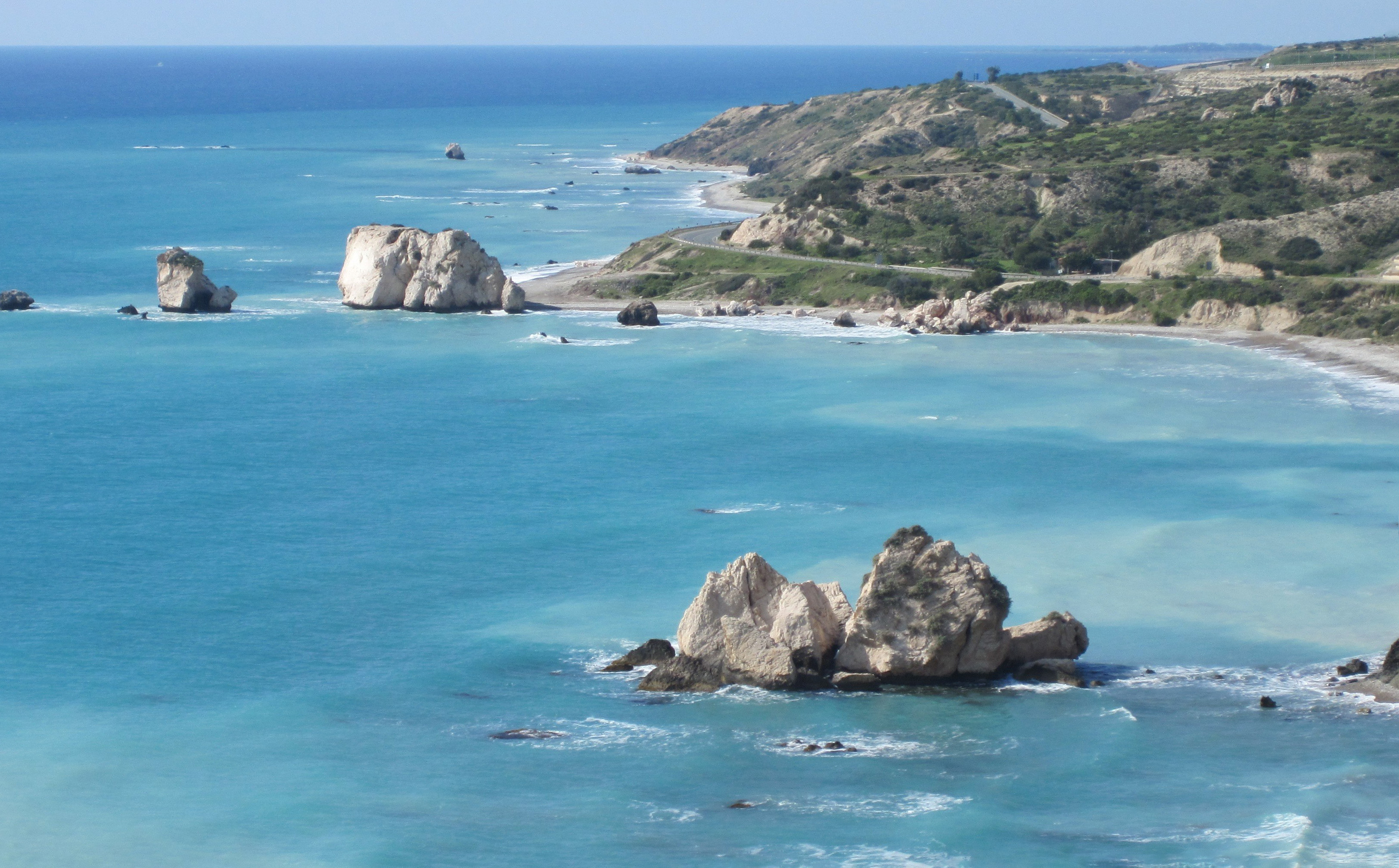
The Rock of the Greek (background) with the Saracen Rock in the foreground

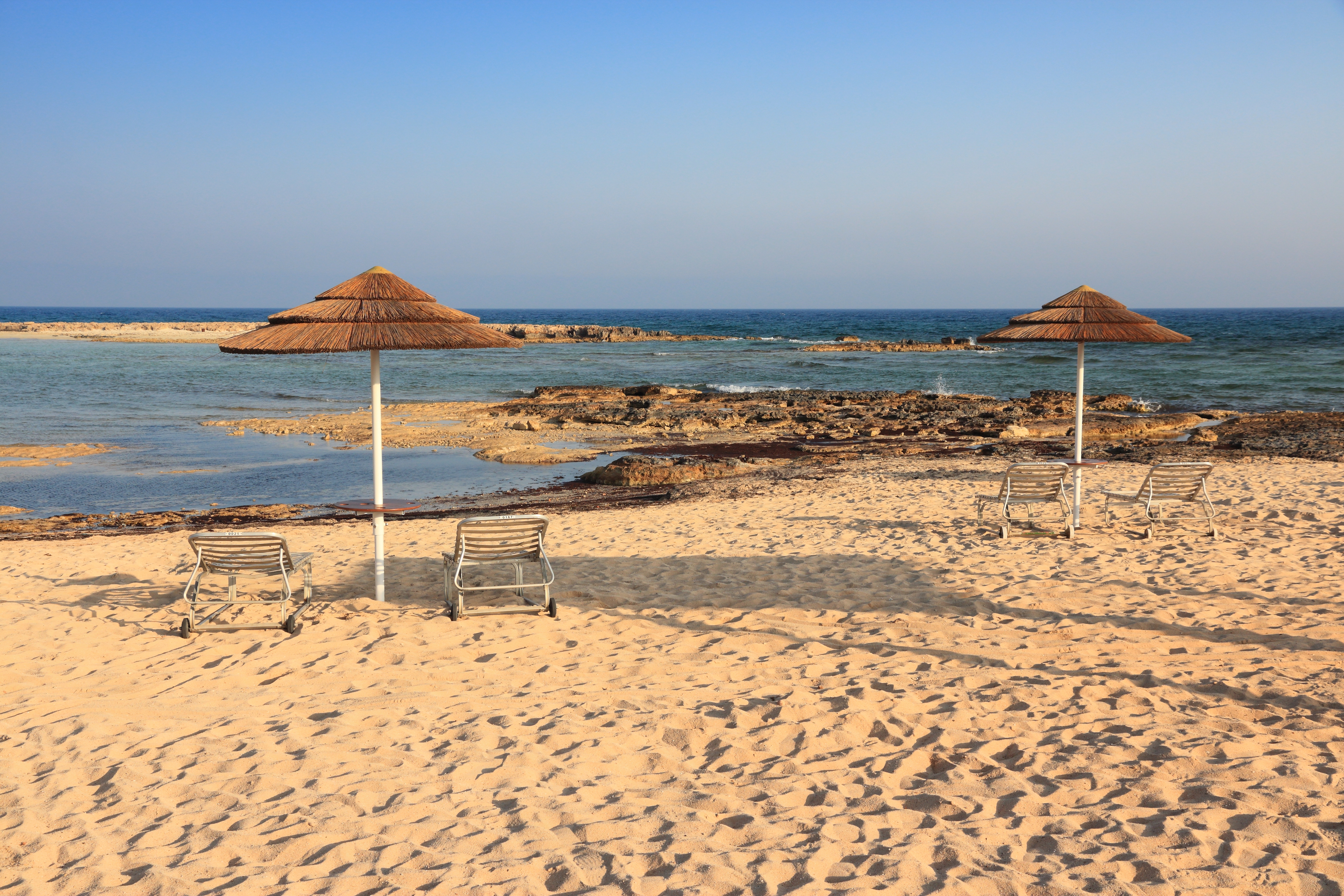
Ayia Thekla beach

The total number of tourists in Cyprus for the 2018 season was 3.93 million. Most visitors arriving on a short-term basis were from the following countries:

Rank	Country	2016	2017	2018
1	United Kingdom	1,157,978	▲1,253,839	▲1,327,805
2	Russia	781,634	▲824,494	▼783,631
3	Israel	148,739	▲261,966	▼232,561
4	Germany	124,030	▲188,826	▲189,200
5	Greece	160,254	▲169,712	▲186,370
6	Sweden	115,019	▲136,725	▲153,769
7	Poland	42,683	▲56,665	▲89,508
8	Switzerland (including Liechtenstein)	46,602	▲57,540	▲74,216
9	Ukraine	62,292	▼48,190	▲69,619
10	Romania	28,741	▲49,304	▲66,969

Rank	Country	2024
1	United Kingdom	1,373,634
2	Israel	425,606
3	Poland	337,139
4	Germany	228,355
5	Greece	183,816
6	Sweden	148,995
7	Romania	95,314
8	France	92,818
9	Austria	75,261
10	Switzerland (including Liechtenstein)	73,946

== Competitiveness ==
=== Studies ===
In 2011, according to the World Economic Forum's Travel and Tourism Competitiveness Report, Cyprus' tourism industry ranked 29th in the world, in terms of overall competitiveness, but secured first place for tourism infrastructure. With some of the most popular and cleanest beaches in Europe, much of the island relies on the "sun, sea, and sand" mantra to attract tourists. This is reflected in the seasonal distribution of tourist arrivals, with a particularly significant increase during the summer months. Resorts in the island's east and southeast, such as Ayia Napa and Protaras, depend almost entirely on tourism and receive the vast majority of their visitors from March to November; tourist destinations in the west and southwest, such as Limassol and Paphos, benefit from more diversified economies, allowing them to sustain tourism even during the much colder winter months.

=== Investment ===
A World Travel and Tourism Council (WTTC), noted that total investment in Cyprus' tourism industry in 2015 was €273.7 million - 14% of the island's overall investment - with projected increases of 5.3% in 2016 and 2.9% annually, over the following decade, reaching €384.6 million in 2026. However, the WTTC’s latest 2023 Economic Impact Research for Cyprus reports that capital investment in travel and tourism reached approximately €3.20 billion in 2022 (about 12.6 % of total investment), with forecasts extending through 2033.

=== Blue Flag beaches ===
According to a 2020 report by KPMG, Cyprus boasts the highest concentration of Blue Flag beaches in the world - most of which are located in the east - ranking first globally in Blue Flag beaches per kilometre of coastline and per capita.

=== Languages ===
English serves as the island's primary bridge language, not only due to Cyprus's history as a British colony until 1960 but also because of its strong reliance on tourism, with British visitors consistently making up the largest share of annual arrivals. Russian was also widely used in the tourist sector until the 2022 Russian invasion of Ukraine led to a sharp decline in Russian tourist, then the island's second largest group of yearly visitors. Greek and Turkish remain the main languages spoken by the native Greek-Cypriot and Turkish-Cypriot communities.

=== Education ===
A 2012 Eurostat report revealed that Cyprus is the second most educated country in Europe after Ireland, with 49.9% of its residents holding university degrees. In 2013, Cyprus ranked fourth among EU countries in public spending on education, allocating 6.5% of its GDP, well above the EU average of 5%.

== The Cyprus Tourism Organisation (CTO) ==
The Cyprus Tourism Organisation (CTO), known as KOT in Greek, functioned as a semi-governmental authority, tasked with overseeing tourism standards and marketing the island internationally. In 2007, the CTO reportedly spent €20 million on international promotional efforts. In 2019, the CTO was replaced by the newly established Deputy Ministry of Tourism, a government body that inherited the CTO's assets and functions.

== See also ==
- Cyprus Museum
- Petra tou Romiou
- Climate of Cyprus
- Cypriot wine
- History of Cyprus
- Economy of Cyprus
- Tombs of the Kings
- Tourism in Northern Cyprus
