= World Association for Waterborne Transport Infrastructure =

International professional organization

- Formation: May 25, 1885
- Type: Engineering Society
- Headquarters: Brussels, Belgium
- Members: 2,100
- Official language: English, French
- President: Francisco Esteban Lefler, ES (since 2019)
- Key people: Geert Van Cappellen, BE (Secretary General)
- Staff: 5
- Website: www.pianc.org

The World Association for Waterborne Transport Infrastructure (PIANC) is an international professional organisation founded in 1885. PIANC’s mission today is to provide expert guidance and technical advice on technical, economic and environmental issues pertaining to waterborne transport infrastructure, including the fields of navigable bodies of water (waterways), such as canals and rivers, as well as ports and marinas. It is headquartered in Brussels in offices provided by the Flemish government of Belgium. Its earlier names were the Association Internationale Permanente des Congres de Navigation (AIPCN) until 1921, then as the Permanent International Association of Navigation Congresses (PIANC). It is additionally known as the International Navigation Association (French: Association Internationale de Navigation).

== History ==
On 25 May 1885, the first Inland Navigation Congress was held in Brussels, providing a forum for an international debate on these questions. After some years, the Inland Navigation Congress merged with the Ocean Navigation Congress and the International Navigation Congress was born. During the Congress in Paris, 1900, a Permanent International Commission for the Navigation Congresses was set up. Two years later statutes were adopted and PIANC was a born. Congresses are held every four years and are spread all over the world. In 1926 it was decided to release a Bulletin every half year to promote the contact between members. The Bulletin still exists, but now in the form of an electronic Magazine. In 1979 it was decided to establish permanent Technical Commissions and that Working Groups will be established under the umbrella of the Technical Commissions to study specific topics. The first Working Group report was issued in 1983 and over 100 others followed suit.

PIANC changed considerably over the years, from an Association organising a Congress every four years, to an Association setting technical guidelines and publishing high ranking reports.

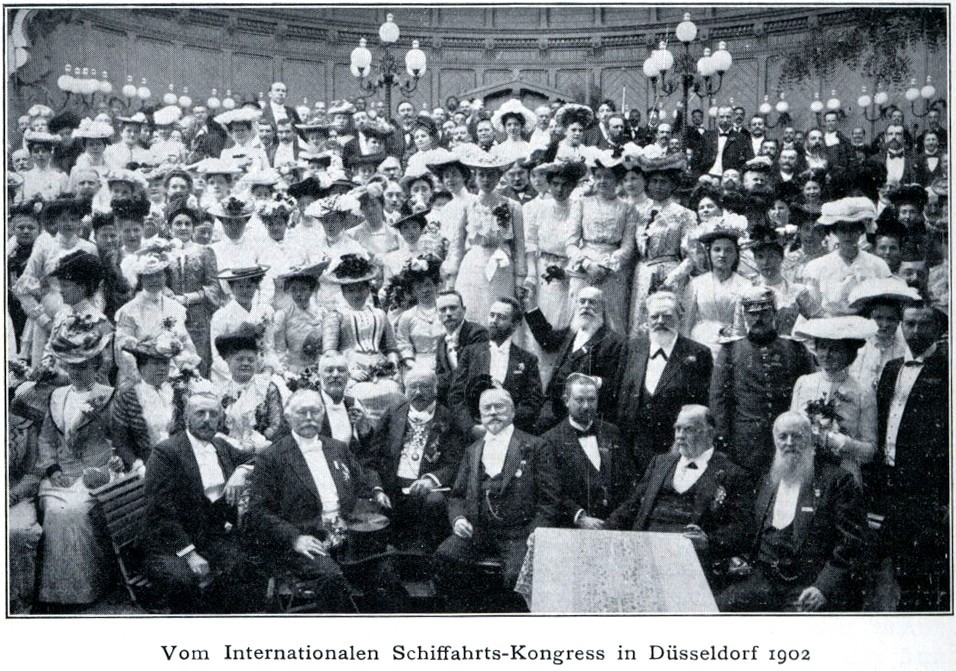
PIANC Congress in Düsseldorf 1902

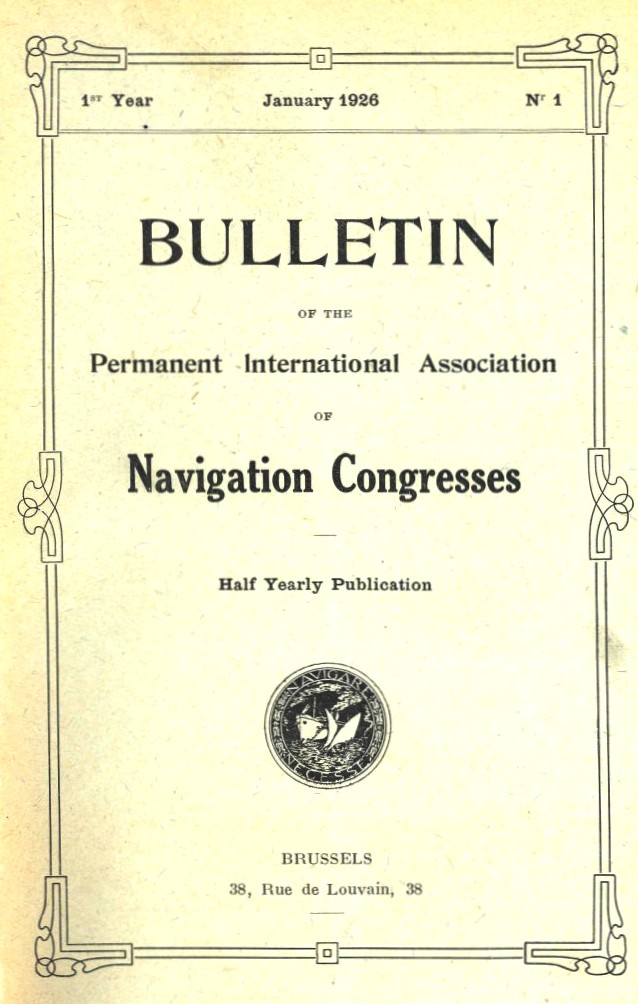
Cover PIANC Bulletin January 1926

== Organization ==
The association is composed of qualifying members, subscribing members and Honorary Members, who can be both legal and natural persons. The qualifying members of the association, having the right to vote in the general assembly, are:

- National governments;
- Regional governments of a national state;
- National sections or national bodies from countries of which the governments are not (any more) a qualifying member; these national sections or national bodies shall obtain the same rights and duties as governmental members after approval of their membership by the Annual General Assembly (AGA);
- intergovernmental organisations

PIANC operates with a President, a General Secretary and Vice-Presidents representing the main areas of the world. The main decision-making body is the General Assembly.

Membership is managed by National Sections and the PIANC Headquarters.

=== World Congress ===
PIANC organizes the World Congress every four years in different areas of the world. Other periodic main events are: - SMART Rivers, focused on inland navigation infrastructure, - COPEDEC congresses, that are held in countries in transition, - Mediterranean Days of Coastal and Port Engineering, focused on the Mediterranean area.

== Commissions ==
The core business of PIANC are the Working Group Reports. Working Groups are composed of international experts that are tasked to prepare technical reports and guidelines in the fields of the waterborne navigation infrastructure design, construction and management. The Working Groups are created and managed by four technical commissions:

- Inland Navigation Commission (InCom)
- Environmental Commission (EnviCom)
- Maritime Navigation Commission (MarCom)
- Recreational Navigation Commission (RecCom)

The other PIANC commissions are:

- International Cooperation Commission (CoCom)
- Finance Commission (FinCom)
- Promotion Commission (ProCom)
- Young Professionals Commission (YPCom)

Overall supervision of all Commissions is provided by the Executive Committee (ExCom).

The Commissions and ExCom are also involved in the organization of congresses and events at an international level, the recognition of awards to the excellences in the fields of interest.

=== Inland ===
The Inland Navigation Commission (InCom) is in charge of the activities of PIANC in the field of inland waterways in co-operation with MarCom, ReCom and EnviCom. InCom will network with other international organisations/commissions to reach PIANC’s strategic goals. Chairperson: (...-current) Mr Philippe Rigo (BE)

=== Environmental ===
The Environmental Commission (EnviCom) is responsible for dealing with broad and very specific environmental issues of interest to PIANC and representing PIANC in the international organisations dealing with these issues such as the London Convention, OSPAR, WODA and the EU. It is further recognised that the site-specific environmental impacts of inland navigation or maritime activities are partnered and/or dealt with respectively by InCom and MarCom. Furthermore, EnviCom is responsible for broad and generic environmental issues that cross-cut all PIANC areas. EnviCom is networking with other navigation related interests and has communications with non-traditional groups dealing with environmental affairs and training needs. The Commission also initiates efforts to enhance PIANC membership with environmental specialists. Chairperson: (2017–present) Mr Todd Bridges (US)

=== Maritime ===
The Maritime Navigation Commission (MarCom) is responsible for dealing with maritime ports and seaways issues of interest to PIANC. MarCom co-operates with other Commissions when issues can be seen to have a broader perspective, for example when they also have an environmental or inland impact. MarCom also co-operates and communicates with other international organisations such as IMO, IAPH, WODA, etc. Chairperson: (...-2019) Mr Francisco Esteban Lefler (ES)

=== Recreational Navigation ===
The Recreational Navigation Commission (RecCom) has been established to deal with aspects directly related to sport and recreational navigation, to develop aids for this kind of navigation and facilitate its integration among the other types of navigation (commercial and fishing). RecCom works closely together with other organisations such as the International Council of Marine Industry Associations (ICOMIA). RecCom is composed by experts coming from all the continents and manages working groups that develop the technical reports and guidelines. The Commission is responsible for the PIANC Marina Excellence Design "Jack Nichol" Award. The Commission started also the PIANC Marina Designer Training Program (MDTP), with the aim of organizing specific courses for marina design. Chairperson: (2017–present) Mr Esteban L. Biondi (AR) - (2009-2017) Mr Elio Ciralli (IT) - (2005-2009) Mr Marcello Conti (IT) - (1994-2005) Mr Caes Van der Wildt (NL) - (1982-1994) Mr P. Hofmann Frisch (DE).

=== Awards ===
PIANC established and manage, through the Technical Commissions, the following international awards:

- PIANC De Paepe-Willems Award
- PIANC Marina Excellence Design "Jack Nichol" Award (MEDA)
- PIANC YP Award
- PIANC Working with Nature Award

The different PIANC awards have specific rules and regulations.
