= Genoa International Boat Show =

Coordinates: 44°23′41″N 8°56′18″E

Genoa International Boat Show Salone Nautico Internazionale di Genova
- Status: Active
- Genre: Boat Show
- Locations: Renzo Piano's Levante Waterfront, Genoa
- Country: Italy
- Inaugurated: 1962; 64 years ago
- Previous event: 19 – 24 September 2024
- Next event: 18 – 23 September 2025
- Attendance: 350,000
- Organizer: I Saloni Nautici, Confindustria Nautica
- Website: https://salonenautico.com/en/

The Genoa International Boat Show (Italian: Salone Nautico di Genova) is one of the world's premier boat shows, held annually in Genoa (Italy, EU). The exhibition is organised by Confindustria Nautica, the Italian Marine Industry Association.

== History ==
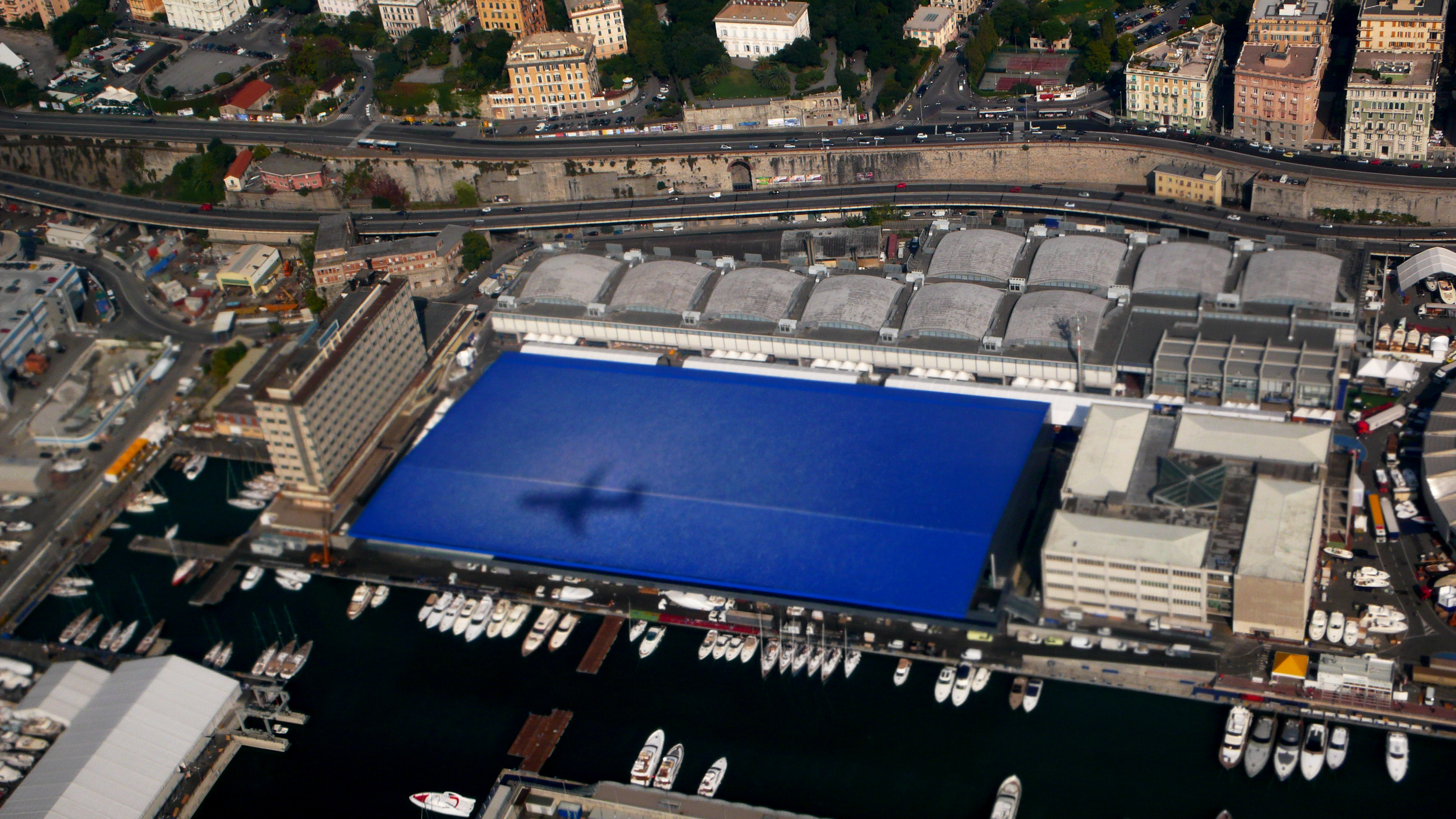
aerial view of Pavilion B

Owing the popularity of nautical tourism along the Italian Riviera, as well as Genoa's history as a city for the ship and yacht building industry, the 1st International Boat Show was opened by Senator De Gregorio, Undersecretary to the Treasury, on 27 January 1962. With 300,000 visitors that year, the Genoa Boat Show was an instant success.

Over the years, the Boat show grew mainly by an increasing number of exhibitors and professional organisations attending the show, and with the 46th International Boat Show in 2006, the marina underwent one of its most substantial extensions. In 2009 the new 20.000 sqm Pavilion B - designed by French architect Jean Nouvel - was opened.

Since its inception, the shows were officially opened by Italian government ministers of Economy and Finance, Infrastructures and Transports respectively. Next to the boot Düsseldorf trade fair, the Salone Nautico is regarded as one of the world's largest boat shows.

== Exhibition spaces ==
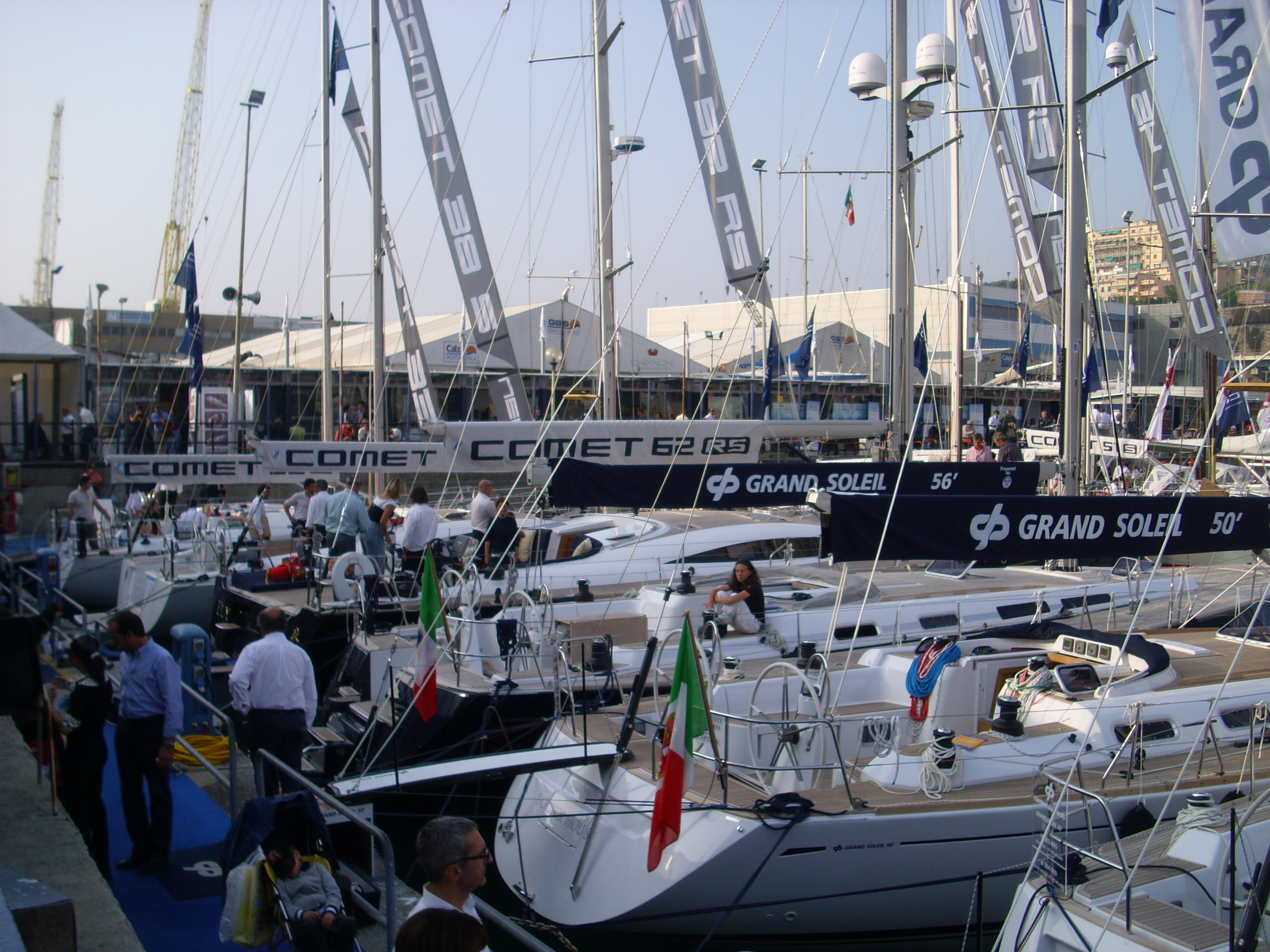
exhibition at anchor

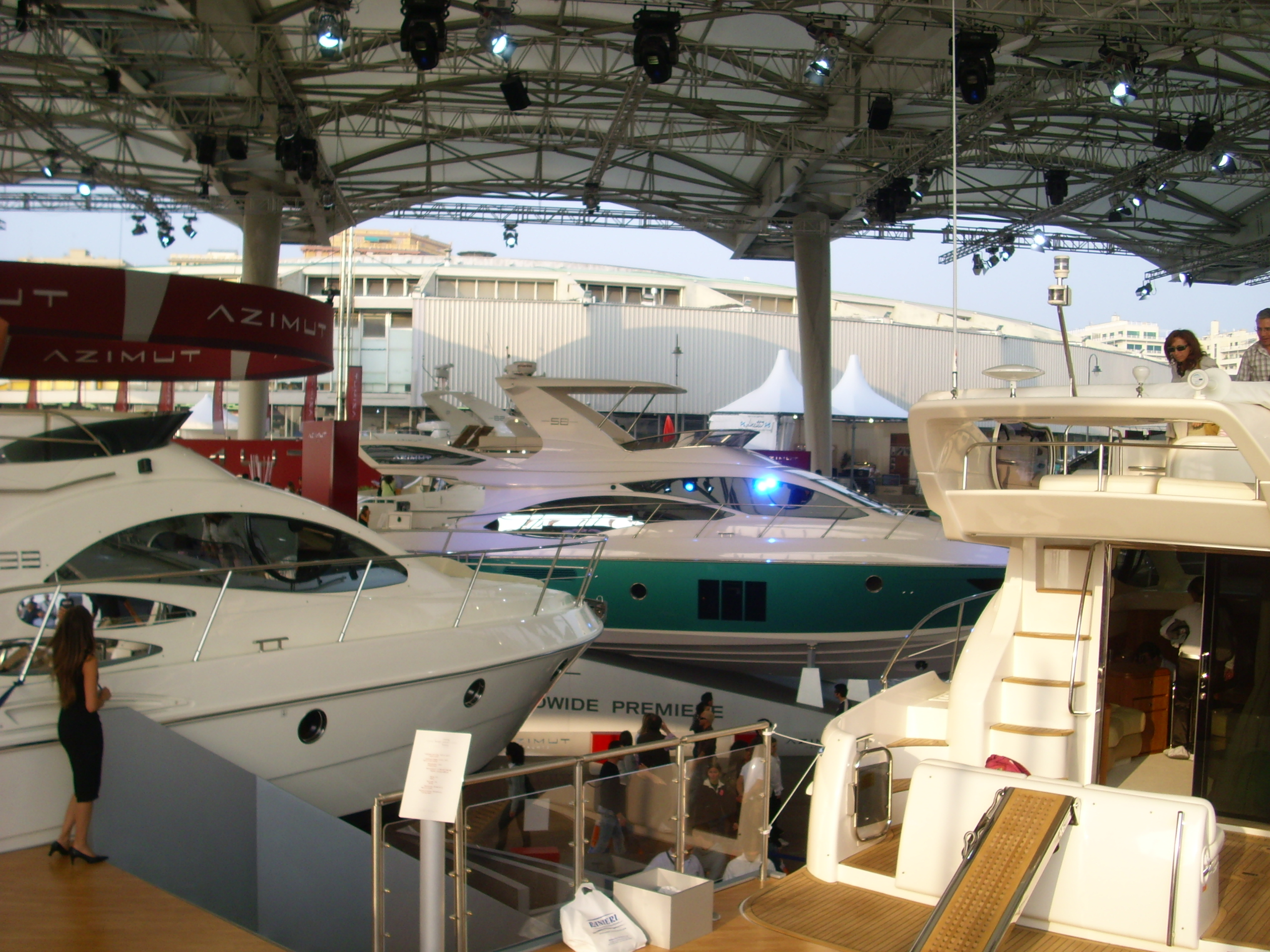
indoor exhibition space

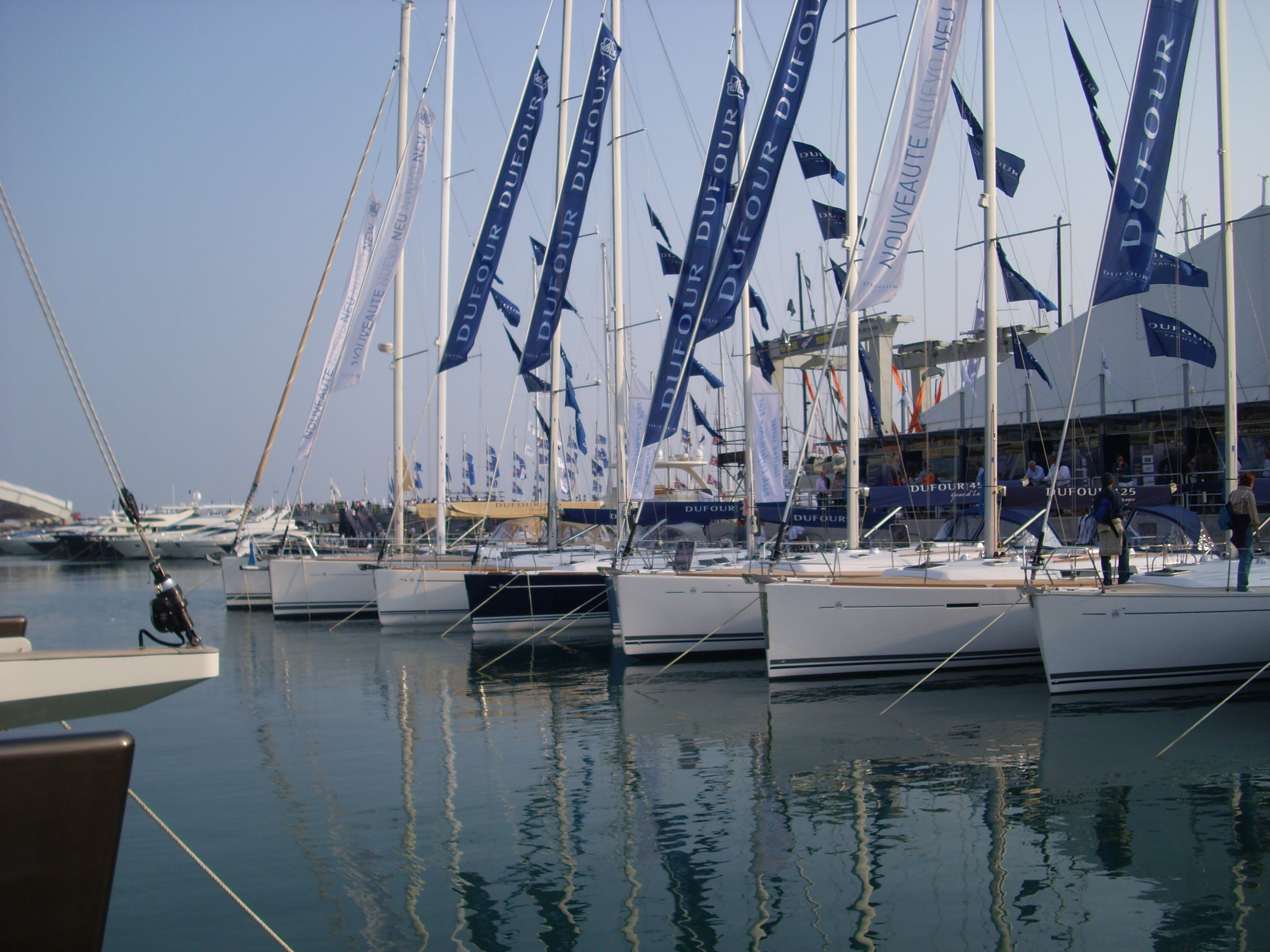
sailing boats

As the largest event on the Mediterranean, the Genoa Boat Show has over 200,000 square metres of display area on land and sea.

The layout provides a TechTrade Fair dedicated to components and equipment, a sailing boat show (Sailing World), an area dedicated to outboard motorboats (Boat Discovery) and a Yacht and Superyacht Show.

== See also ==
- History of Genoa
- List of sailboat designers and manufacturers
- Shipbuilding companies of Italy
