= Twiggy the Water-Skiing Squirrel =

Novelty act (1979-present)

Twiggy the Water-Skiing Squirrel is an animal novelty act featuring an eastern gray squirrel who skis around a heated pool. The original Twiggy was adopted in 1978 by Florida roller-skating rink owners Chuck and Lou Ann Best. They taught her to water ski, which made international news. The Best family began traveling with Twiggy for national tours, film appearances, and media profiles. Forty years after Twiggy's debut, Chuck and Lou Ann Best's son, Chuck Jr, took over operations of the squirrel performances. Twiggy doesn't mind water-skiing, according to Lou Ann Best, who told The Washington Post in 2016 "there's nothing unnatural about what she's doing."

== History ==
Chuck and Lou Ann Best, a couple living in Sanford, Florida, operated a roller-skating rink where they featured animal performers including a roller-skating chimpanzee named Moose. In 1978, a roofer friend gave the couple an orphaned squirrel who had fallen out of a tree during a storm. They named her Twiggy and kept her in their home as a family pet. Twiggy was friendly, but she sometimes hid food. "You wouldn't believe the places I find peanuts," Lou Ann said in 1979. Twiggy would ride on the family members' shoulders in their pool. After Chuck Sr. purchased a remote-controlled boat for his daughter, he jokingly taught Twiggy to water-ski, initially training her in the bathtub.

The Best family brought Twiggy to Lake Monroe and trained her to stand on small skis that Chuck Sr. had made from plastic foam and packing crates. Training took about a month, and the Bests used peanut butter as a reward for Twiggy. In August 1979, the Orlando Sentinel wrote an article about Twiggy which the United Press International published worldwide. In the article, Chuck Best said that Twiggy had not earned any money, but that he was open to sponsorships from companies that sold boats, water skis, and peanut butter. Later that year, after an organizer reached out to the Bests, Twiggy made her live performance debut at a boat show in Palm Beach.

== Performances ==
Following the success of Twiggy's first water-skiing performance in 1979, the Bests brought Twiggy's water-ski act to crowds across the country. The Bests sold their roller rink and began touring with Twiggy full-time in a motor home. Twiggy was featured on the TV program Real People, which gave her a national audience. Lou Ann said in 2003 that Twiggy had taken her all around North America, as well as to Paris and Bermuda.

Since gray squirrels only live about six years, the Bests have had at least eleven different "Twiggy" squirrels. A young squirrel was always trained and kept "on deck" and the retired squirrels live out their lives as family pets. The squirrels are trained to ride on buoyant foam blocks, which are then towed behind a remote-controlled boat. Training takes about two years. The Bests say that the squirrels can only focus for about ten minutes of instruction at a time. Lou Ann said in 2003 that training a squirrel was "kinda like training a husband" because "you have to give them a lot of love and affection and tell them the same thing over and over again."

=== Water safety messaging ===
In 1997, Chuck Best drowned when he dove off a boat to rescue his stepfather and suffered from a heart attack while in the water. Following her husband's death, Lou Ann initially quit performances with the squirrels. However, messages from fans encouraged her to restart the program, this time with hand-sewed life jackets for the squirrels and a water safety message incorporated into Twiggy's performance. Twiggy is the "spokes-animal" for the National Safe Boating Council's "Wear It" life jacket campaign.

=== Retirement and return ===
Lou Ann announced her retirement from the Twiggy performances in 2018, and she performed a farewell tour with the squirrels. She stated plans to release an autobiography and children's books.

However, Twiggy didn't remain retired for long. In 2019, one year after Twiggy's retirement, Chuck and Lou Ann Best's son, Chuck Best Jr announced on Twiggy's YouTube channel that he planned to bring back the Twiggy the Water-Skiing Squirrel show. He had previously planned to work at a stockbroker but decided to manage the water-skiing squirrel instead, which he said was "actually a lot more fun" than finance. He managed a tour celebrating for Twiggy the Water-Skiing Squirrel's 40th anniversary along with his fiancé, Toni Tedesco. The lead squirrel was Twiggy XI, and the performance added an additional squirrel called Twig Jr and a dog called Roxie the Lifeguard. In January 2020, Twiggy performed at the Toronto International Boat Show, a show that was advertised as Twiggy's "triumphant return" from retirement. However, the water-skiing squirrel drew criticism from animal rights groups in addition to Toronto's animal services department, since the city prohibits the keeping of eastern gray squirrels in captivity. Twiggy is no longer welcome in Toronto.

=== Animal wellbeing and other training ===
In 2020, a Vancouver-area animal activist characterized the act as "grotesque" and raised concern for the squirrels' wellbeing, calling them "caged, food-deprived, and subjected to force training". Lou Ann Best claimed, however, that the Twiggies were not bothered or harmed by the water-skiing. In 2016, The Washington Post reported that Lou Ann was a licensed wildlife rehabilitator. While Chuck Jr. was Twiggy's manager, in 2022, he told MLive that he wouldn't recommend squirrels as pets for the general public: "They are fun to watch, but if you find a squirrel, find a local rehabber."

According to Twiggy's website, Chuck and Lou Ann did not limit themselves to squirrel training. They claimed to have successfully taught water-skiing to "two miniature horses, two French poodles, a black cat, an armadillo and a toad." They stated that in addition to teaching squirrels to water-ski, they taught them to ride a jet-ski, ski in a three-squirrel pyramid, hang glide, and ride in a helicopter.

== Filmography ==
Twiggy has appeared in the films Dodgeball: A True Underdog Story and Anchorman: The Legend of Ron Burgundy. Twiggy has also made appearances on screen in the 2001 film Down to Earth, Megamind, and the music video for Brad Paisley's 2014 single "River Bank". She has made TV appearances on Real People in 1979, Pet Stars, and America's Got Talent in 2012. Twiggy was shown climbing on host Nick Cannon, who said that he and the squirrel were "not friends". Since only one of the three judges voted for her, she did not advance to the next round.

Twiggy has appeared in advertisements for Ford, GoPro, Ripley's Believe It or Not, California Walnuts, and Elite Endless Pool.
