= Boot Düsseldorf =

Boat and water sports trade fair in Düsseldorf, Germany

boot Düsseldorf
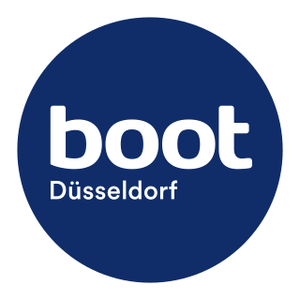
- Genre: Boat show and water sports trade fair
- Venue: Messe Düsseldorf
- Locations: Düsseldorf, Germany
- Inaugurated: 1969
- Attendance: 198,988 (2026)
- Organizer: Messe Düsseldorf
- Website: www.boot.de

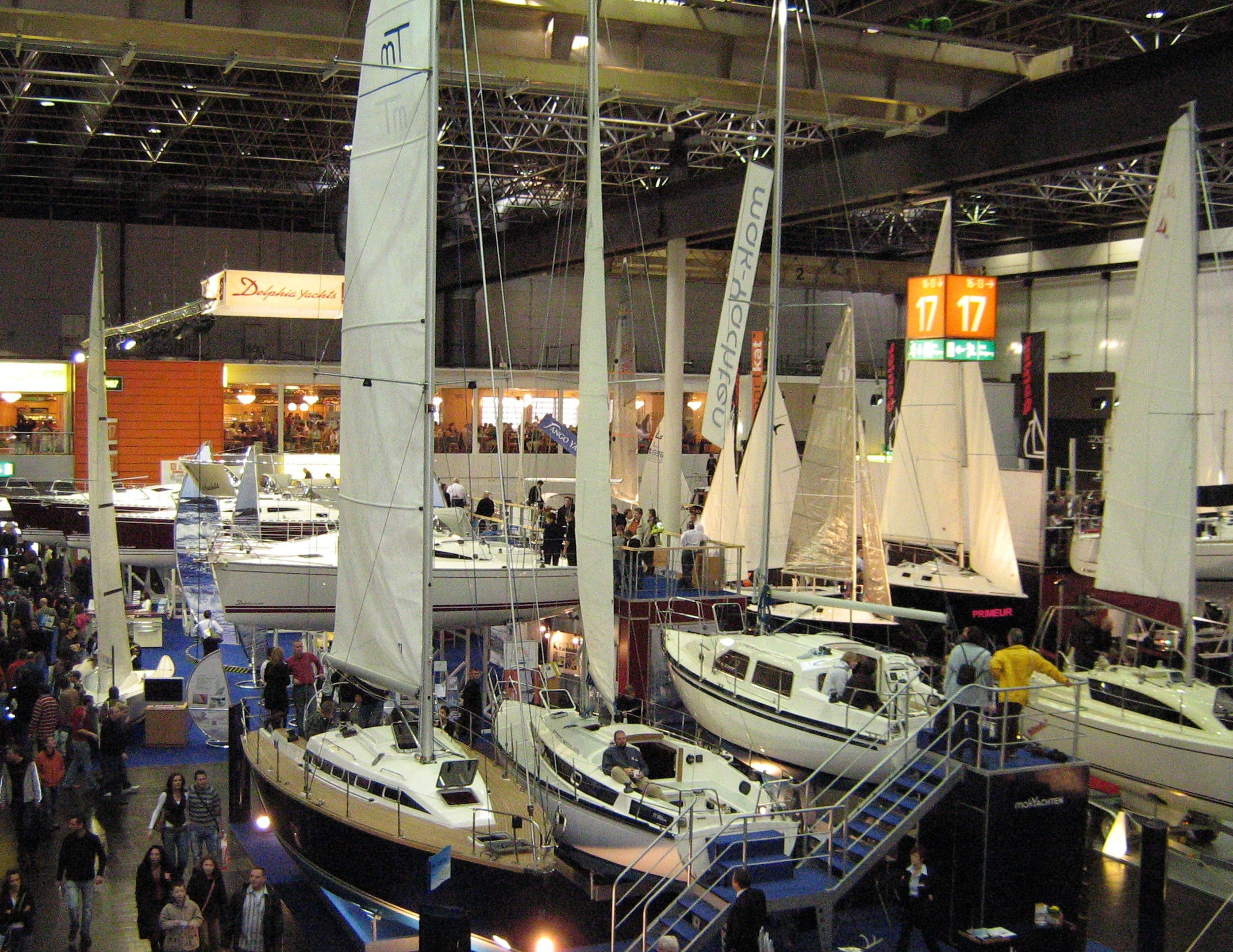
Exhibition hall at boot 2007

The boot Düsseldorf, or simply boot (German pronunciation: [boːt]; officially the Düsseldorf International Boat Show, German: Internationale Bootsausstellung Düsseldorf), is an international trade fair for boats and water sports. It is held annually in January by Messe Düsseldorf at its exhibition grounds beside the Rhine in Düsseldorf and is regarded as the largest event of its kind in the world. Because the entire fair takes place indoors, even large yachts are exhibited in full. The programme spans boats and yachts of all sizes as well as equipment, water sports gear and offerings around diving, surfing, paddling and water tourism. The boot combines the character of an industry trade fair for the maritime economy with that of a consumer show for water sports enthusiasts.

== History ==
=== Founding ===
The fair goes back to an initiative by the boating journalist Horst Schlichting and the trade fair director Kurt Schoop, who in 1969 established the first major boat show in inland Germany. Its organiser was the Nordwestdeutsche Ausstellungs-Gesellschaft (NOWEA), today's Messe Düsseldorf. The first boot opened on 27 November 1969 at the former exhibition grounds on Fischerstraße. Over six days, 116 exhibitors from seven nations took part, and some 34,000 people visited the show, which occupied a single hall. A boat show far from the coast was considered unusual at the time.

=== Development into a leading fair ===
In its second year, the number of exhibitors rose to 183 companies from 25 countries, on twice the exhibition space. In 1972 the boot moved to the newly built exhibition grounds in the north of Düsseldorf and at the same time adopted its January date, which it has kept ever since and with which it opens the year's trade fair season. With the larger site the offering grew as well: the run was extended to nine days, and for the first time a regatta pool was installed in which visitors could sail inside the hall. The first sailboards were shown at the boot in 1973.

From the mid-1970s the fair presented annually changing partner countries, beginning with Canada in 1976. From the original boat and equipment exhibition, a leading fair for the whole of water sports developed over the decades. Formative was the early concept of devoting individual halls to particular themes; in this way dedicated areas emerged for sailing, motorboats, diving, board sports and water tourism. Superyachts were first exhibited in the early 1990s; in 1998 the world exposition Expo '98 in Lisbon was a partner of the fair, under the common theme "The Oceans, a Heritage for the Future". With its 40th edition in 2008, the boot reached an exhibition area of around 220,000 square metres in 17 halls for the first time.

=== Pandemic and return ===
Owing to the COVID-19 pandemic, the fair was cancelled twice in a row. The edition planned for January 2021 was first postponed to April and then called off entirely; the 2022 boot was prohibited by the government of North Rhine-Westphalia a few weeks before its opening, during the Omicron wave. In January 2023 the boot returned to regular operation.

=== Recent developments ===
After the pandemic, participation figures settled again. At the 2025 boot, Bavaria and Hanse, two of the largest German production yards, did not bring their own exhibits; both returned with sailing yachts in 2026. Also in 2025, a dedicated hall area for foiling was introduced with the Foiling World. The 2026 boot took place from 17 to 25 January and counted just under 200,000 visitors.

== Concept ==
=== Target groups ===
The boot addresses two groups. As a trade fair it serves manufacturers, shipyards, dealers, charter operators and service providers of the maritime economy, together with buyers from large charter companies who compare the market's offerings. As a consumer show it also reaches a broad leisure public of sailors, motorboaters, divers, surfers and travellers.

=== Themed areas ===
The offering is divided into themed hall areas and covers almost every branch of water sports. Alongside sailing and motorboating, these include yachting, diving, angling, rowing, canoeing and kayaking, water skiing, wakeboarding, windsurfing and kitesurfing, surfing and personal watercraft; in addition there are topics such as water tourism, marine conservation and maritime art.

At its core are sailing yachts and dinghies, motorboats with conventional as well as alternative propulsion, and luxury yachts. Technical equipment takes up a large share, including engines, transmissions, electrics and electronics, navigation, and deck and interior fittings, complemented by clothing and accessories. Sailing regions and charter companies also present themselves.

A distinctive feature is the water pools built inside the halls, in which individual disciplines are demonstrated and can be tried out. They include a diving tower in the diving area and a large pool on which competitions and hands-on activities in surfing and board sports take place.

== Exhibitors and visitors ==
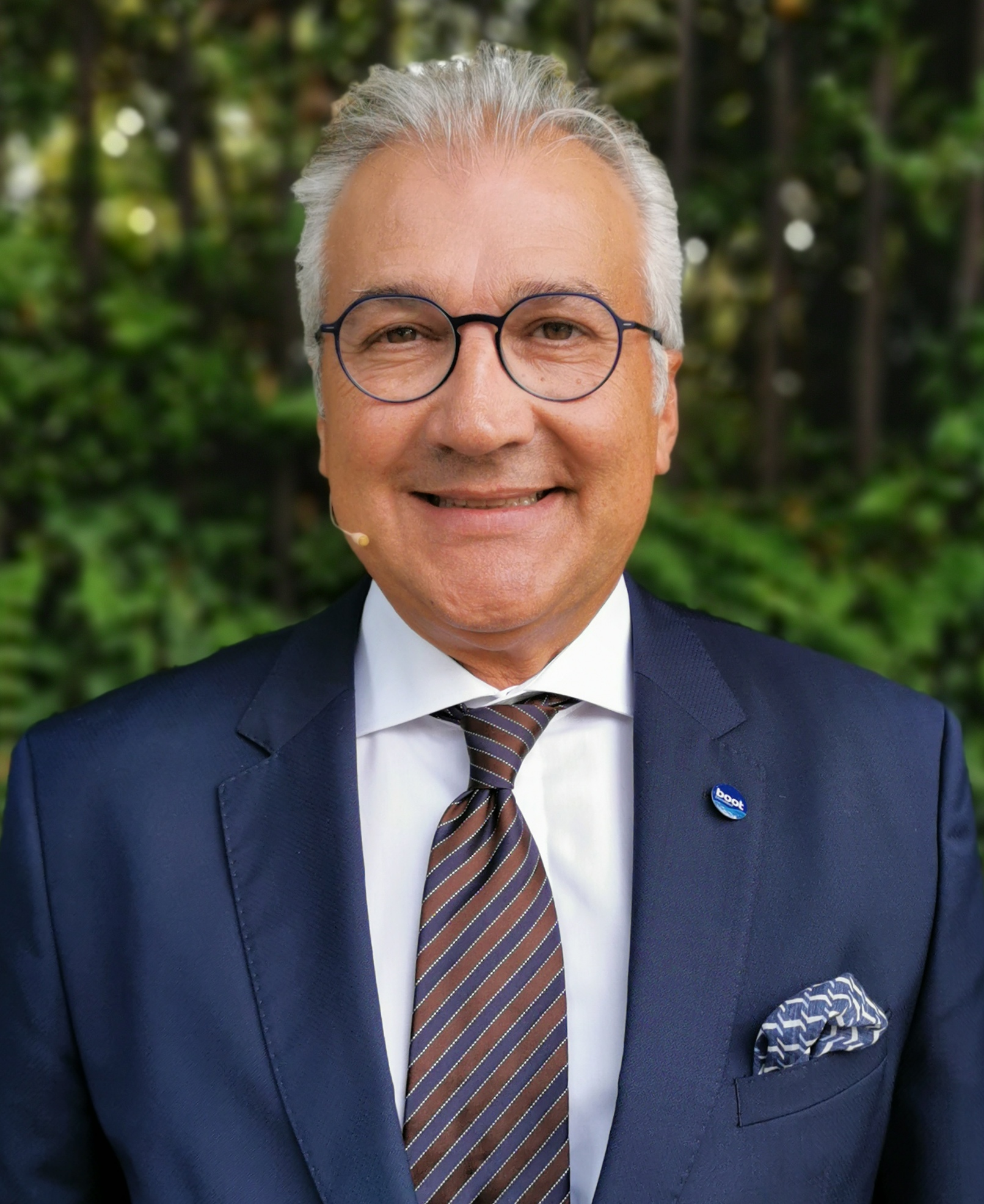
Petros Michelidakis (2022)

The boot regularly occupies around 220,000 square metres of exhibition space in 16 halls. About 1,500 exhibitors from 65 to 70 nations take part; a majority travel from abroad, with Italy, the Netherlands and France among the strongest exhibiting nations. The fair draws around 200,000 visitors from more than 100 countries and is thus regarded as an international meeting point for the industry. As a fully indoor event held inland, the boot differs from in-water shows such as the Genoa International Boat Show.

The boot recorded its highest visitor numbers in the early 2000s; around 354,000 guests came in 2002. Since then the figures have tended to decline, settling at around 240,000 to 250,000 in the 2010s. The fair recorded its largest number of exhibitors in 2019, with 1,973 companies. Following the pandemic interruption, attendance has stood at roughly 200,000 visitors and about 1,500 exhibitors.

The director of the boot since 2016 has been Petros Michelidakis; from 2008 to 2016 it was led by Goetz-Ulf Jungmichel.

Year	Dates	Visitors	Exhibitors
2002	19–27 January	354,000	1,682
2003	18–26 January	309,000	1,700
2004	17–25 January	309,000	1,650
2005	15–23 January	283,000	1,659
2006	21–29 January	292,000	1,650
2007	20–28 January	273,000	1,644
2008	19–27 January	279,000	1,699
2009	17–25 January	238,000	1,641
2010	23–31 January	240,200	1,568
2011	22–30 January	252,441	1,582
2012	21–29 January	246,700	1,656
2013	19–27 January	226,300	1,674
2014	18–26 January	248,600	1,661
2015	17–25 January	240,200	1,741
2016	23–31 January	247,000	1,800
2017	21–29 January	242,000	1,800
2018	20–28 January	247,000	1,923
2019	19–27 January	247,789	1,973
2020	18–26 January	250,000	1,900
2021	cancelled	–	–
2022	cancelled	–	–
2023	21–29 January	237,000	1,500
2024	20–28 January	214,000	1,500
2025	18–26 January	200,000	1,500
2026	17–25 January	198,988	1,500

All data from the boot archives.

== Supporting programme ==
The exhibition is complemented by a supporting programme of talks, seminars, workshops and stage events. The Refit Center addresses repair, maintenance and boatbuilding; in the surf and board sports area, international athletes compete on an indoor pool in disciplines such as wakeboarding, stand-up paddling and wing and pump foiling. The diving area offers demonstrations and taster sessions at a diving tower. There is a dedicated programme for children, including the Kid's World, marine conservation workshops and a high-rope course beside the canoeing run.

In addition, there are special shows and activity areas, among others on sustainable water sports, inclusion in sailing and travel destinations. Information and training offerings are also provided in cooperation with associations such as the German Sailing Association and the German Motor Yachting Association.

== Awards ==
The industry prizes "European Yacht of the Year" for sailing yachts and "European Powerboat of the Year" for motorboats are presented at the boot. The "European Yacht of the Year" goes back to an initiative of the German magazine Yacht; both prizes are decided by a jury of test editors and editors-in-chief of leading European sailing and motorboat magazines.
