= Tourism in Northern Cyprus =

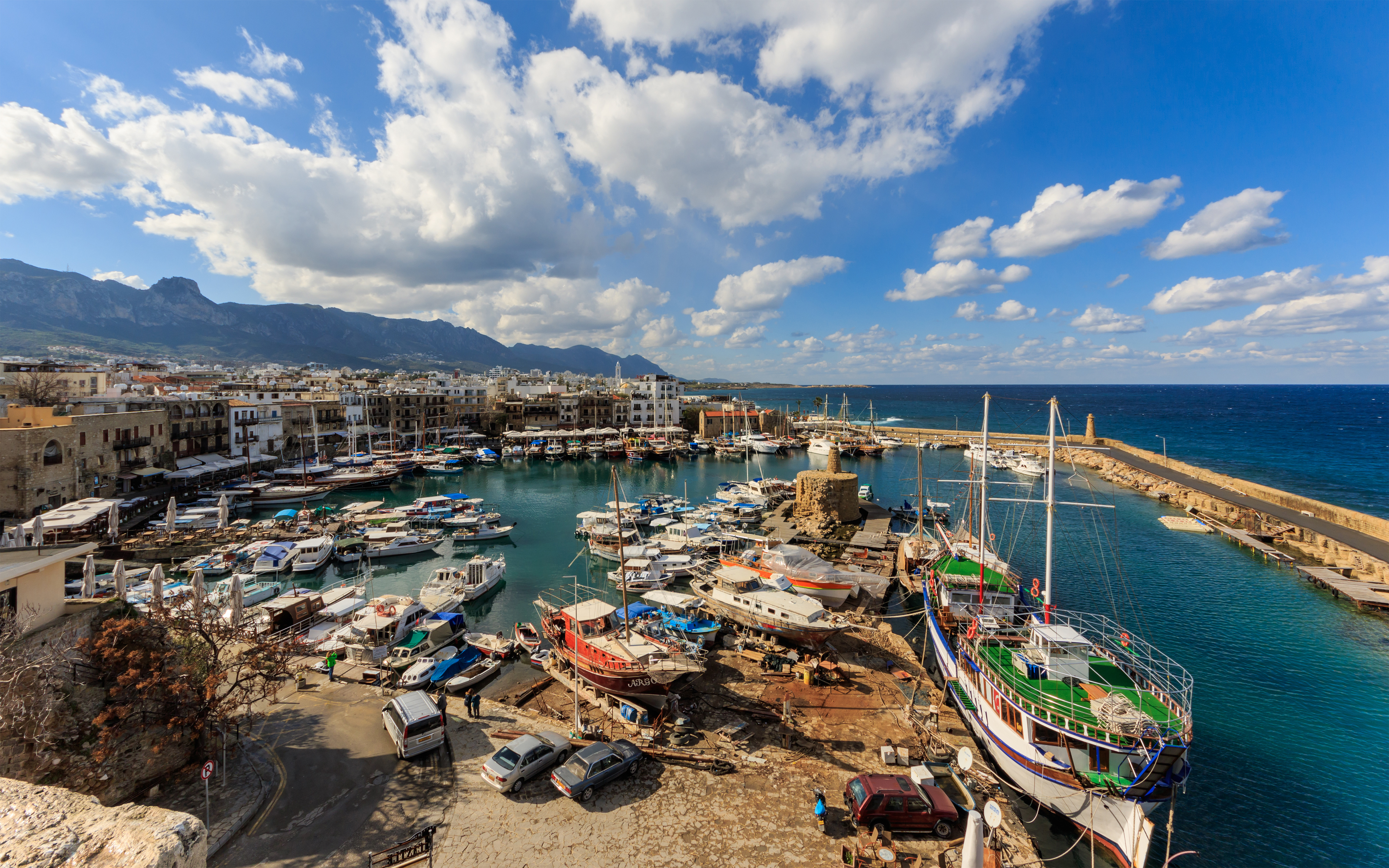
Kyrenia (Girne) is one of the main tourist resorts in Northern Cyprus. Tourism is one of the dominant sectors of the Northern Cyprus' economy.

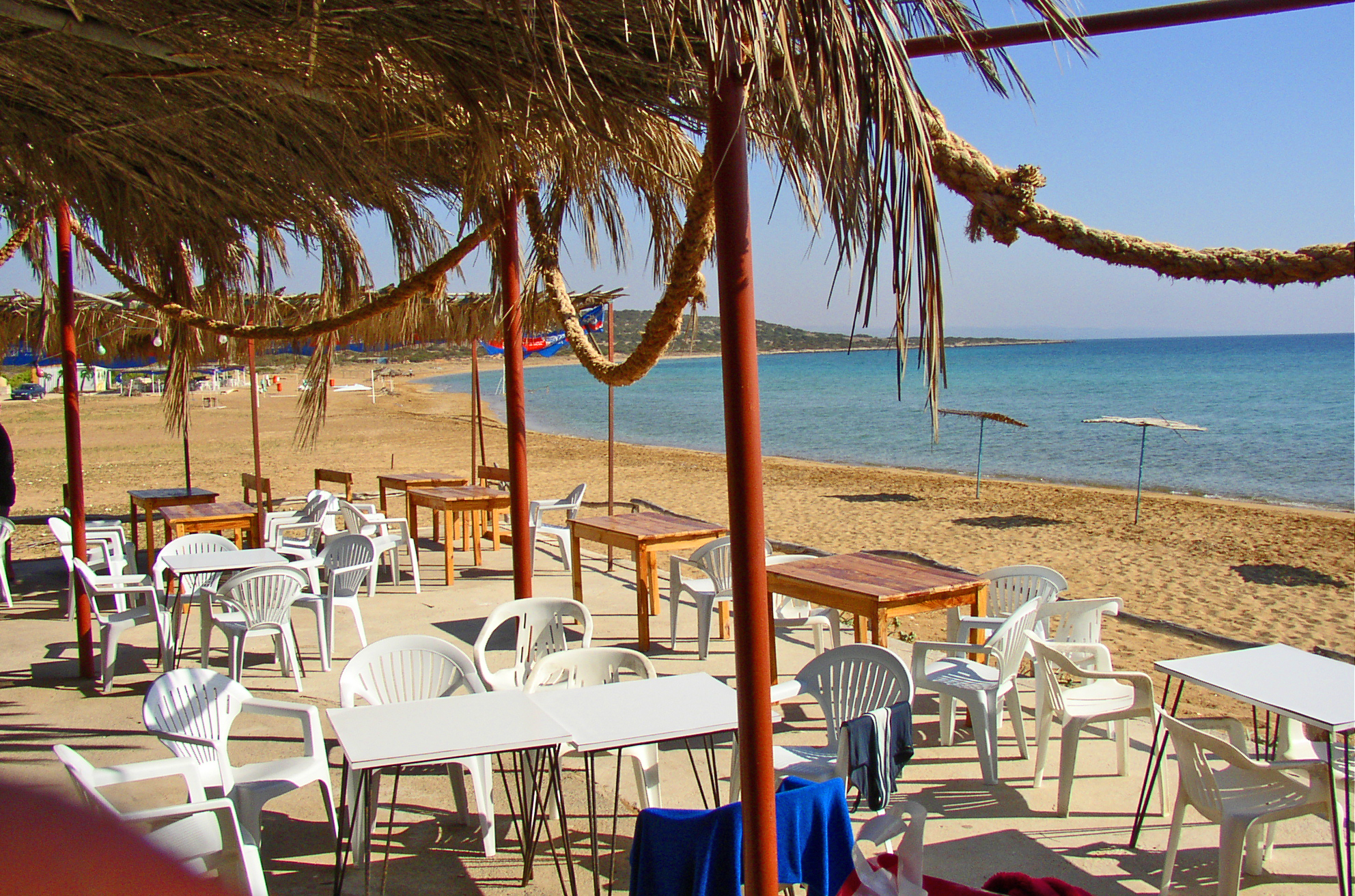
Beach near Mehmetcik, İskele District.

Tourism has affected the development of Northern Cyprus. Its share of the GDP of Northern Cyprus is significant.

In the early 1970s Varosha, Famagusta was the most popular destination in Cyprus, (and popular in the world) before its abandonment in Turkish invasion of Cyprus 1974.

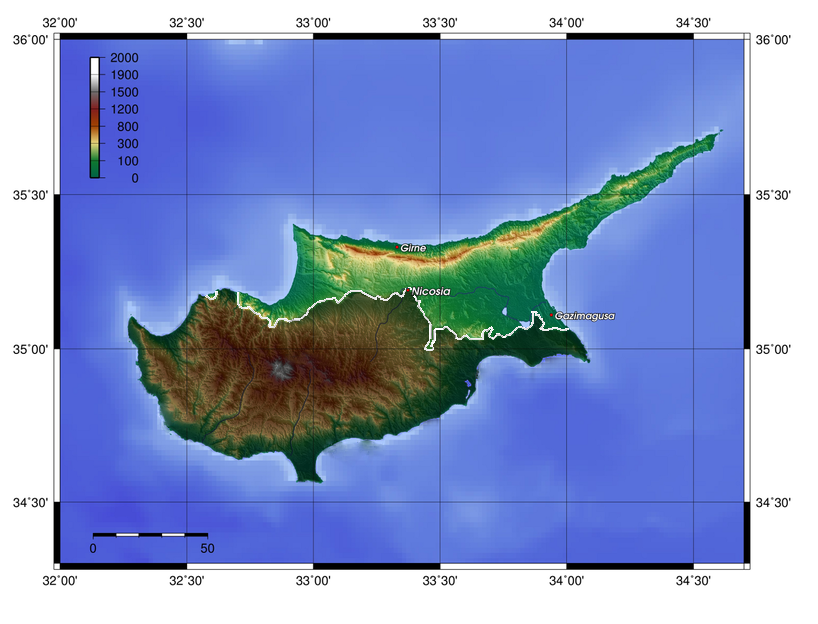
Topographic map of Northern Cyprus with the Kyrenia Mountains to the North and the Karpaz Peninsula to the east

== Arrivals by country ==
Tourists arrivals by country (As of the end of 2012):

	Country\Year	2003	% (2003)	2012	% (2012)	2013
1	Turkey	340.000		904.000		
2	UK (non-Turkish Cypriot)			47.160		
3	UK (TCs)			26.200		
4	Germany			23.580		
5	Iran			20.960		
	Total	470.000		1.166.000		

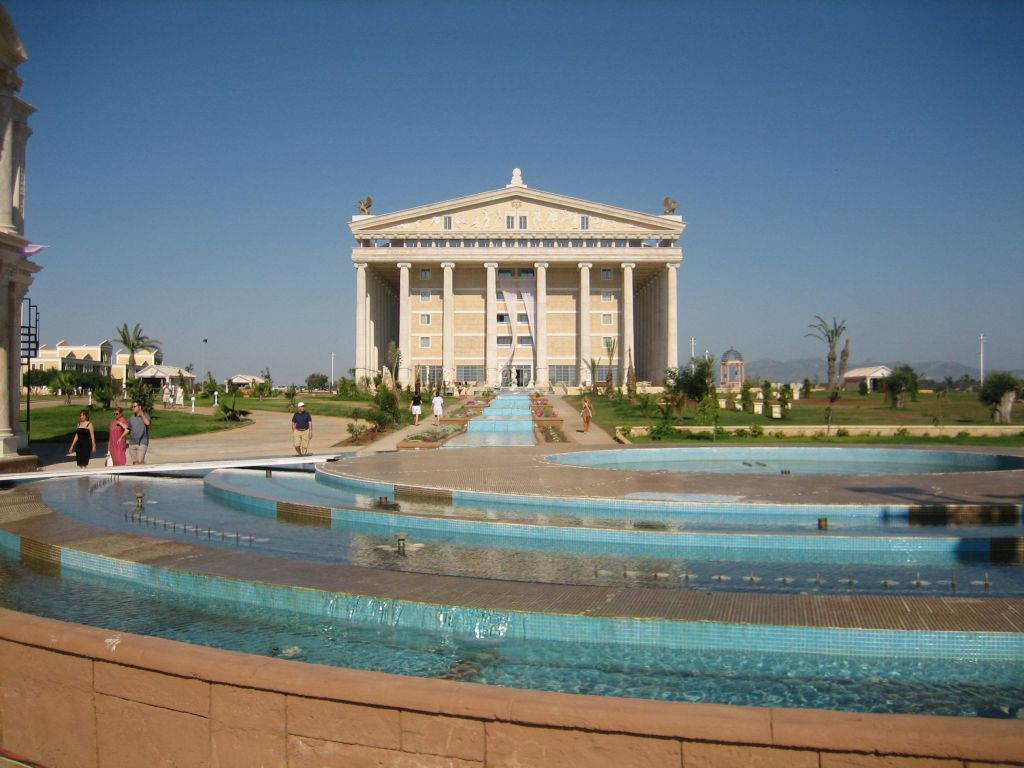
Kaya Artemis Hotel in Bafra Tourism Region

Turkey, UK and other northern European countries are the source of most tourist arrivals.

The number of tourists visiting the TRNC during January–August 2006 was 380,000, up from 286,901 during January–August 2003.

The number of tourist beds increased to 17000 in 2011. Tourism revenue in 2011 was USD400 million. The number of tourists visiting Northern Cyprus: January–August 2003: 286,901; January–August 2006: 380,000; 2010: 437,723

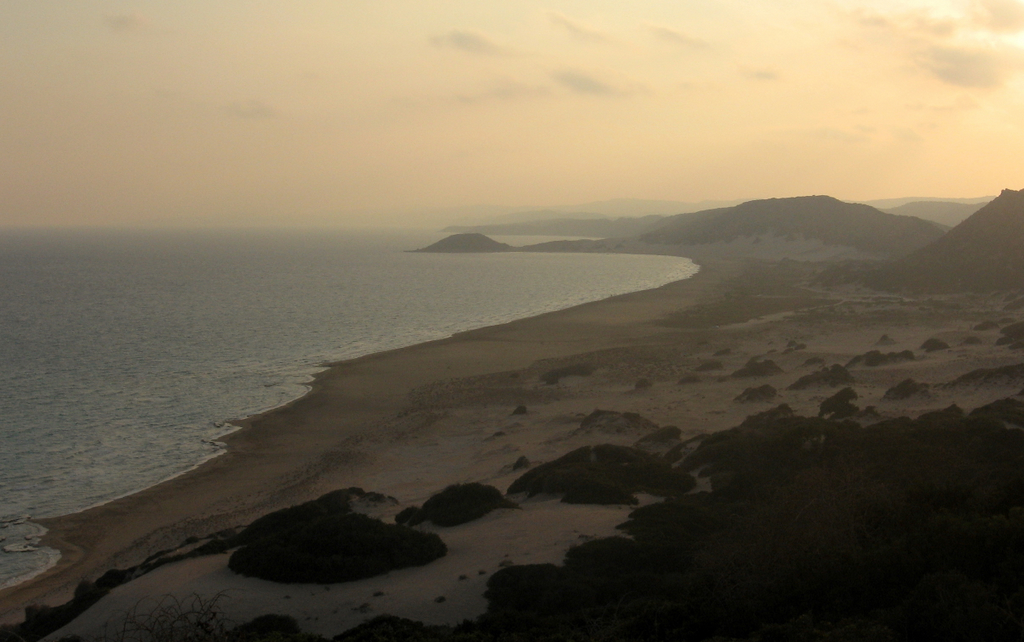
Golden Beach at Karpaz Peninsula, at sunset. The sandy beaches are often used as habitats for green turtles.

== Distribution ==
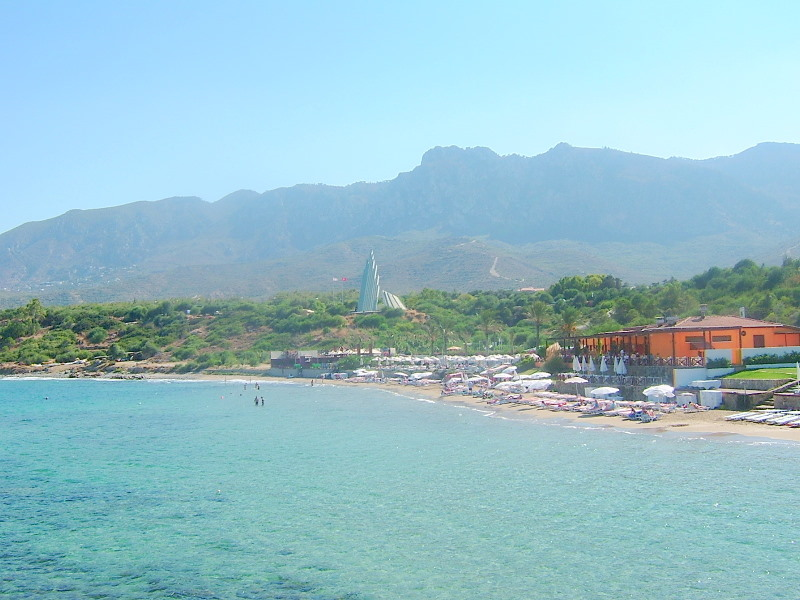
Escape Beach Club in Karavas (Alsancak), Kyrenia .

Although there are two airports in Northern Cyprus, the Ercan Airport and Geçitkale Airport, neither have been recognized due to the ongoing disputes involving the political status and recognition of Northern Cyprus. All international flights are done via Turkey by public and private airline companies.

Marina tourism also developed in recent years; Karpaz Gate Marina of Northern Cyprus became a member of ART Marine’s international marinas network in 2014.

== Capacity of tourism sector ==
Annual Tourism Revenues: As of 2012 December: 700 million USD Number of night stays: 2003: 1.3 million 2012: 2.7 million Touristic bed capacity: (2013 March) 19.867 Number of touristic establishments: (2013 March) 145 (Kyrenia: 99). 15 is 5-star-hotel, 6 is 4-star-hotel, 3 is boutique-hotel, 1 is special-certified-hotel. The total number of hotels is 84; Bungalov establishments: 33

== Marina tourism ==
Marina tourism also developed in recent years; many international yacht voyagers come to Northern Cyprus every year.

== International memberships of Northern Cyprus and its organizations in tourism ==
- Karpaz Gate Marina is a member of International Council of Marine Industry Associations (ICOMIA) since 2014.
- Karpaz Gate Marina of Northern Cyprus became a member of ART Marine’s international marinas network in 2014.
- Cyprus Turkish Tourism and Travel Agents Union is a member of United Federation of Travel Agents' Associations (UFTAA). and Global Alliance of Travel Agent Associations (GATAA)

== Photo gallery ==
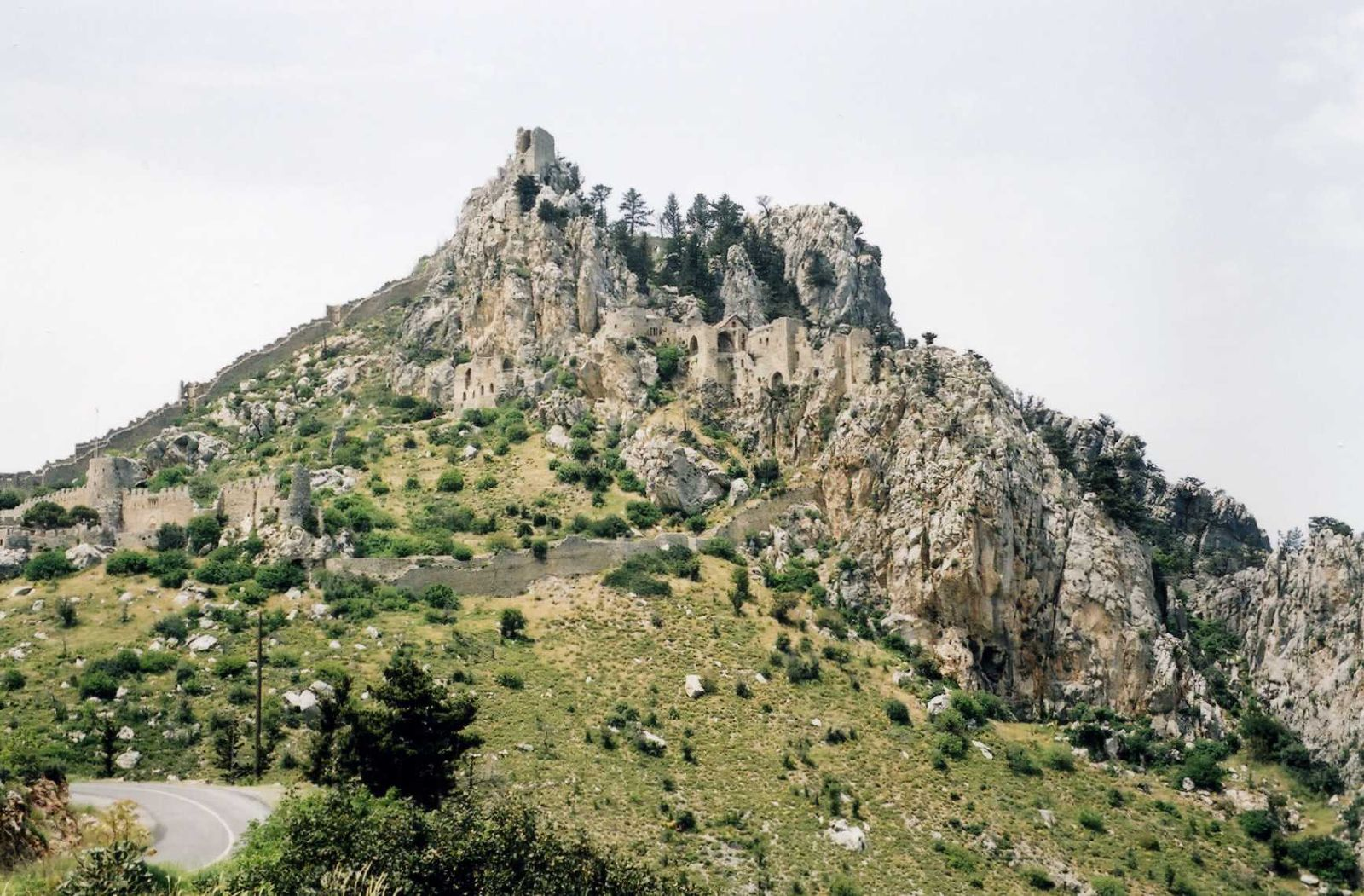
Saint Hilarion Castle

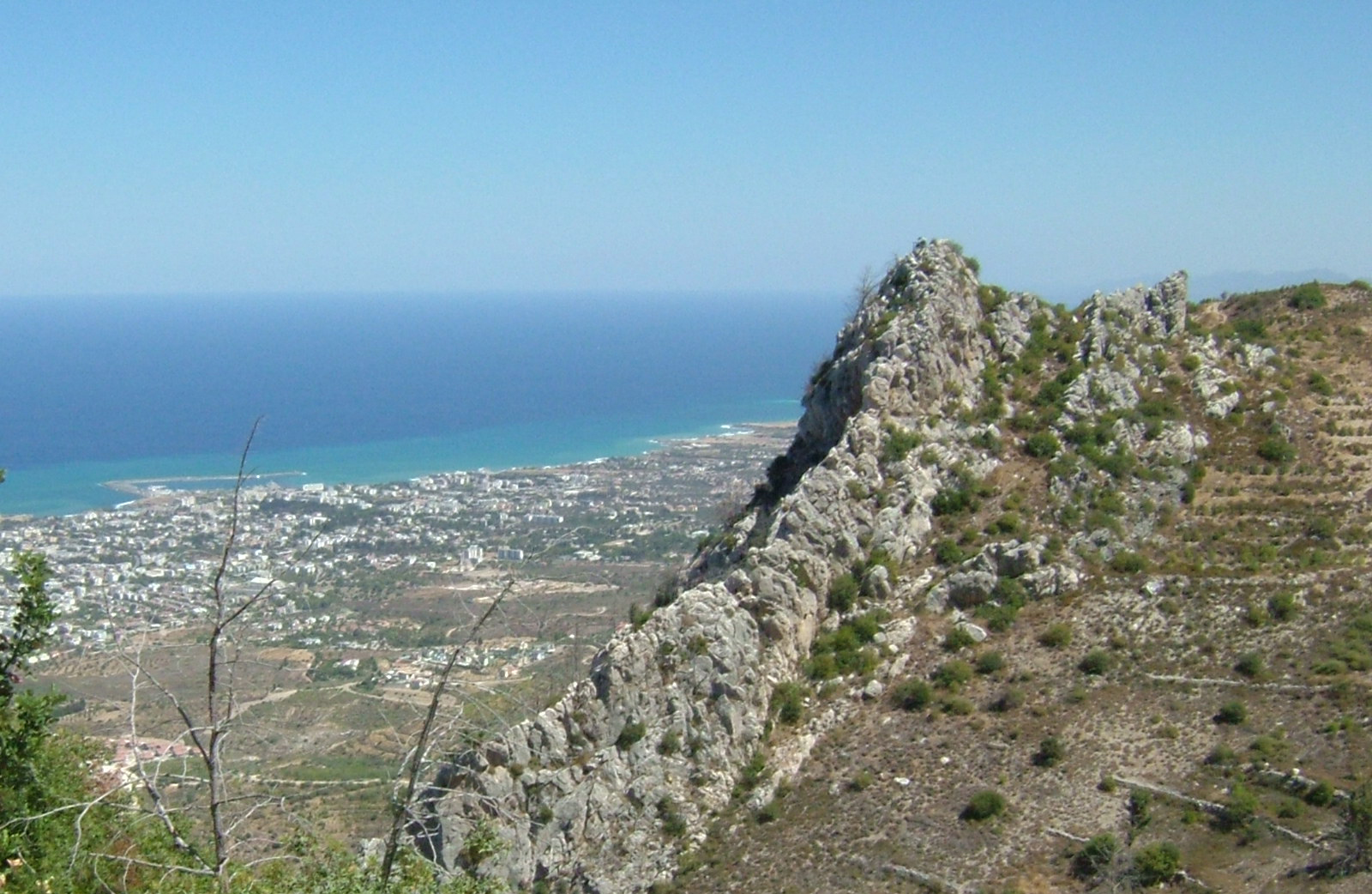
Kyrenia and the Mediterranean Sea from Saint Hilarion Castle

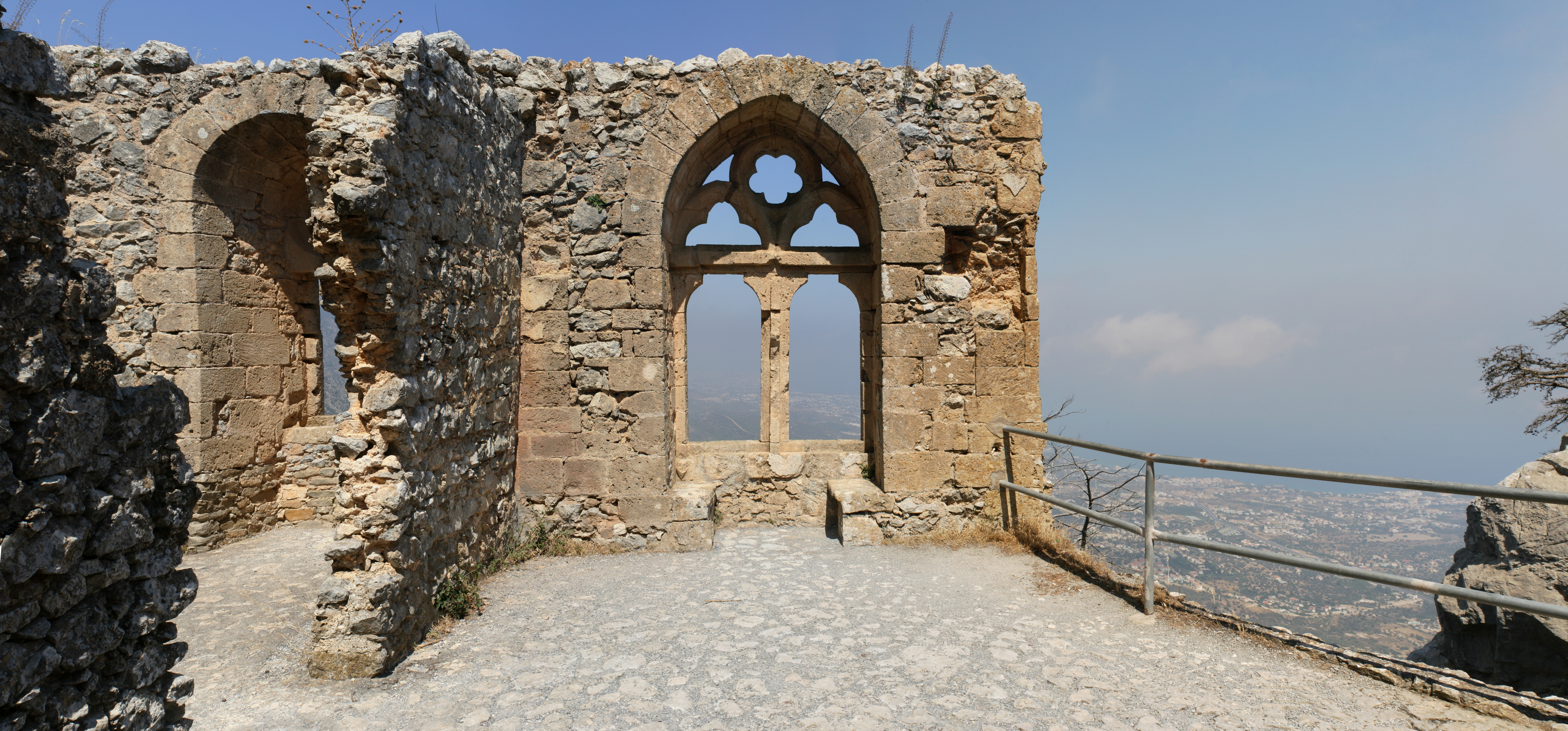
Saint Hilarion Castle, view of the Queen Elanor's window

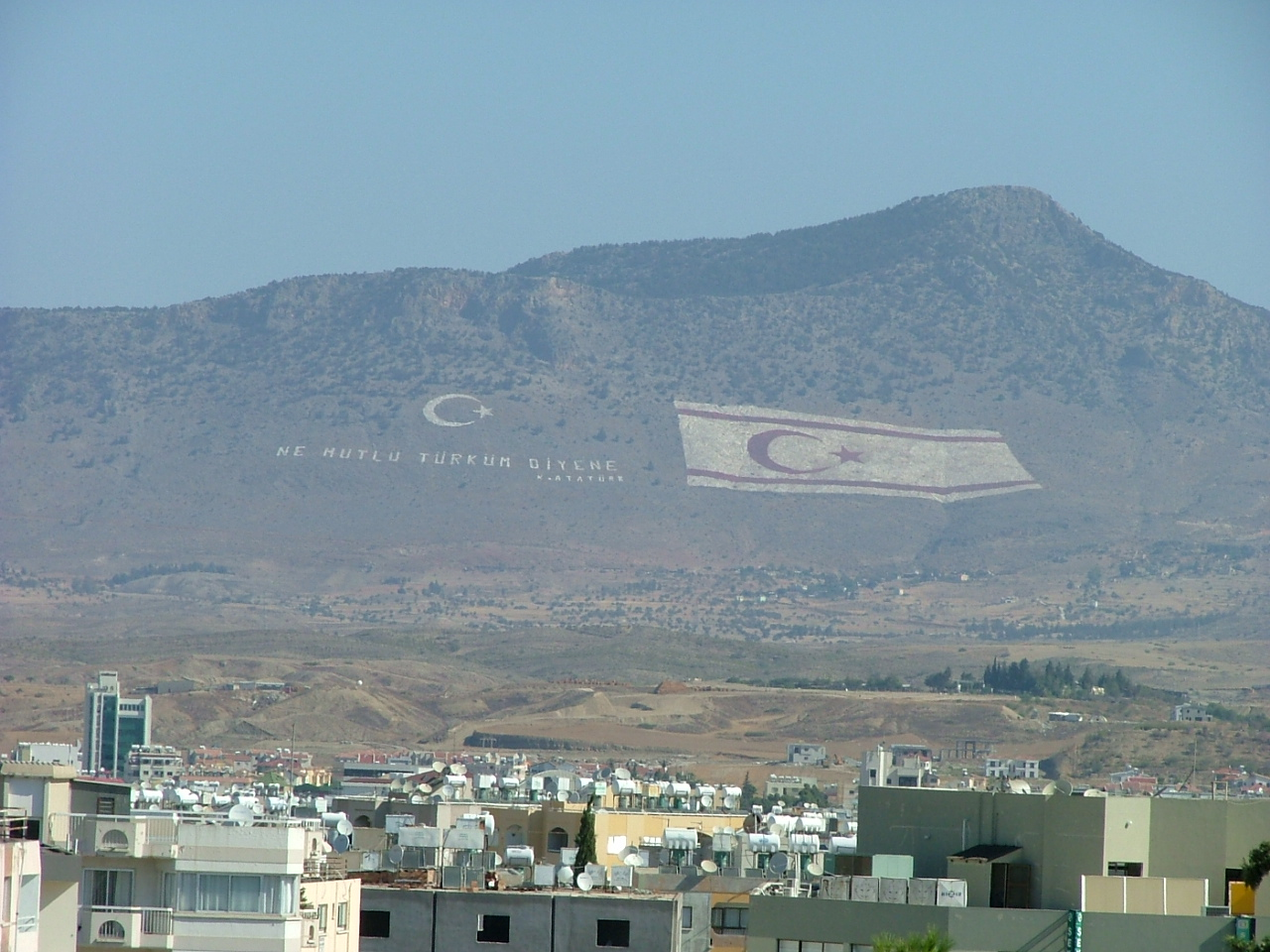
The flag of Northern Cyprus over Pentadaktylos (largest flag of the world)

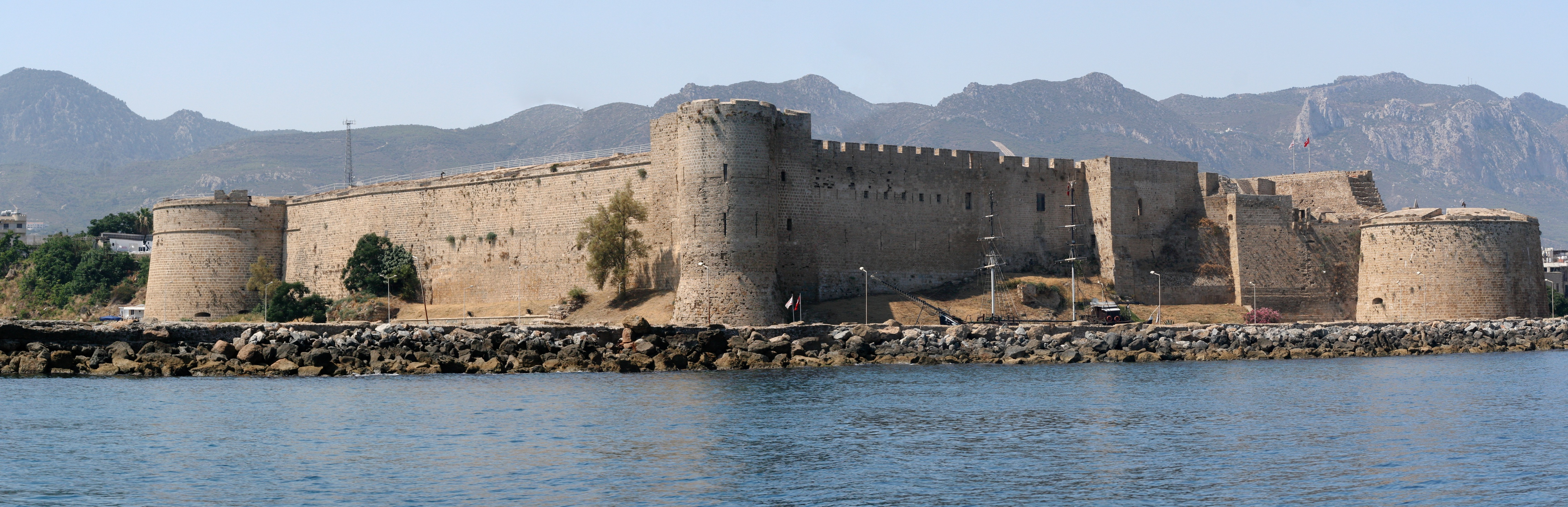
Panorama of Kyrenia Castle (Girne Kalesi)

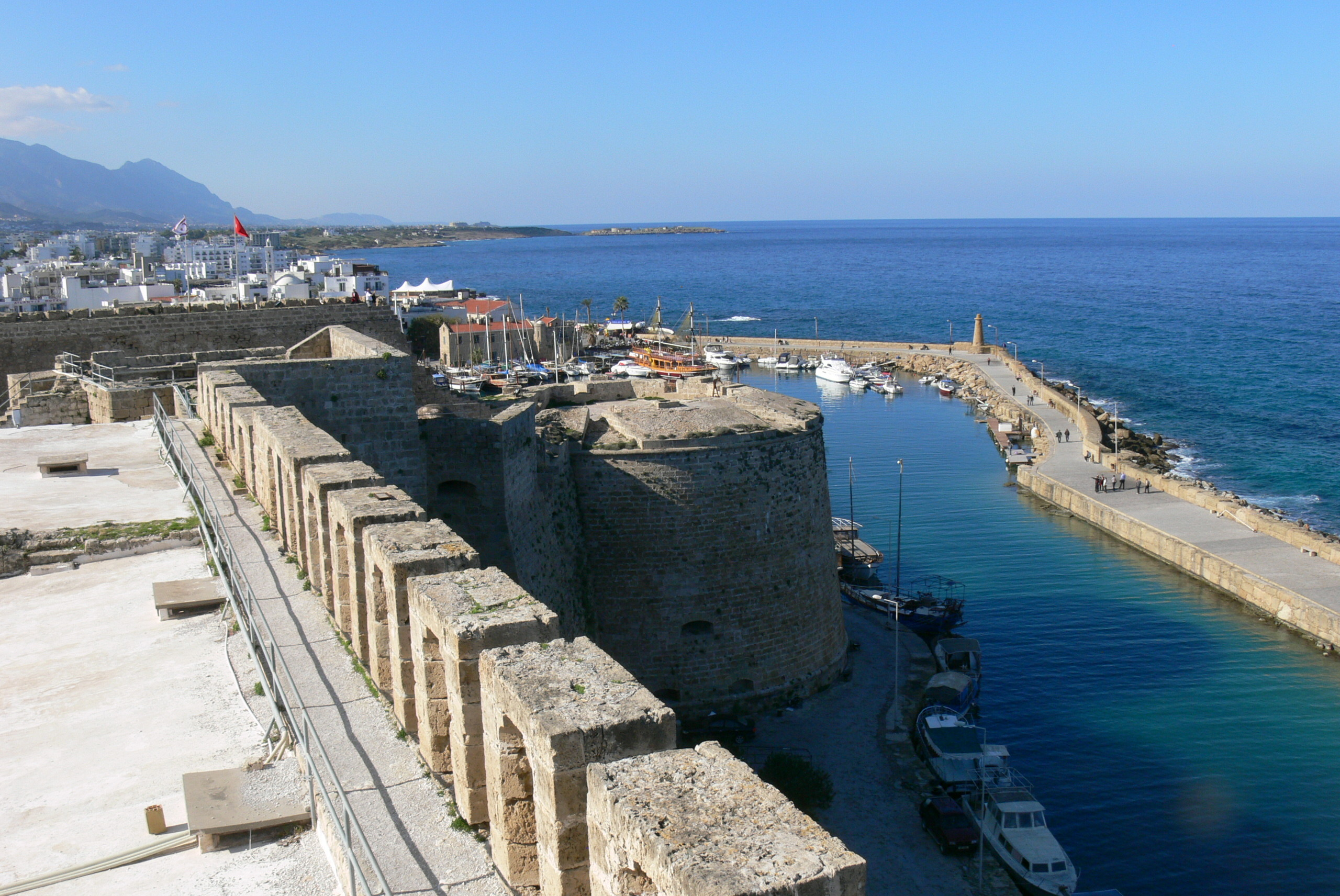
A view from the Kyrenia Castle

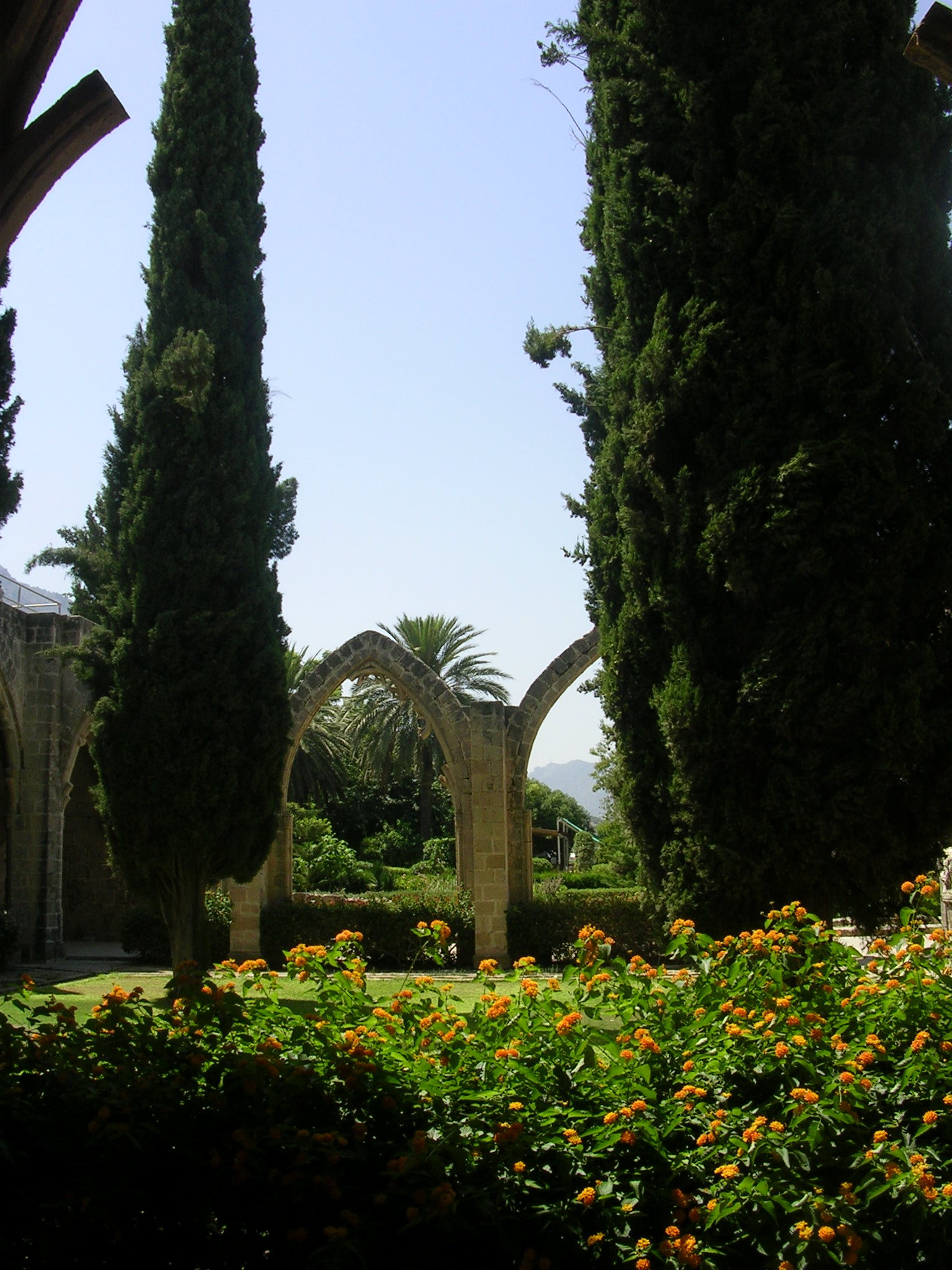
Bellapais Abbey inner court

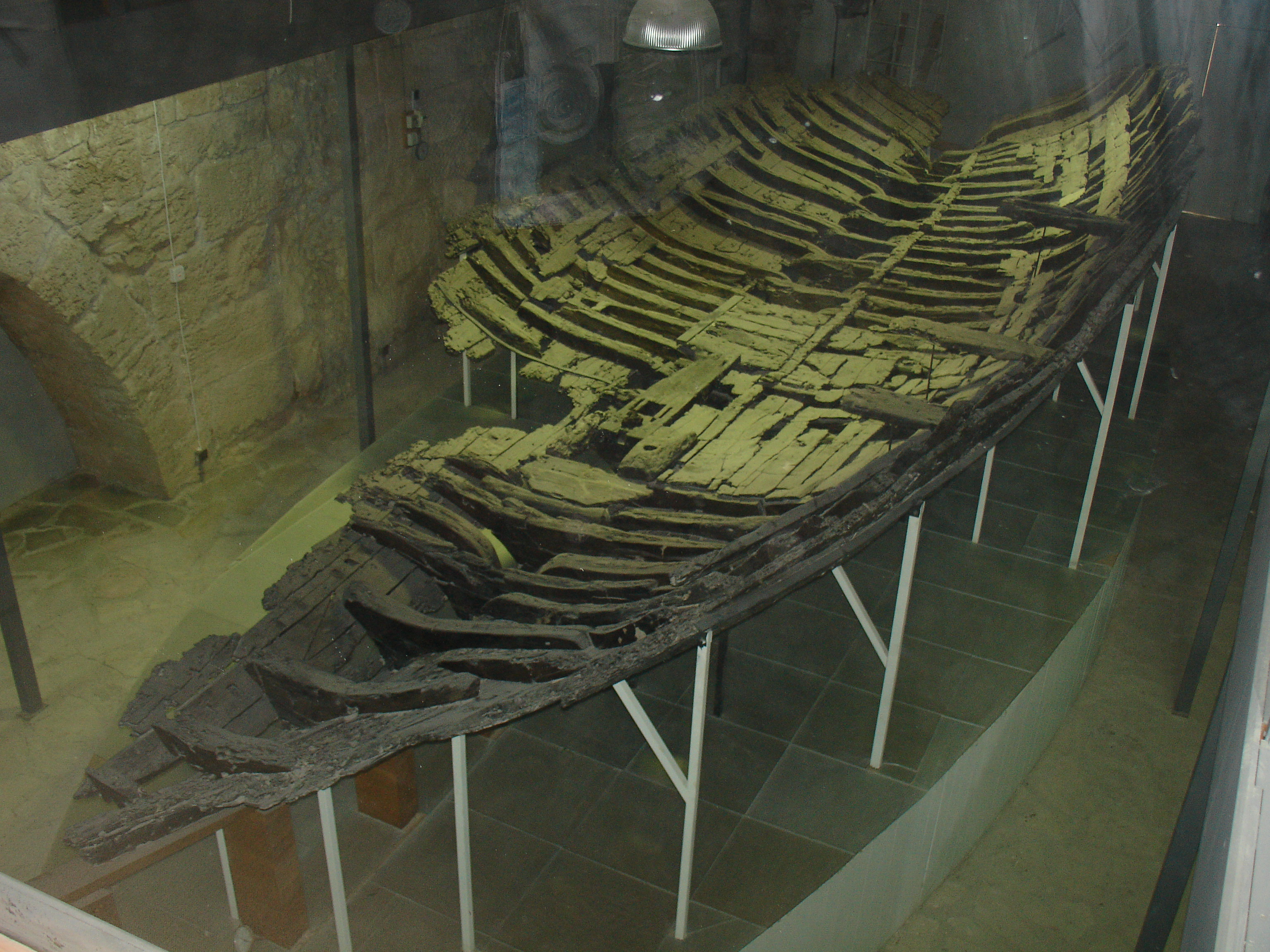
The Kyrenia Shipwreck Museum

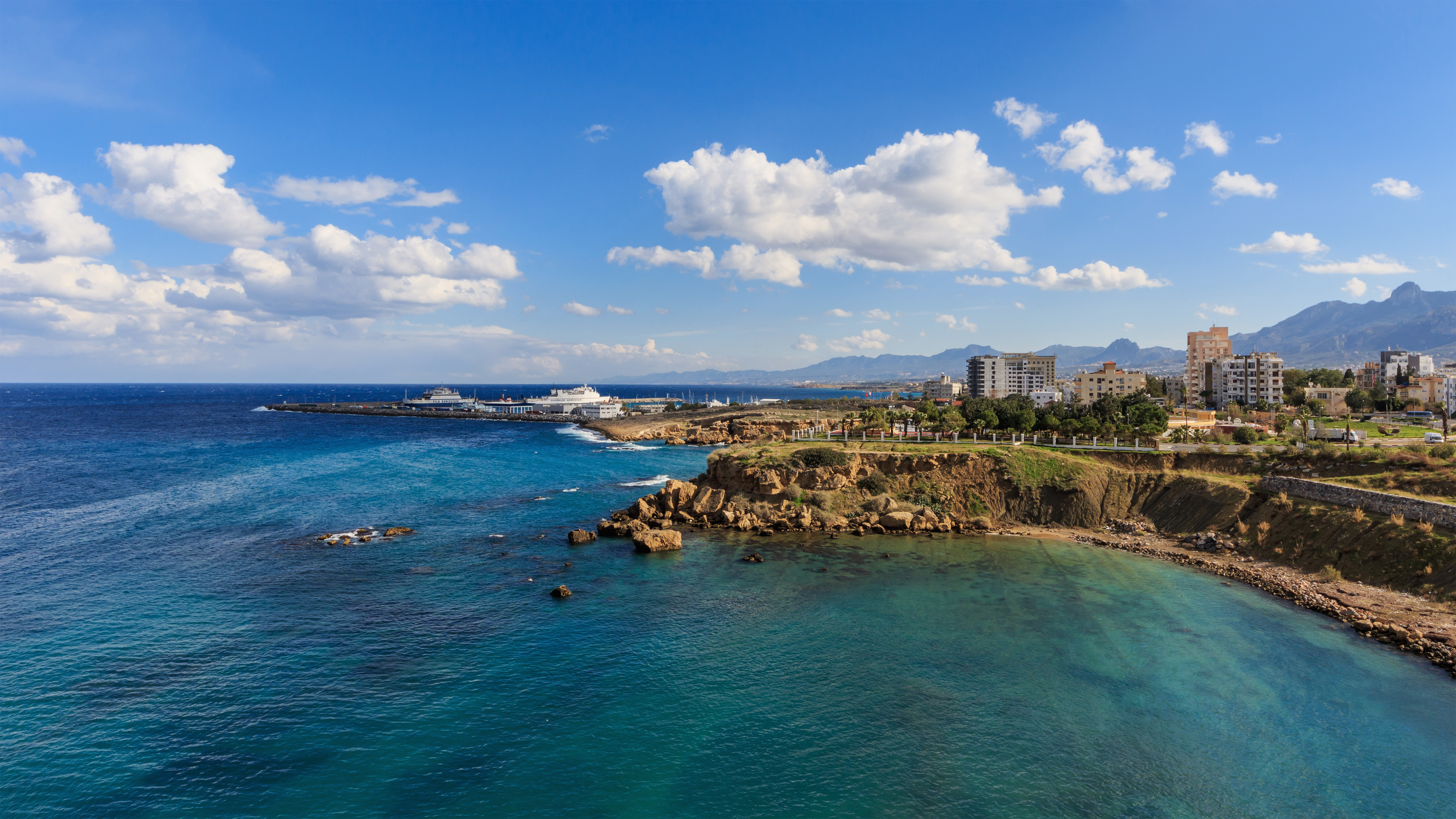
The new harbour of Kyrenia

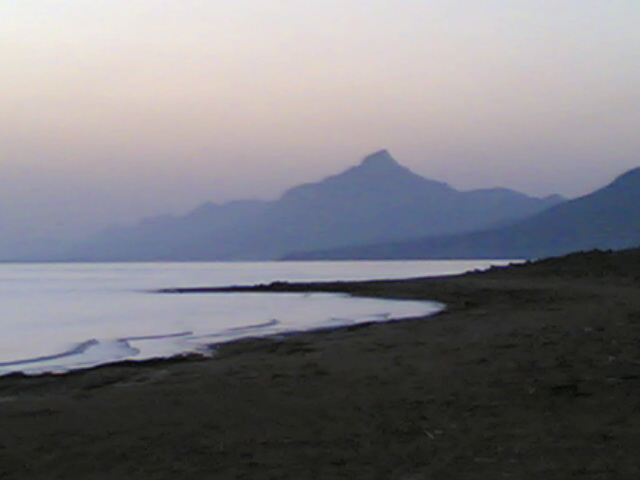
A bay near Cape Kormakitis in the west of Northern Cyprus

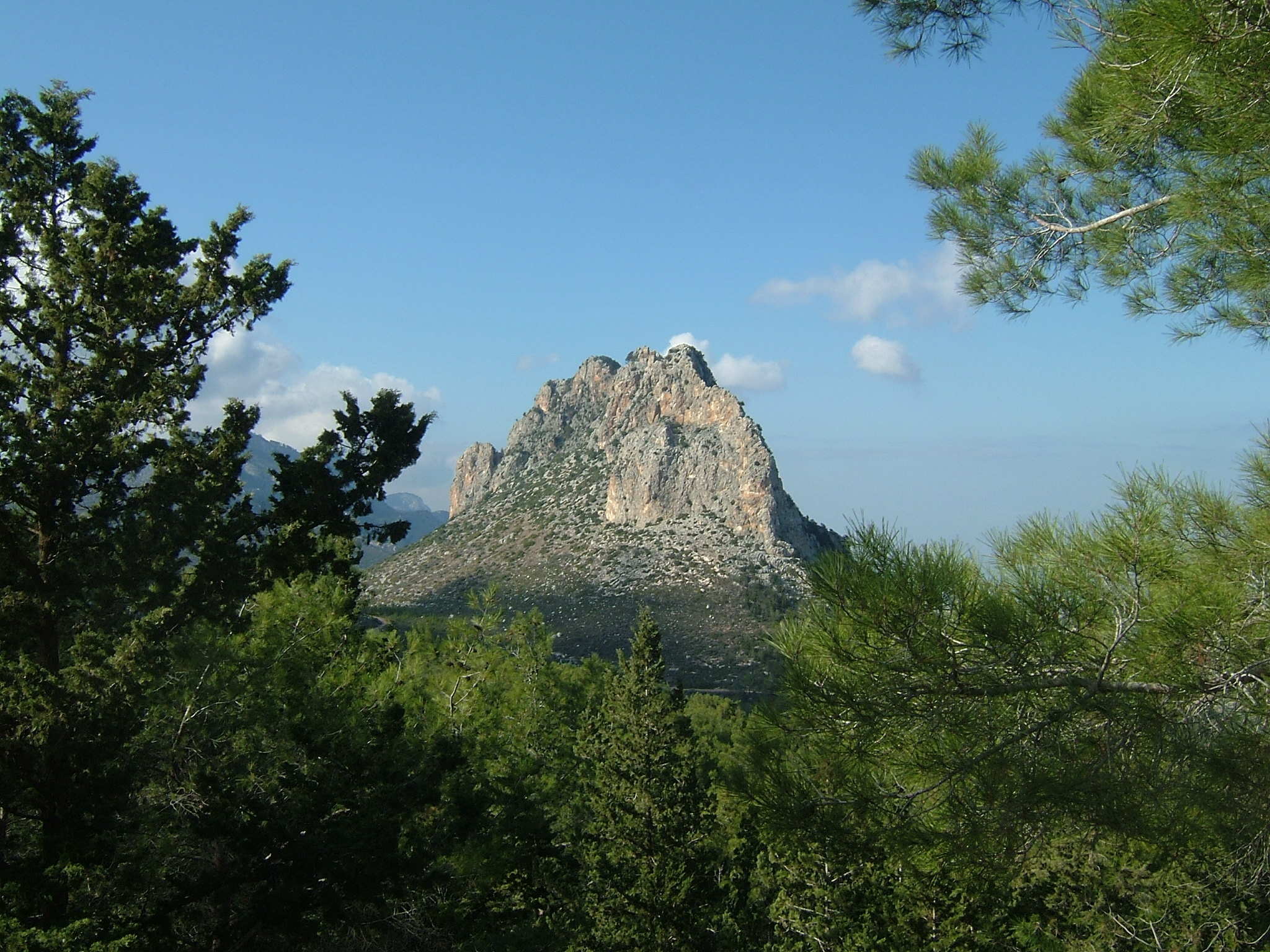
Pentadaktylos

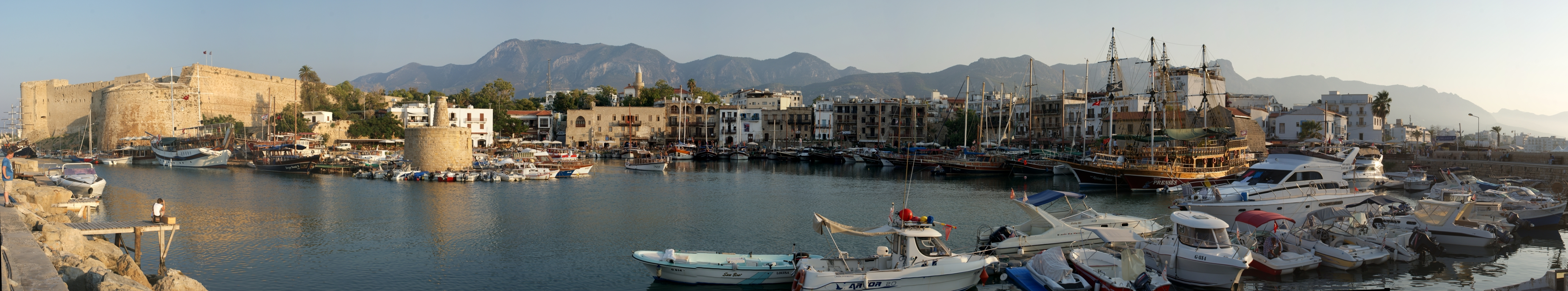
Panoramic view of the Kyrenia Harbour, with the Venetian era Kyrenia Castle on the far left, and the Kyrenia Mountains in the background.

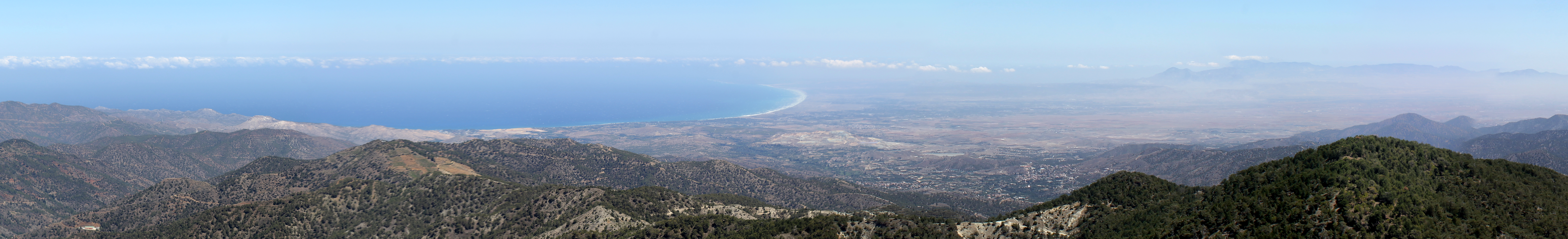
Panoramic view of the Güzelyurt District, and the Morphou Bay.

== See also ==
- Climate of Northern Cyprus
- History of Northern Cyprus
- Economy of Northern Cyprus
