= Toronto International Boat Show =

- Status: active
- Genre: Boat show
- Frequency: Annually
- Venue: Enercare Centre
- Location: Toronto
- Country: Canada
- Years active: 67
- Inaugurated: 1959
- Previous event: 2020
- Next event: 2022
- Participants: 550
- Attendance: 70,000
- Organiser: Canadian Boat Shows Inc
- Website: torontoboatshow.com

The Toronto International Boat Show is an annual boat show held in January at the Enercare Centre, at the Exhibition Place in Toronto, Ontario, Canada. It was established in 1959, and is the largest indoor show held in North America. The 2024 Toronto Boat Show runs from January 19-28, 2024, and will feature over 1,000 boats in display & over 450 exhibitors. Tickets are available on their website www.torontoboatshow.com.

In 2019, it featured 550 vendors exhibiting 1,200 boats and boating accessories. It is operated by Canadian Boat Shows Inc., which also operates the Vancouver International Boat Show.

The show features an indoor lake, described as the world's largest. It has hosted the Toronto Indoor Wakeboard Championships since 2019, which awards a cash prize and world series points for the Wakeboard World Championships.

The 2020 event had 69,530 visitors. Among its featured exhibits was Twiggy the Water-Skiing Squirrel, an Eastern gray squirrel that is prohibited by municipal bylaw regulations from being held in captivity, and thus cannot be used in "mobile educational programs" or "mobile live shows".

The Toronto International Boat Show was held virtually in January 2021 as a result of the COVID-19 pandemic in Toronto.

The 2022 annual event, scheduled to be held in-person, has been cancelled and Toronto International Boat Show 2022 will be held virtually over five days, running January 26 - 30.
