= Adriatic Boat Show =

Nautical show held in Croatia

Adriatic Boat Show ABS
- Status: Active
- Genre: Boat show
- Venue: Mandalina Harbour
- Location: Šibenik
- Country: Croatia
- Inaugurated: 2008
- Attendance: 20,000 (2008)
- Organizer: Nautical Center Prgin
- Website: www.adriaticboatshow.com

Adriatic Boat Show (ABS) is an international nautical show of new and used vessels that takes place annually in the city of Šibenik, Croatia. It is the official boat show of Croatian Boatbuilding Cluster but also includes a large number of foreign manufacturers. The Adriatic Boat Show promotes Croatian boat building as well as consolidation of the mega-yacht segment of nautical tourism in Croatia. Vessels of all size and purpose are represented – motorboats, sailboats, yachts and mega-yachts, with the presence of the all prominent motor manufacturers in the world.

== Organizer ==
NCP Group is a Croatian mother company of ten daughter companies with more than 400 employees. It is currently the fastest growing nautical company in the South-East Europe. NCP Group headquarters are on Mandalina peninsula in city of Šibenik, in Central Dalmatia. It is located between two national parks – Krka and Kornati. This region is often mentioned as the most attractive part of the Adriatic coast and an area that National Geographic magazine stated among the world's most attractive nautical destinations.

== Mandalina Marina – first Croatian megayacht marina ==
During the Adriatic Boat Show, the official ceremony of opening the first phase of construction site of Marina Mandalina for mega-yachts will be held. It is expected that by summer 2011 Mandalina Marina & Yacht Club' will be able to accept 79 yachts (up to 100 meters in length) and provide them complete service.

== See also ==
- Kornati National Park
