= American Boat and Yacht Council =

- Abbreviation: ABYC
- Formation: 1954
- Founder: The Motorboat and Yacht Advisory Panel of the U.S. Coast Guard's Merchant Marine Council
- Type: Nonprofit
- Purpose: Global safety standards for recreational boats
- Headquarters: Annapolis, Maryland
- Services: Safety standards, credentialing, education, training
- Members: 4000+
- Affiliations: International Organization for Standardization (ISO)
- Website: abycinc.org

The American Boat and Yacht Council (ABYC) is a United States–based non-profit, member-supported organization that helps develop voluntary safety standards for the design, construction, maintenance, and repair of recreational boats across the world.

== Establishment ==
The ABYC was established in 1954 by members of the Motorboat and Yacht Advisory Panel of the U.S. Coast Guard's Merchant Marine Council after a surge of popularity in recreational boating in the 1950s. The organization joined the American National Standards Institute (ANSI) shortly after its creation.

ABYC has over 4000 members that include boat owners, equipment manufacturers, retail marine stores, service technicians, surveyors, and boat builders.

== Works ==
The ABYC frequently holds seminars, workshops, and technical certification courses for members.
