= Boat show =

Public exhibition or trade fair

A boat show is a public exhibition or trade fair of current boat models, debuts, concept vessels, or out-of-production classics. Due to the nature of the industry building around yachting and nautical tourism, a boat show may be a social event. Marine manufacturers, ship and boat builders, and yachters commonly attend.

Most boat shows occur once a year, typically for the duration of a week. They may have exhibitions on land or on water. Boat shows are vital to marine manufacturers and local dealers as a public relations exercise, for advertising products, and for increasing publicity.

== List of boat shows ==
The boat shows listed below are members of the International Federation of Boat Show Organisers (IFBSO):

Location	Show	Exhibition Space	# Exhibitors	# Foreign exh. thereof	# Visitors	data as of
Athens, Greece	Athens International Boat Show	50,000 m^{2}	287	7	89,897	2009
Barcelona, Spain	Barcelona International Boat Show	110,000 m^{2}	387	64	17,907	2009
Brisbane, Australia	Brisbane International Boat Show	110,000 m^{2}	387	64	17,907	1961
Dubai, United Arab Emirates	Dubai International Boat Show	85,000 m^{2}	702	247	23,000	2010
Düsseldorf, Messe, Germany	boot Düsseldorf	220,000 m^{2}	1,577	677	240,200	2010
Fort Lauderdale, Florida, United States	Fort Lauderdale International Boat Show	278,700 m^{2}	986	132	117,200	2008
Friedrichshafen, Germany	Interboot - International Watersports Exhibition	67,000 m^{2}	512	123	93,800	2009
Genoa, Italy	Genoa International Boat Show	311,000 m^{2}	1,450	560	280,500	2009
Gothenburg, Sweden	Gothenburg Boat Show	32,950 m^{2}	344	12	77,124	2010
Hamburg, Germany	hanseboot - International Boat Show Hamburg	85,274 m^{2}	765	124	96,059	2008
Helsinki, Finland	Helsinki International Boat Show	44,000 m^{2}	345	8	74,551	2010
Lisbon, Portugal	Lisbon Boat Show	30,000 m^{2}	340	54	79,664	2009
London, England, United Kingdom	London Boat Show	52,000 m^{2}	520	40	103,000	2010
Miami, Florida, United States	Miami International Boat Show	225,430 m^{2}	2,000	41	91,415	2010
Portorož, Lucija, Slovenia	Internautica, International Boat Show	37,400 m^{2}	386	221	19,479	2010
Shanghai, PR China	Shanghai International Boat Show	32,000 m^{2}	400	98	15,287	2010
Southampton, England, United Kingdom	Southampton Boat Show	154,000 m^{2}	560	86	122,000	2009
Split, Croatia	Croatia Boat Show	128,000 m^{2}	382	117	37,400	2009
Stockholm, Sweden	Stockholm International Boat Show	65,000 m^{2}	472	31	104,657	2010
Sydney, Australia	Sydney International Boat Show	25,000 m^{2}	263	7	71,810	2009
Gyeonggi-do, South Korea	Korea International Boat Show	32,150 m^{2}	240	40	40,000	2016
Yokohama, Japan	Japan International Boat Show (Japanese)	16,740 m^{2}	170	8	42,000	2010

The boat shows that are not members of the International Federation of Boat Show Organisers (IFBSO):

Location	Show
Cancun, Mexico	Cancun International Boat Show
Monaco	Monaco Yacht Show
El Alamein, Egypt	El Alamein International Boat Show
Antibes, France	Antibes Yacht Show
Cannes, France	Festival de la Plaisance de Cannes
Toronto, Canada	Toronto International Boat Show
Amsterdam, the Netherlands	Hiswa te Water
Palm Beach, USA	Palm Beach Boat Show
Nafplion, Greece	Mediterranean Boat Show
Abu Dhabi, UAE	Abu Dhabi Boat Show
Togliatti, Russia	Volga Boat Show
Antigua	Antigua Boat Show
