= International Council of Marine Industry Associations =

International Council of Marine Industry Associations (ICOMIA)

The International Council of Marine Industry Associations (ICOMIA, founded 1966) is a non-profit international trade association that brings together national recreational marine industry associations and represents them at an international level. ICOMIA has currently 35 full members representing virtually all countries with an active recreational marine industry in Europe, North America, Asia and Australia.

ICOMIA publishes documents and guidelines to facilitate the growth of the global recreational marine industry. One of ICOMIA’s on-going projects is the Global Conformity Guidelines, which are produced in association with the American Boat and Yacht Council (ABYC), British Marine Federation (BMF), National Marine Manufacturers Association (NMMA) and International Marine Certification Institute (IMCI).

The purpose of the Global Conformity Guidelines is to assist boat builders who comply with either ABYC or ISO standard systems, but are looking to start exporting to countries using the opposite system. So far, ICOMIA has published seven guidelines including Fuel Systems, Powering and Windows, Portlights and Hatches in the ICOMIA Online Library. The final goal of the Global Conformity Guidelines is to resolve the differences between the two standards and achieve one global technical specification.

Equally important to mention are the annual ICOMIA industry statistics, which are produced annually with numbers from their global membership.

In addition to publishing guidelines and other valuable documents, ICOMIA is directly involved with a number of international events. In partnership with Amsterdam RAI, the annual marine equipment trade show METS has become the global market place for equipment manufacturers.
