= Figg =

Figg is a surname. Notable people with the name include:

- Christopher Figg (born 1957), English film producer
- Eugene Figg (1936–2002), American structural engineer
- George Figg (1824–1888), English cricketer
- James Figg (before 1700–1734), English bare-knuckle boxer
- William Douglas Figg, Sr. (born 1963) American pharmacologist

== Fictional characters ==
- Arabella Figg, a Harry Potter character
- Pristine Figg, the antagonist of Tom and Jerry: The Movie, voiced by Charlotte Rae

== See also ==
- Fig (disambiguation)
- Figgs (disambiguation)
