= Varosha, Famagusta =

Varosha Βαρώσi (Greek) Maraş (Turkish)
- Varosha
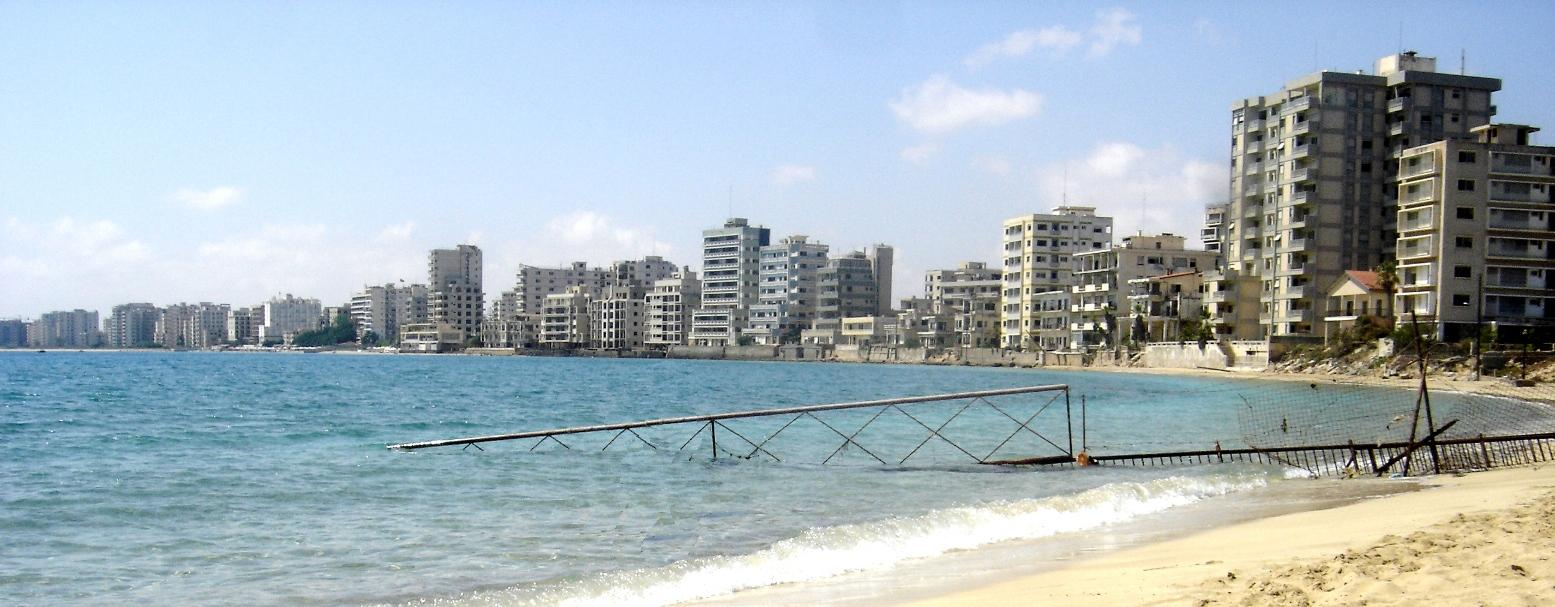
- Varosha in 2006

- Location within Cyprus
- Coordinates: 35°06′39″N 33°57′13″E
- Country (de jure): Cyprus
  - District: Famagusta District
- Country (de facto): Northern Cyprus
  - District: Gazimağusa District

Population (2011)
  - Total: 226(Census of Northern Cyprus); 39,000 (at peak)

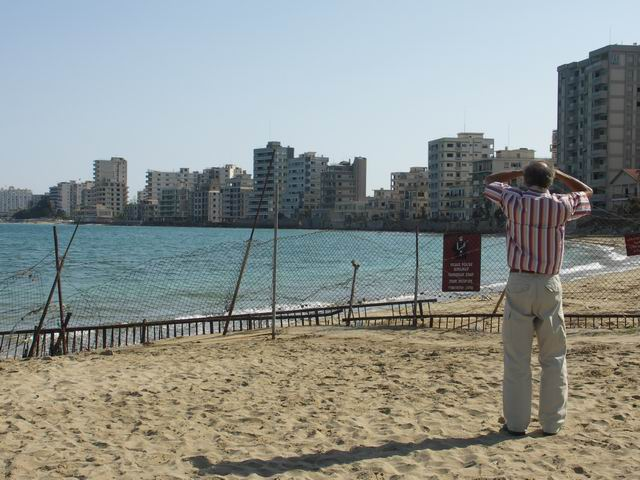
Varosha, as seen from outside the military fence

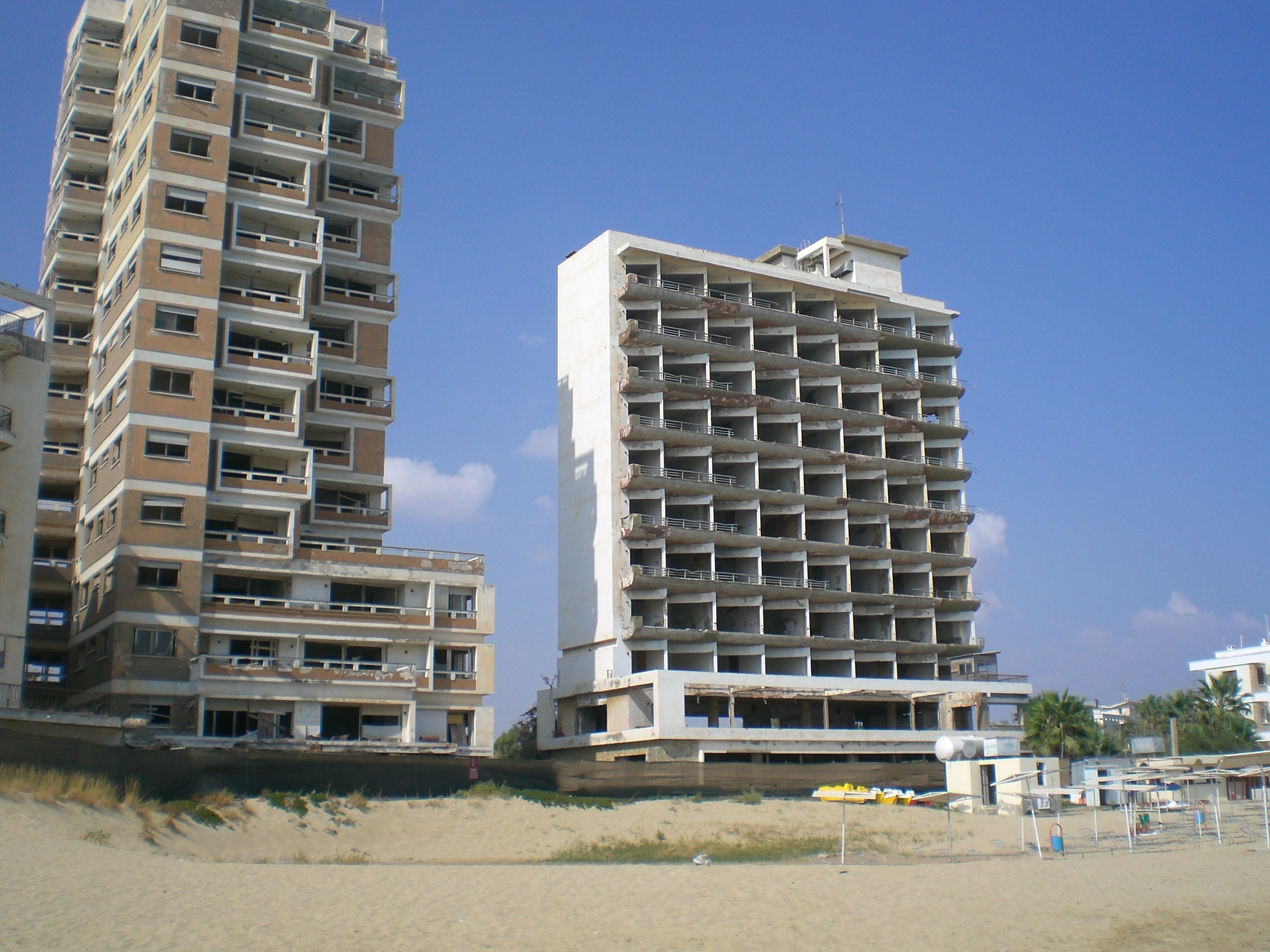
Abandoned hotels in Varosha

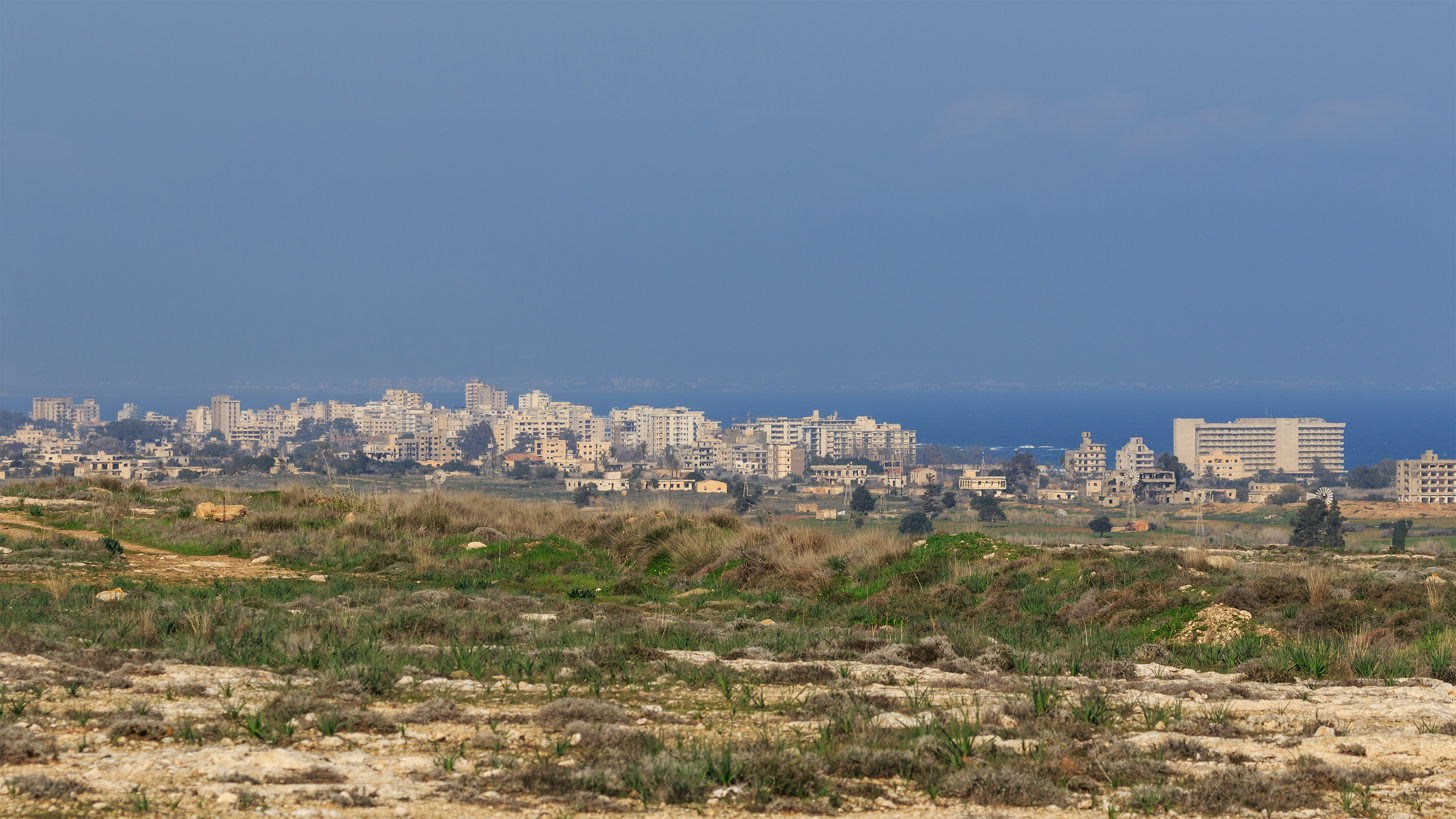
Varosha viewed from Paralimni in 2017.

Varosha (Greek: Βαρώσι, romanized: Varósi, locally [vaˈɾoʃa]; Turkish: Maraş [maˈɾaʃ] or Kapalı Maraş) is the southern quarter of Famagusta, a de jure territory of Cyprus, currently under the control of Northern Cyprus. Varosha had a population of 226 in the 2011 Northern Cyprus census. The area of Varosha is 6.19 km^{2} (2.39 sq mi).

== Etymology ==
The name of Varosha derives from the Turkish word varoş (Ottoman Turkish: واروش, 'suburb'). The place where Varosha is located was once fields in which animals grazed.

== History ==
In the early 1970s, Famagusta was the top tourist destination in Cyprus. To cater to the increasing number of tourists, many new high-rise buildings and hotels were constructed. During its heyday, between 1970 and 1974, Varosha was one of the most popular tourist destinations in the world and was a favorite destination of such celebrities as Elizabeth Taylor, Richard Burton, Raquel Welch, and Brigitte Bardot.

Before 1974, Varosha was the modern tourist area of the Famagusta city. Its Greek Cypriot inhabitants fled during the Turkish invasion of Cyprus in 1974, when the city of Famagusta came under Turkish control, and it has remained abandoned ever since. In 1984, a United Nations resolution called for the handover of the city to UN control and said that only the original inhabitants, who were forced out, could resettle in the town.

Entry to part of Varosha was opened to civilians in 2017.

== Turkish Cypriot rule ==
In August 1974, the Turkish Army advanced as far as the Green Line, a UN-patrolled demilitarized zone between the Greek Cypriots and Turkish Cypriots, and controlled and fenced Varosha. Just hours before the Greek Cypriot and Turkish Armies met in combat on the streets of Famagusta, the entire Greek Cypriot population fled to Paralimni, Dherynia and Larnaca. The evacuation was aided and orchestrated by the nearby British military base. Paralimni has since become the modern-day capital of the Famagusta province of Greek Cypriot-led Cyprus.

The Turkish Army has allowed the entry of only Turkish military and United Nations personnel since 2017.

One such settlement plan was the Annan Plan to reunify the island; it provided for the return of Varosha to the original residents but was rejected by Greek Cypriots in a 2004 referendum. UN Security Council Resolution 550 states that it "considers attempts to settle any part of Varosha by people other than its inhabitants as inadmissible and calls for the transfer of this area to the administration of the United Nations".

The European Court of Human Rights awarded between €100,000 and €8,000,000 to eight Greek Cypriots for being deprived of their homes and properties as a result of the 1974 invasion. The case was filed jointly by businessman Constantinos Lordos and others, with the principal judgement in the Lordos case dating back to November 2010. The court ruled that in the case of eight of the applicants, Turkey had violated Article 1 of Protocol 1 of the European Convention on Human Rights on the right of peaceful enjoyment of one's possessions, and in the case of seven of the applicants, Turkey had violated Article 8 on the right to respect for private and family life.

In the absence of human habitation and maintenance, buildings continue to decay. Over time, parts of the city have begun to be reclaimed by nature as metal corrodes, windows are broken, and plants work their roots into the walls and pavement and grow wild in old window boxes. In 2014, the BBC reported that sea turtles were observed nesting on the beaches in the city.

During the years the city has gone under extensive looting. In the buildings now visible on the visitor's area it's evident the absence of furniture and even of power sockets, switches and ceiling lamps and all doors appear to have been broken in.

During the Cyprus Missile Crisis (1997–1998), the Turkish Cypriot leader, Rauf Denktaş, threatened to take over Varosha if the Cypriot government did not back down.

== Features ==
The main features of Varosha included John F. Kennedy Avenue, a street that ran from close to the port of Famagusta, through Varosha and parallel to Glossa beach. Along JFK Avenue, there were many well known high-rise hotels including the King George Hotel, The Asterias Hotel, The Grecian Hotel, The Florida Hotel, and The Argo Hotel which was the favourite hotel of Elizabeth Taylor. The Argo Hotel is located near the end of John F. Kennedy Avenue, looking towards Protaras and Fig Tree Bay. Another major street in Varosha was Leonidas (Greek: Λεωνίδας), a major street that came off John F. Kennedy Avenue and headed west towards Vienna Corner. Leonidas was a major shopping and leisure street in Varosha, consisting of bars, restaurants, nightclubs, and a Toyota car dealership.

== Court cases ==
According to Greek Cypriots, 425 plots exist on the Varosha beach front, which extends from the Contandia hotel to the Golden Sands hotel. The total number of plots in Varosha is 6082.

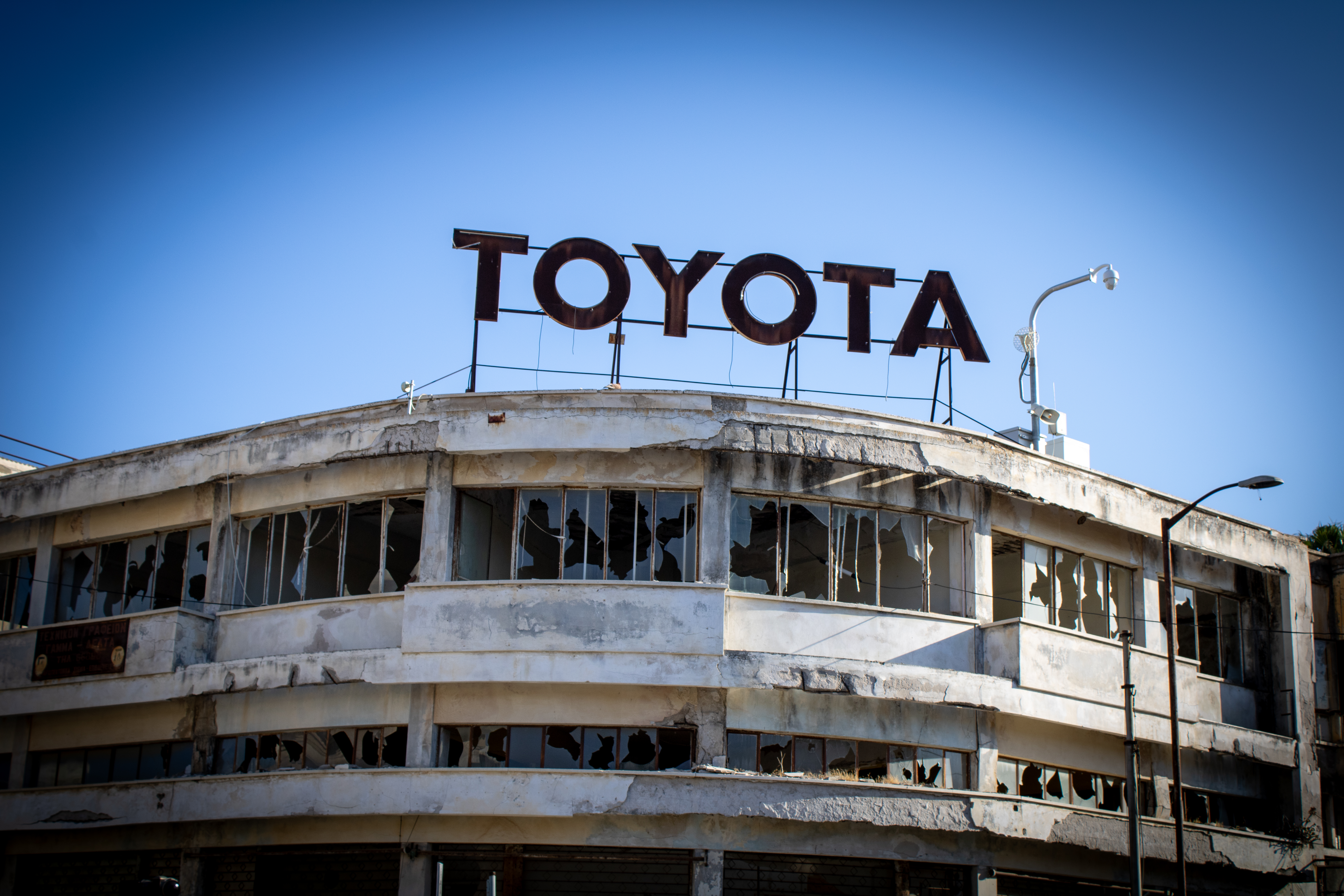
Toyota building in Varosha, 2024.

There are 281 cases of Greek Cypriots who filed to the Immovable Property Commission (IPC) of Northern Cyprus for compensation.

In 2020, a Greek Cypriot, Demetrios Hadjihambis, filed a lawsuit seeking state compensation for financial losses.

== Reopening to civilian inhabitation ==
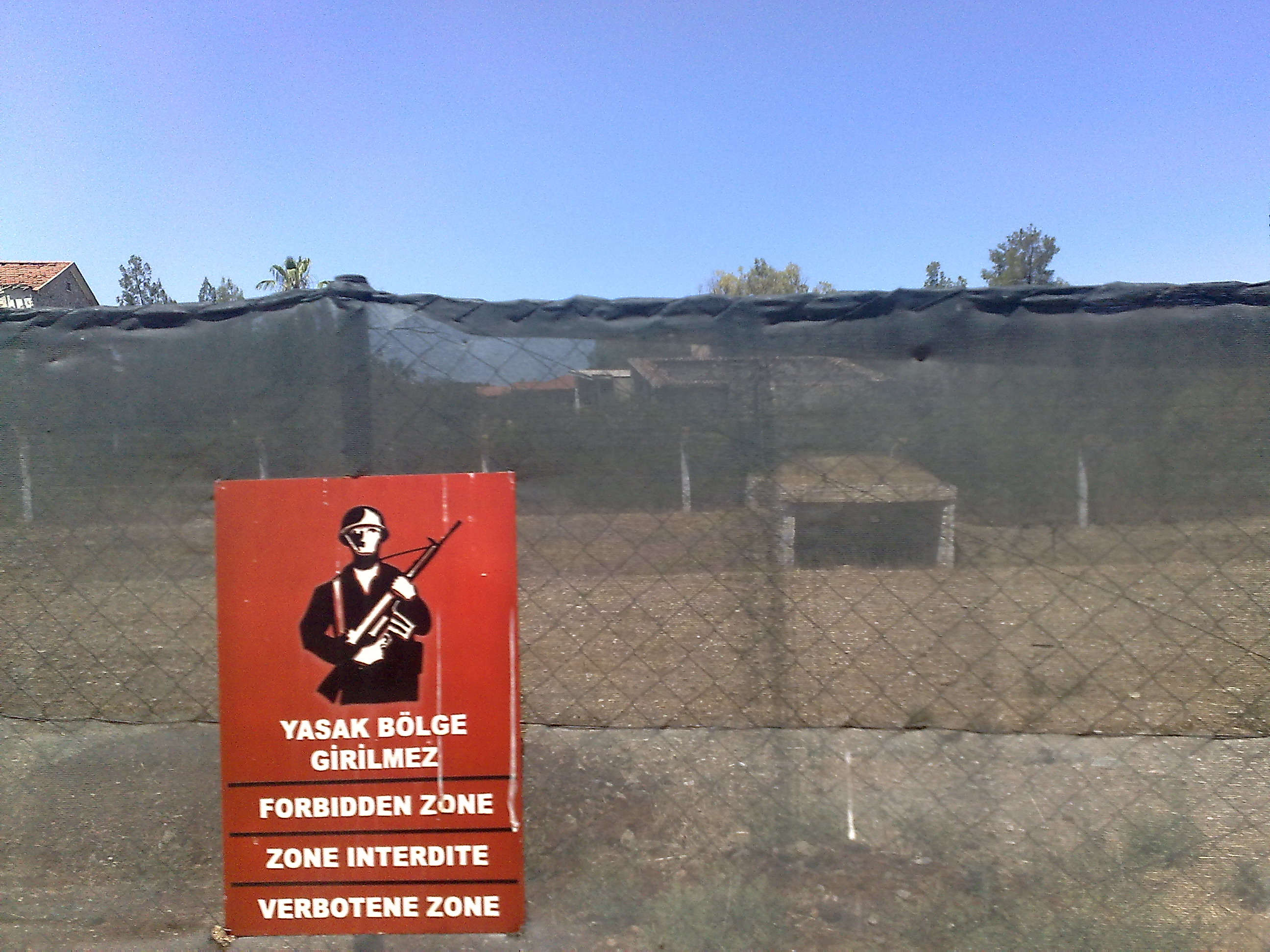
Varosha (Turkish: Maraş) under blockade by the Turkish Army.

The population of Varosha was 226 in the 2011 Northern Cyprus census.

In 2017, Varosha's beach was opened for the exclusive use by Turks (both Turkish Cypriots and Turkish nationals).

In 2019, the Government of Northern Cyprus announced it would open Varosha to settlement. On 14 November 2019, Ersin Tatar, the prime minister of Northern Cyprus, announced that Northern Cyprus aims to open Varosha by the end of 2020.

On 25 July 2019, Varosha Inventory Commission of Northern Cyprus started its inventory analysis on the buildings and other infrastructure in Varosha.

On 9 December 2019, Ibrahim Benter, the Director-General of the Turkish Cypriot EVKAF religious foundation's administration, declared all of Varosha to be the property of EVKAF. Benter said "EVKAF can sign renting contracts with Greek Cypriots if they accept that the fenced-off town belongs to the Evkaf."

In 2019 and 2020, inventory studies of buildings by the Government of Northern Cyprus were concluded. On 15 February 2020, the Turkish Bar Association organised a round table meeting at the Sandy Beach Hotel in Varosha, which was attended by Turkish officials (Vice-President Fuat Oktay and Justice Minister Abdulhamit Gül), Turkish Cypriot officials, representatives of the Turkish Cypriot religious foundation Evkaf, and Turkish and Turkish Cypriot lawyers.

On 22 February 2020, Cyprus declared it would veto European Union funds to Turkish Cypriots if Varosha were opened to settlement.

On 6 October 2020, Ersin Tatar, the Prime Minister of Northern Cyprus, announced that the beach area of Varosha would reopen to the public on 8 October 2020. Turkish President Recep Tayyip Erdoğan, said Turkey fully supported the decision. The move came ahead of the 2020 Northern Cypriot presidential election in which Tatar was a candidate. Deputy Prime Minister Kudret Özersay, who had worked on the reopening previously, said that was not a full reopening of the area but was just a unilateral election stunt by Tatar. His People's Party withdrew from the Tatar cabinet, which led to the collapse of the Turkish Cypriot government.

The EU diplomatic chief condemned the plan and described it as a "serious violation" of the UN ceasefire agreement. In addition, he asked Turkey to stop the activity. The UN Secretary-General expressed concern over Turkey's decision.

On 8 October 2020, parts of Varosha were opened from the Officers' Club of Turkish and Turkish Cypriot Army to the Golden Sands Hotel.

In November 2020, Erdoğan and Turkey's ambassador to Nicosia visited Varosha. In addition, the main avenue in Varosha has been renamed after Semih Sancar, Chief of the General Staff of Turkey from 1973 to 1978, a period including the 1974 Turkish invasion of Cyprus.

The European Parliament on 27 November asked Turkey to reverse its decision to reopen part of Varosha and to resume negotiations aimed at resolving the Cyprus problem on the basis of a bi-communal, bi-zonal federation and called on the European Union to impose sanctions against Turkey, if things did not change. Turkey rejected the resolution and added that Turkey would continue to protect both its own rights and those of Turkish Cypriots. Northern Cyprus also condemned the resolution.

On 20 July 2021, Tatar announced the start of the second phase of the opening of Varosha. He encouraged Greek Cypriots to apply to the IPC to claim their properties back if they have any such rights.

Bilal Aga Mosque, which was constructed in 1821 and taken out of service in 1974, was reopened on 23 July 2021.

In response to a decision by the government of Northern Cyprus, the presidential statement of the United Nations Security Council dated on 23 July said that settling any part of the abandoned Cypriot suburb of Varosha, "by people other than its inhabitants, is 'inadmissible'." The same day, Turkey rejected the presidential statement of the Security Council on Maras (Varosha) and said that these statements were based on Greek-Greek Cypriot propaganda, groundless and unfounded claims and inconsistent with the realities on the island. On 24 July 2021, the presidency of Northern Cyprus condemned the presidential statement of the Securiity Council dated on 23 July and stated, "We see and condemn it as an attempt to create an obstacle for the property-rights-holders in Varosha to achieve their rights".

By 1 January 2022, nearly 400,000 people had visited Varosha since its opening to civilians on 6 October 2020.

On 19 May 2022, Northern Cyprus opened a 600 m by 400 m wide stretch of beach on the Golden Sands beach (from the King George Hotel to the Oceania Building) in Varosha for commercial use. Sun beds and umbrellas were installed.

The United Nations Peacekeeping Force in Cyprus said it would raise the decision taken by the Turkish Cypriot authorities to open that stretch of beach in Varosha with the Security Council, as the spokesperson Aleem Siddique said on Friday. The UN announced its "position on Varosha is unchanged and we are monitoring the situation closely".

In October 2022, the Turkish Cypriot announced that public institutions would be opened in the city.

In April 2023, the Cleo Hotel, the seven-floor Golden Seaside Hotel, and the three-star Aegean Hotel were purchased by a Turkish Cypriot businessman from their Greek Cypriot owners, who would operate them by 2025.

On 10 August 2023, the Government of Northern Cyprus decided to construct a marina and tourist facility in Varosha.

On 7 October 2024, Tatar stated, "Our aim is to demolish some buildings and restore others, bringing them into the national economy". He outlined the significant political and economic benefits Varosha had brought to Northern Cyprus (2.2 million people have visited Varosha since its opening, with 90% of tourists making it a priority to visit Varosha) and that the reopening of Varosha was also significant for the Blue Homeland. He added, "(Northern Cyprus) As an independent Turkish state in the Mediterranean and the southernmost representative of the Turkish world, the opening of Varosha under our sovereignty has served as a major contribution to the Turkish world".

On 18 August 2025, it was stated that two more hotels would be opened by Turkish Cypriots before the 2025 Presidential elections.

Being a new tourist hotspot in Northern Cyprus, Varosha was visited by nearly 5 million people by the end of 2025.

== Cultural references ==
In April 1970, the four future members of the Swedish pop group ABBA—Björn Ulvaeus, Benny Andersson, Agnetha Fältskog and Anni-Frid Lyngstad—visited Varosha (Famagusta) on a promotional holiday and performed an informal show for Swedish UN peacekeepers stationed on Cyprus. The event is widely described as the first occasion on which all four performed together, before they later formed ABBA as a group.

Varosha was analyzed by Alan Weisman in his book The World Without Us as an example of the unstoppable power of nature.

The Greek Cypriot filmmaker Michael Cacoyannis described the city and interviewed its exiled citizens in the film Attilas '74, produced in 1975.

In 2021, the Belarusian group Main-De-Gloire dedicated a song to the city.

== Gallery ==
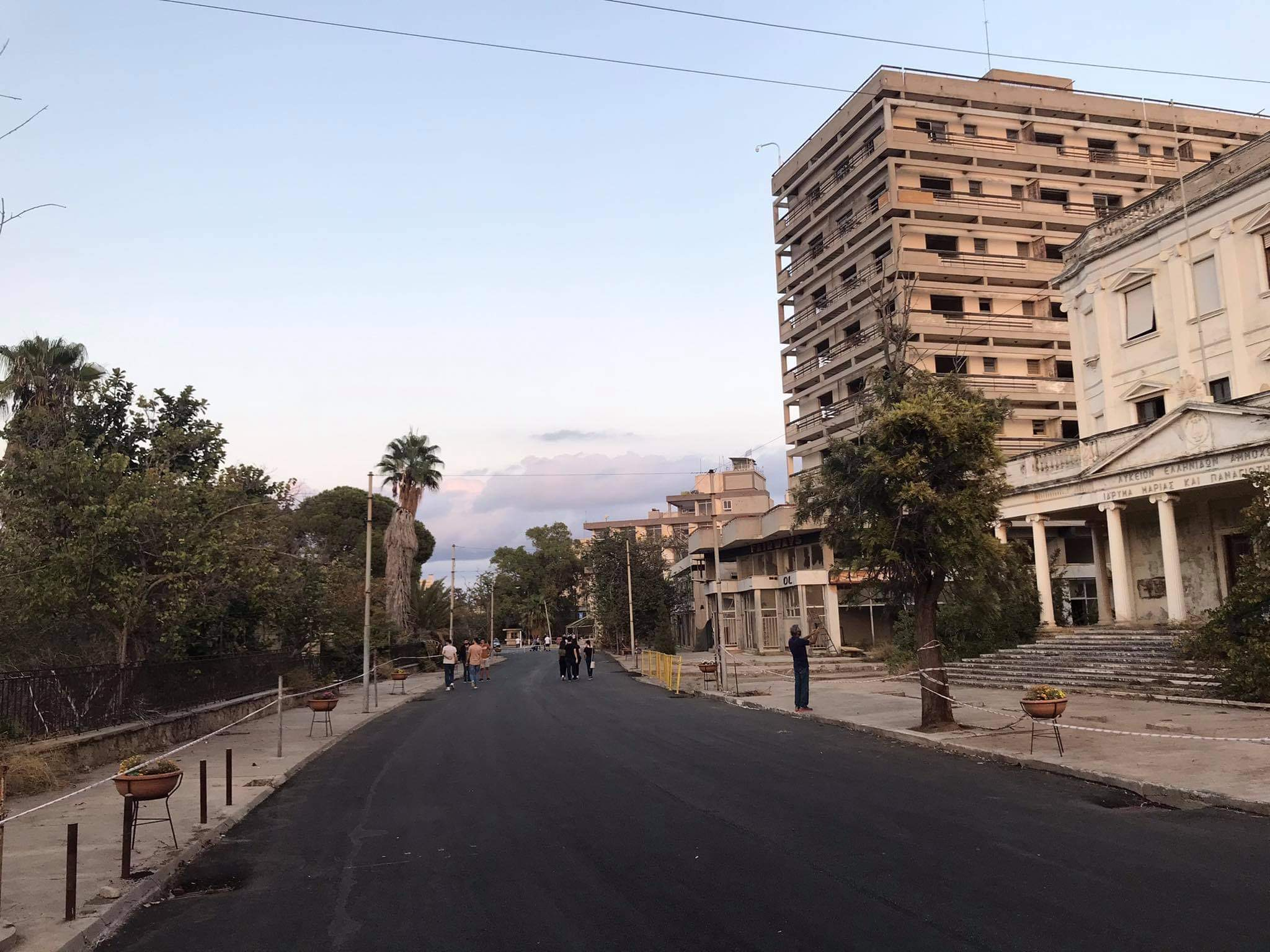
A newly paved road, Democracy Street, and abandoned buildings after reopening in 2020 (the white building to the right is the old school of art)

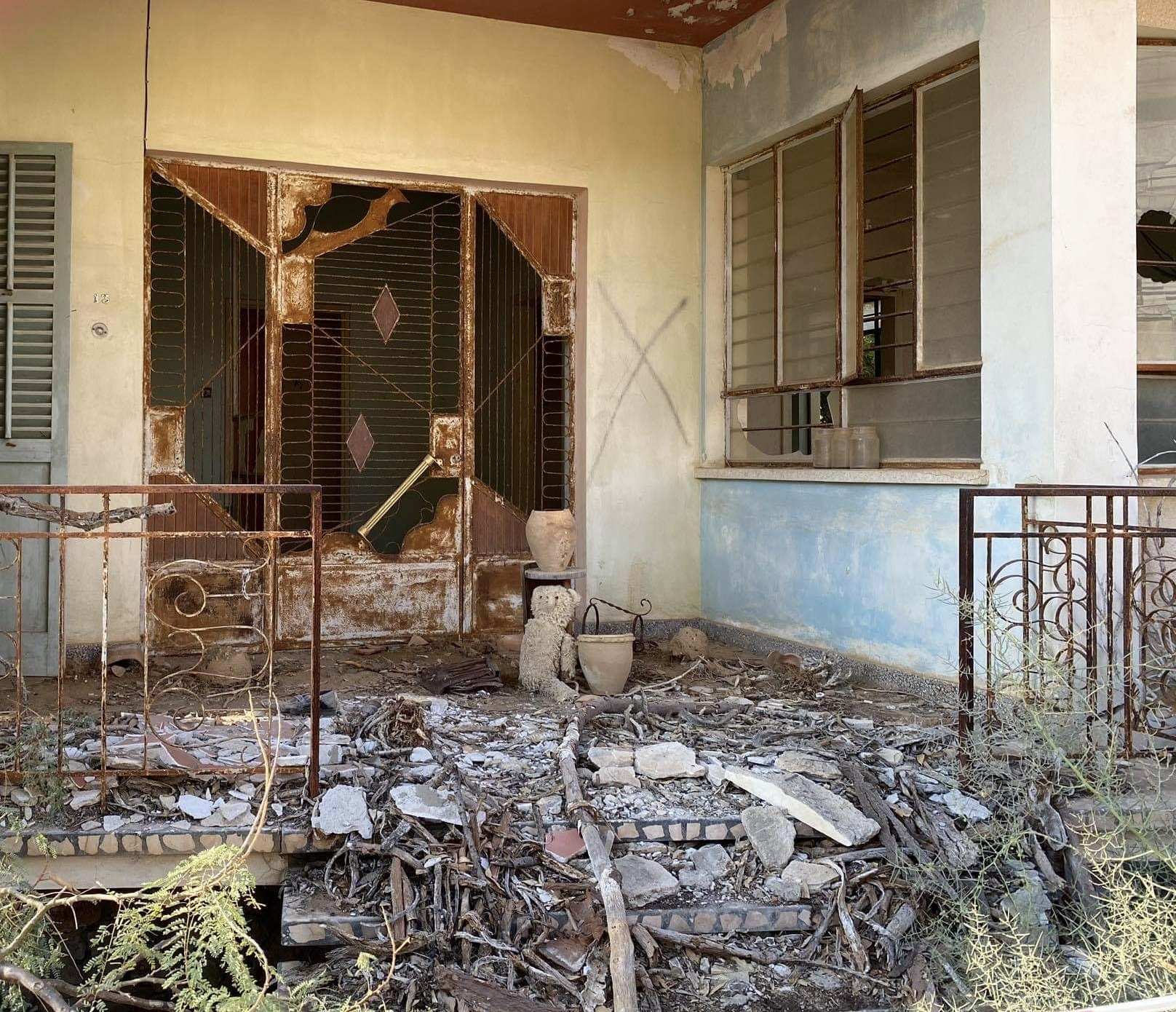
An abandoned house in Varosha; in front of the home is a frayed teddy bear.

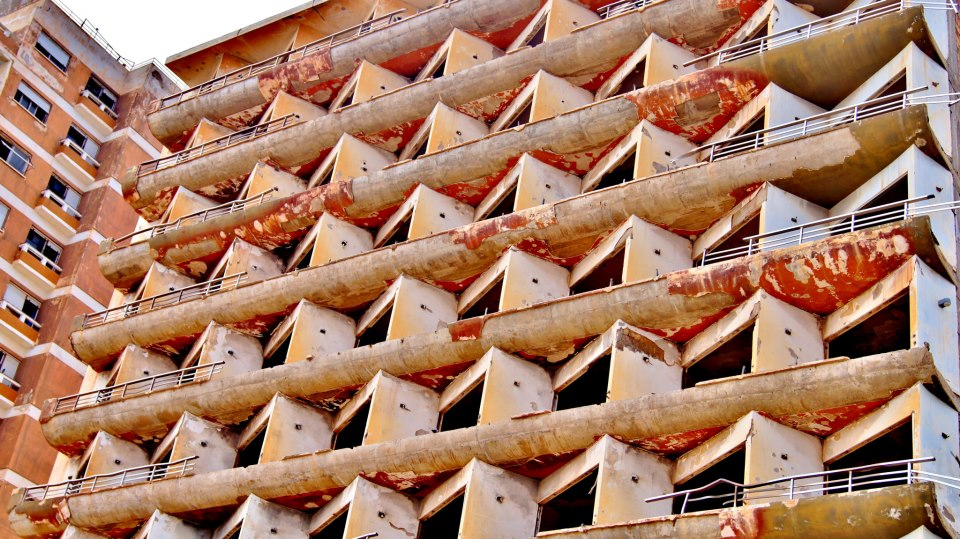
One of the many dilapidated hotels that were abandoned in 1974.

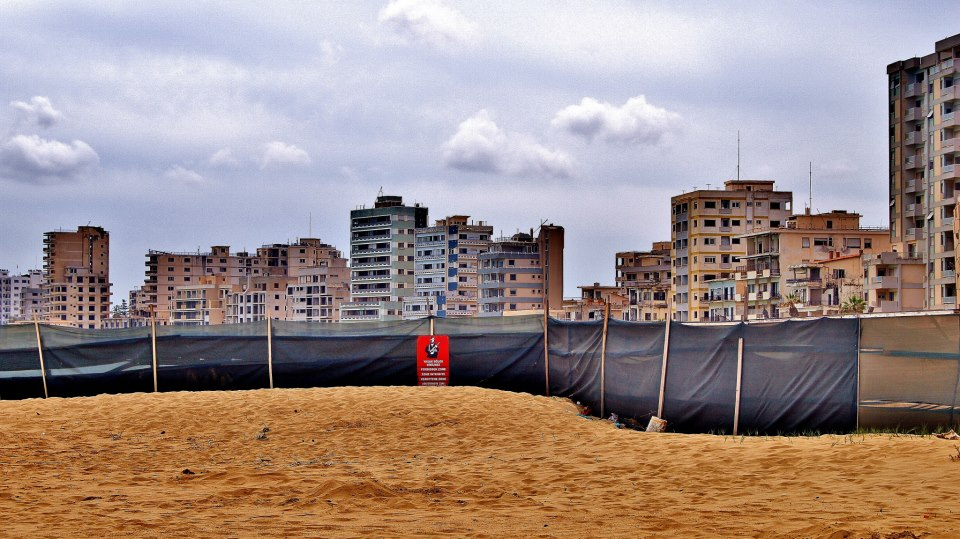
In the foreground, the fence that separates Varosha from the accessible area of Famagusta Bay.

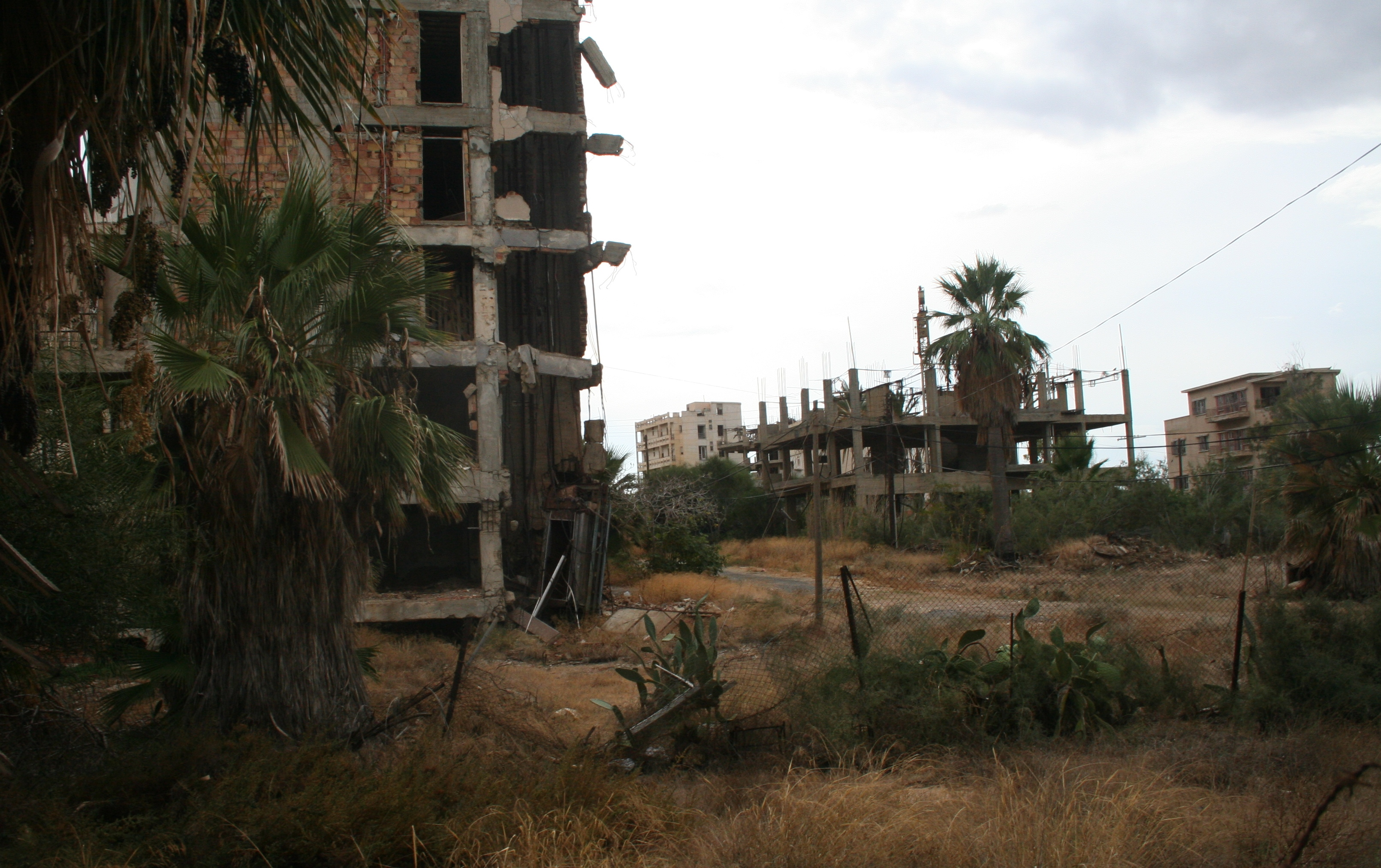
Varosha in 2009

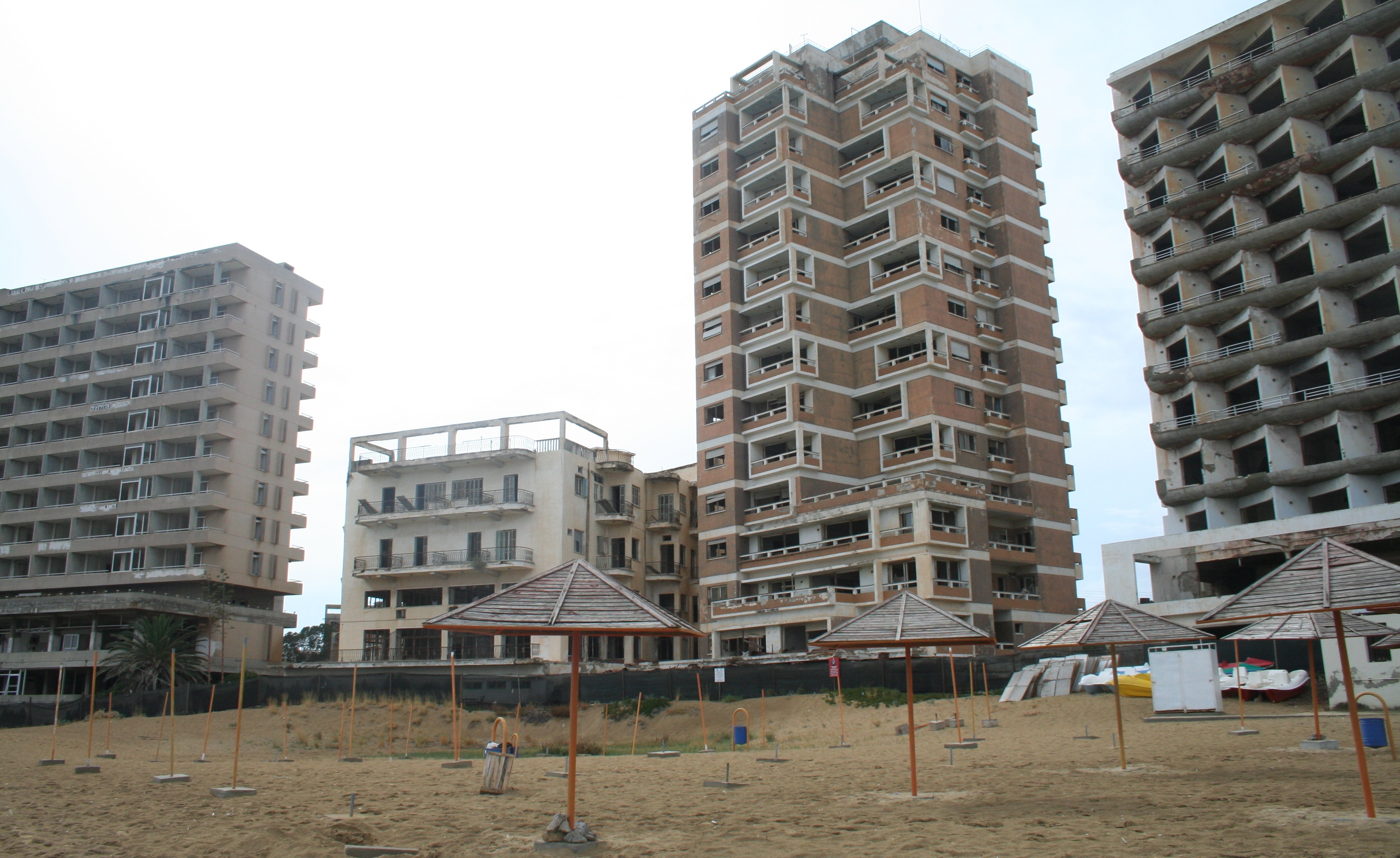
Abandoned hotels in Varosha

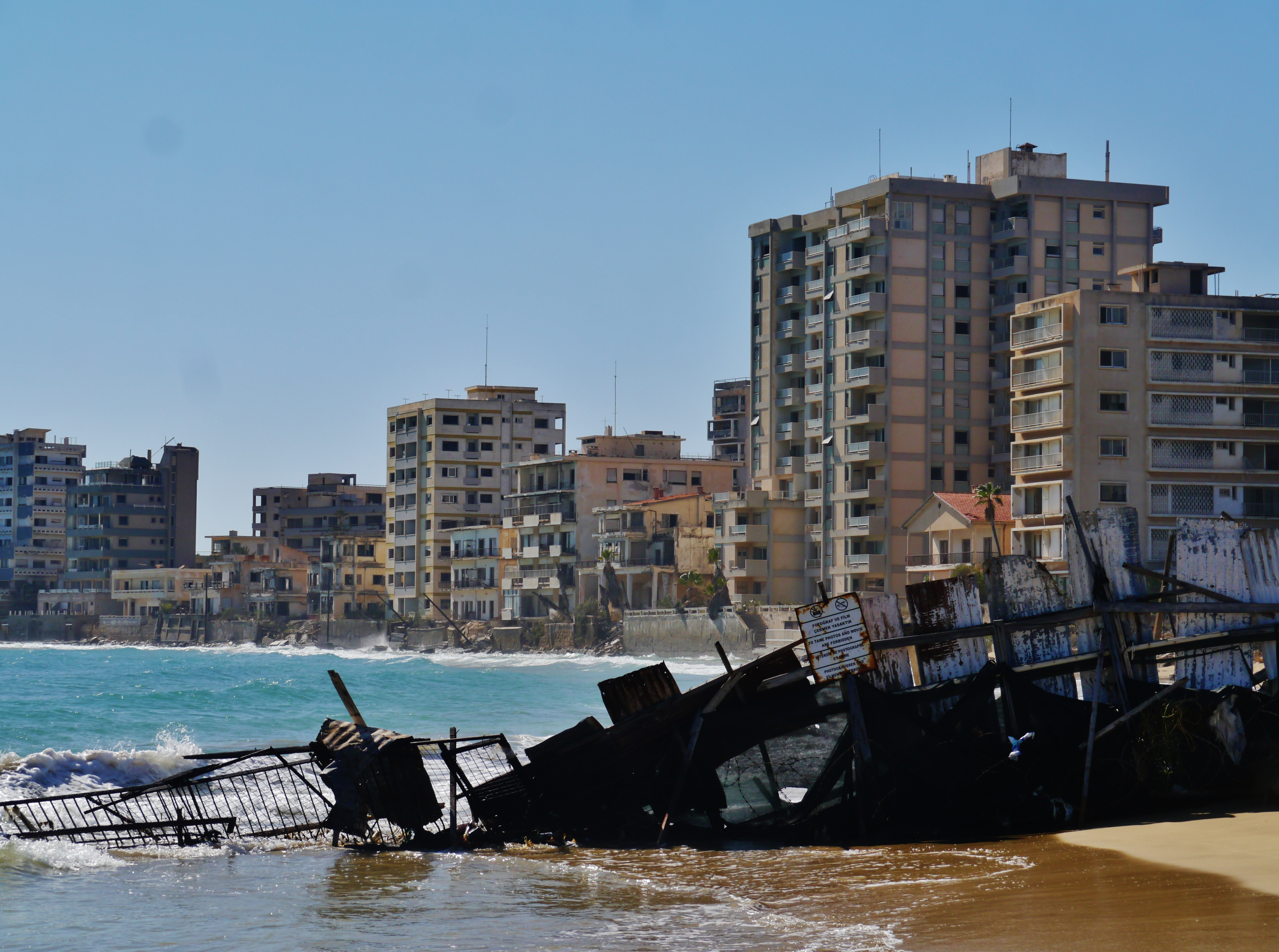
Varosha

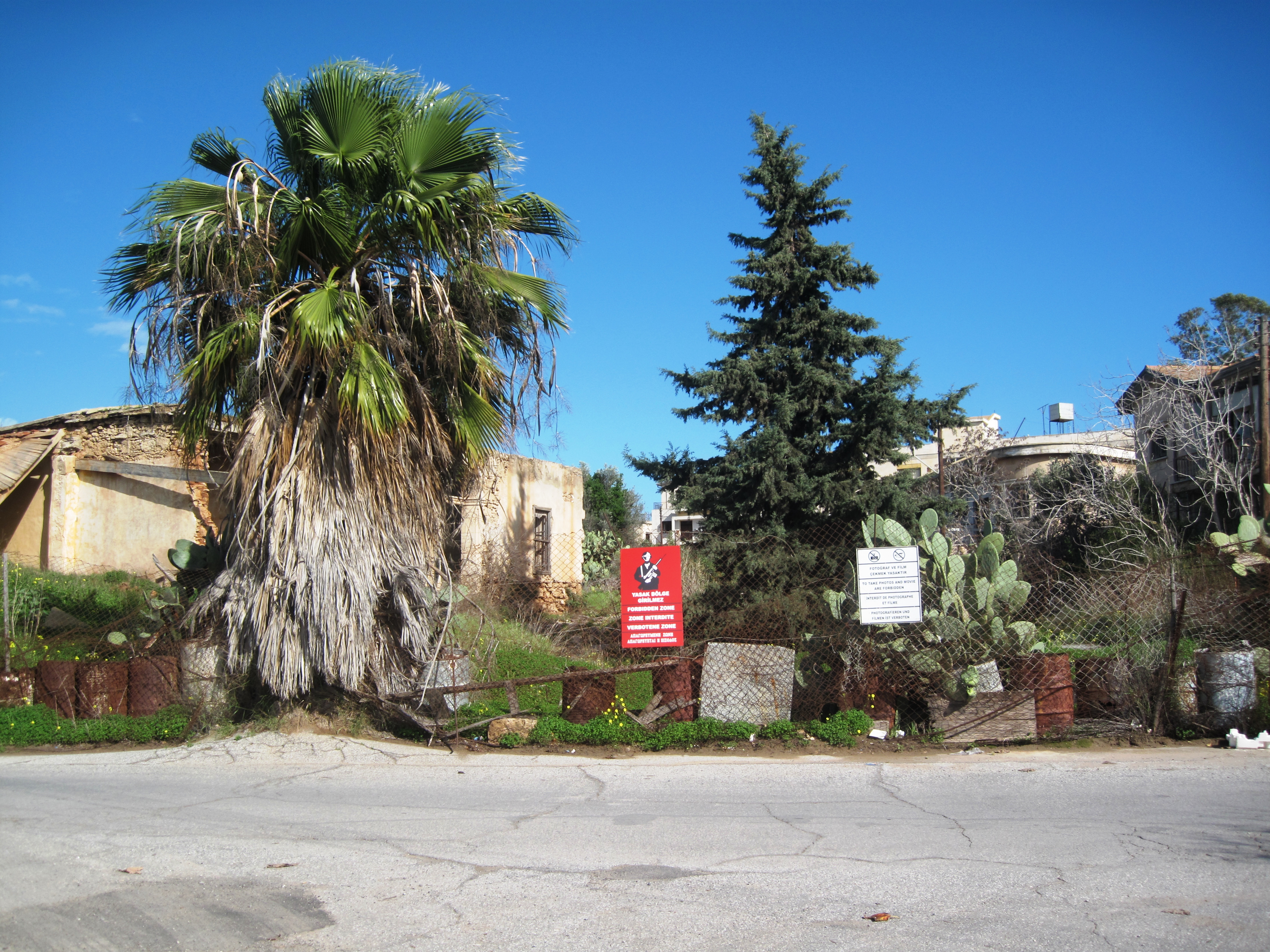
Varosha forbidden military area

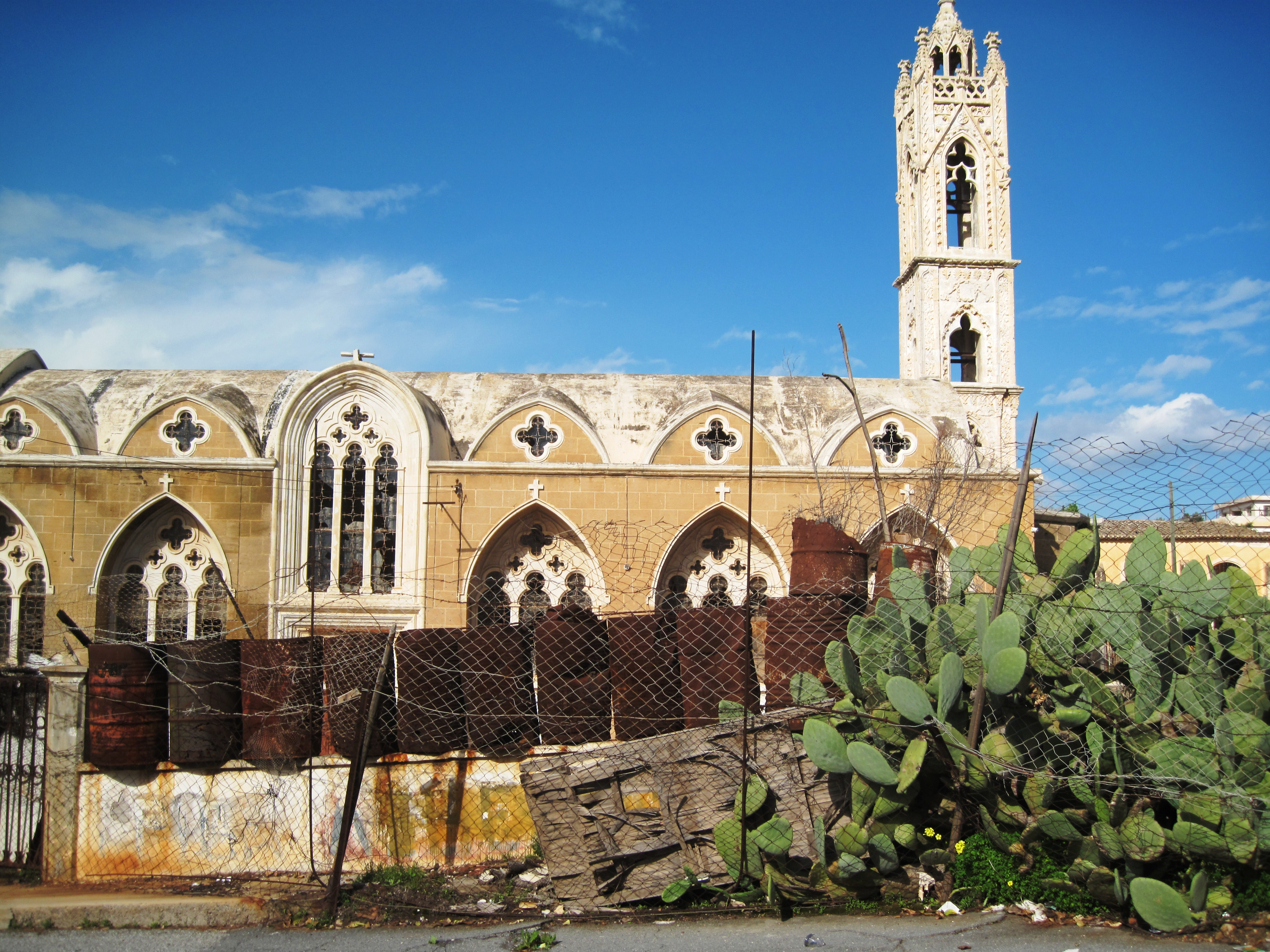
Old church in Varosha

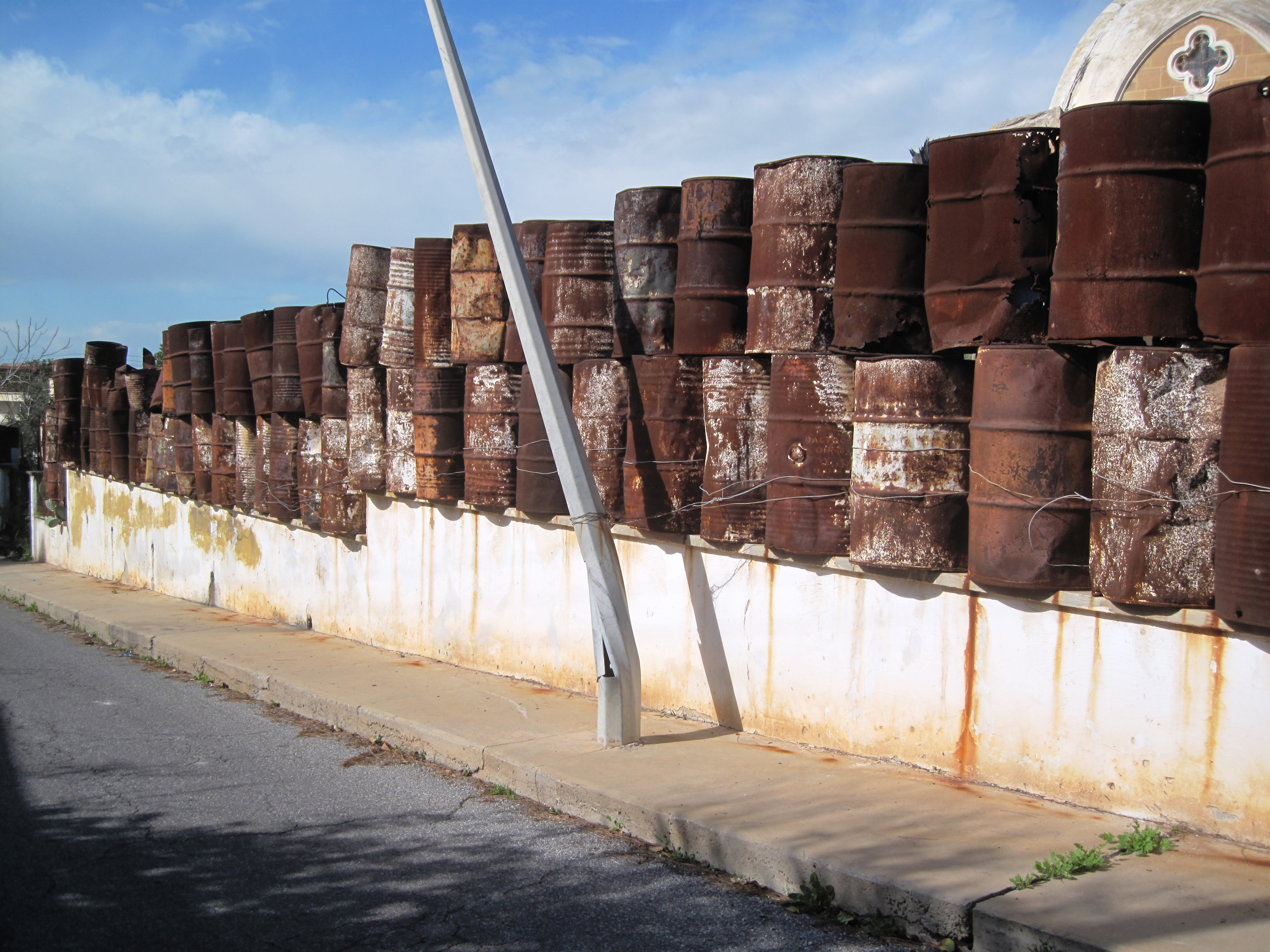
Separation of the district

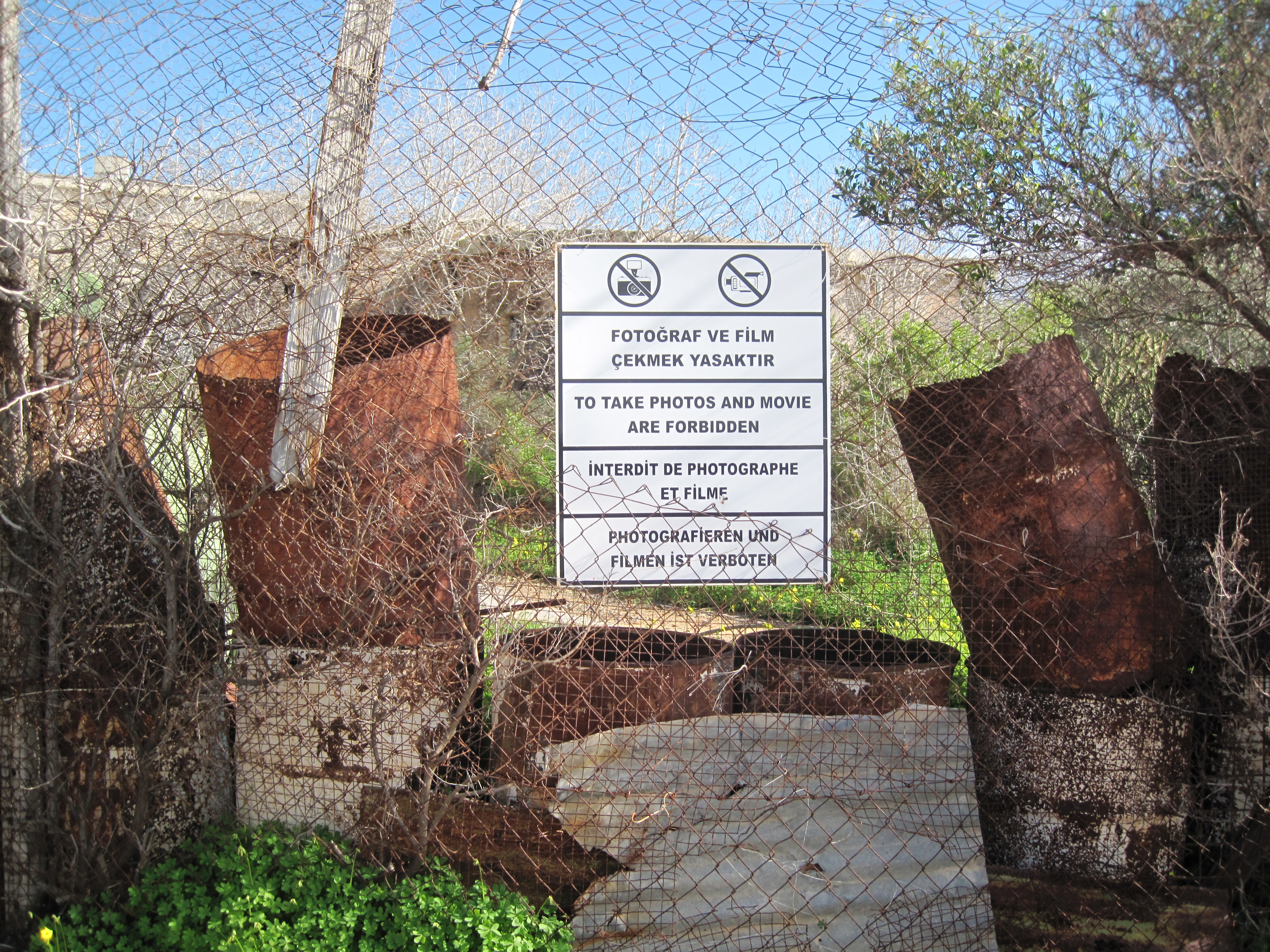
Photography prohibited

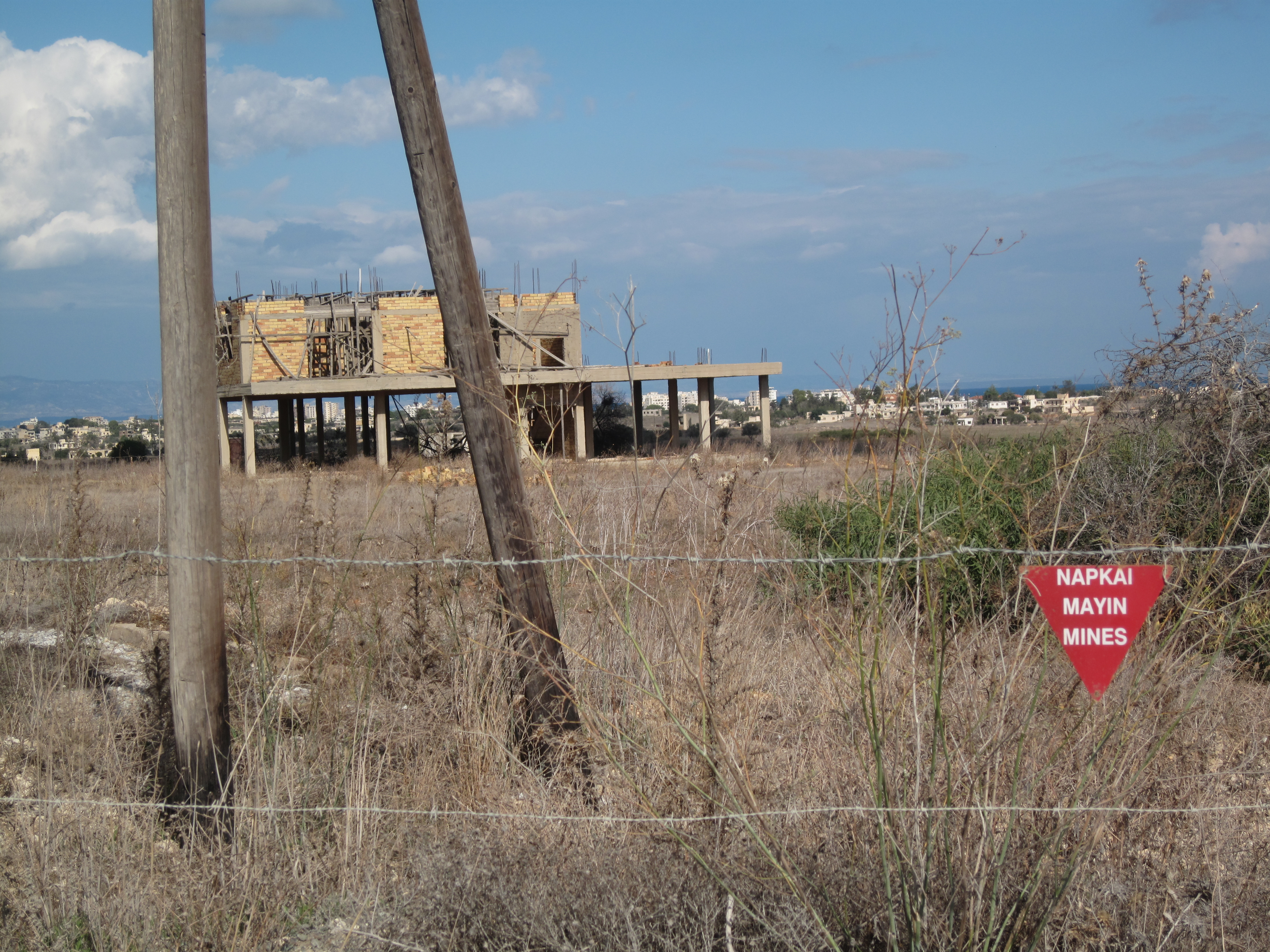
Cannot enter Varosha because of land mines

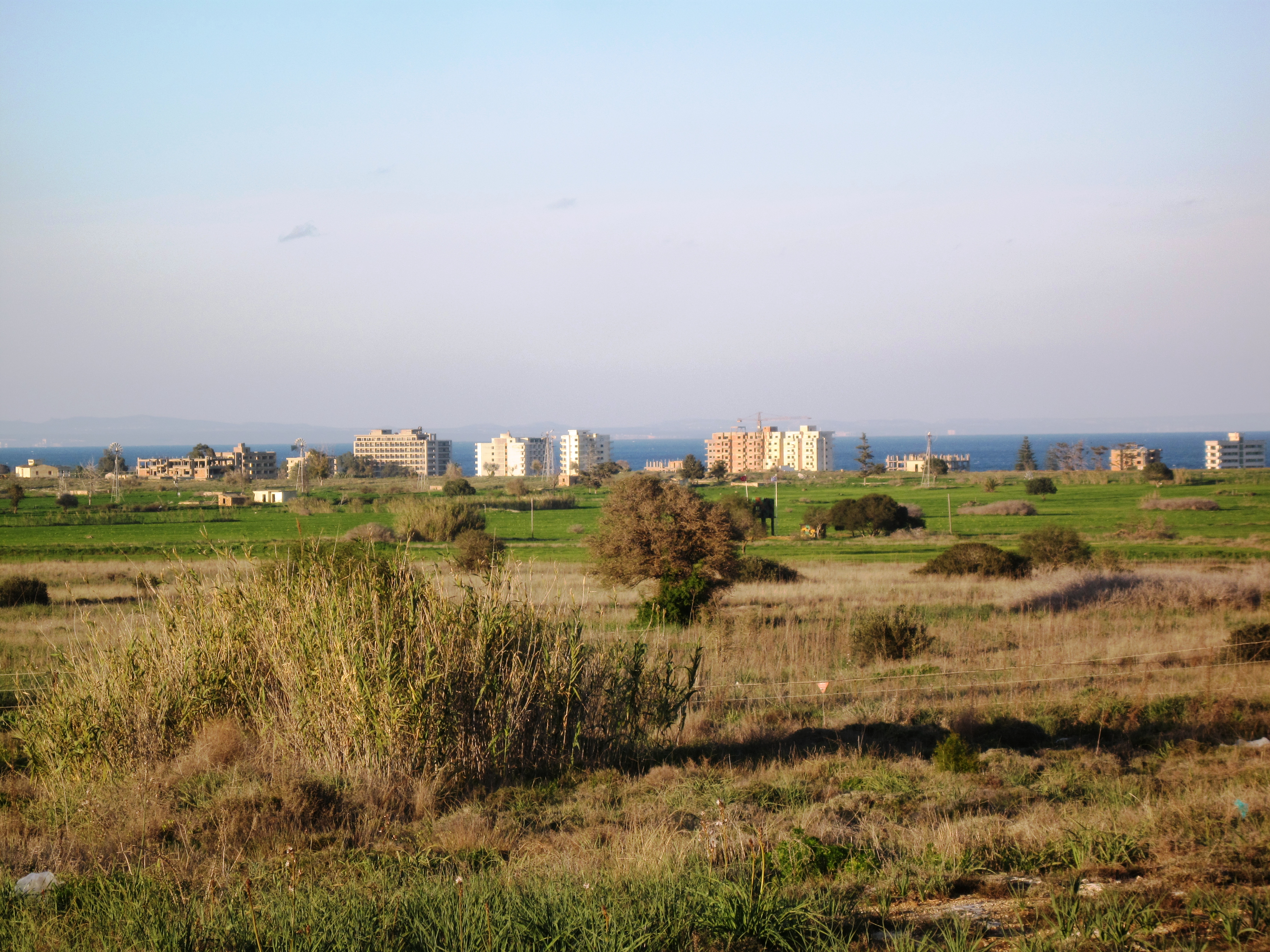
The empty hotels of Varosha

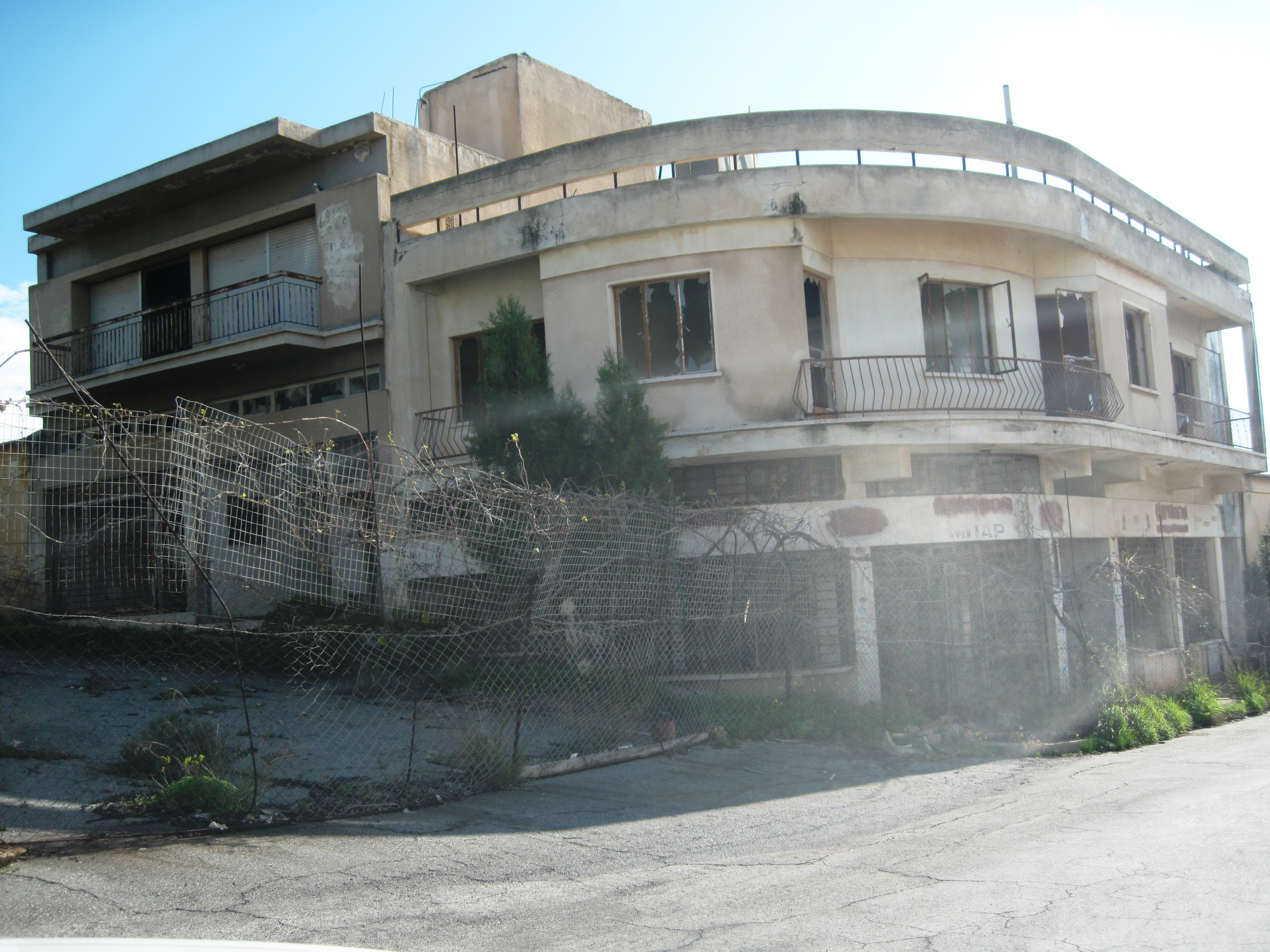
Empty shops in Varosha

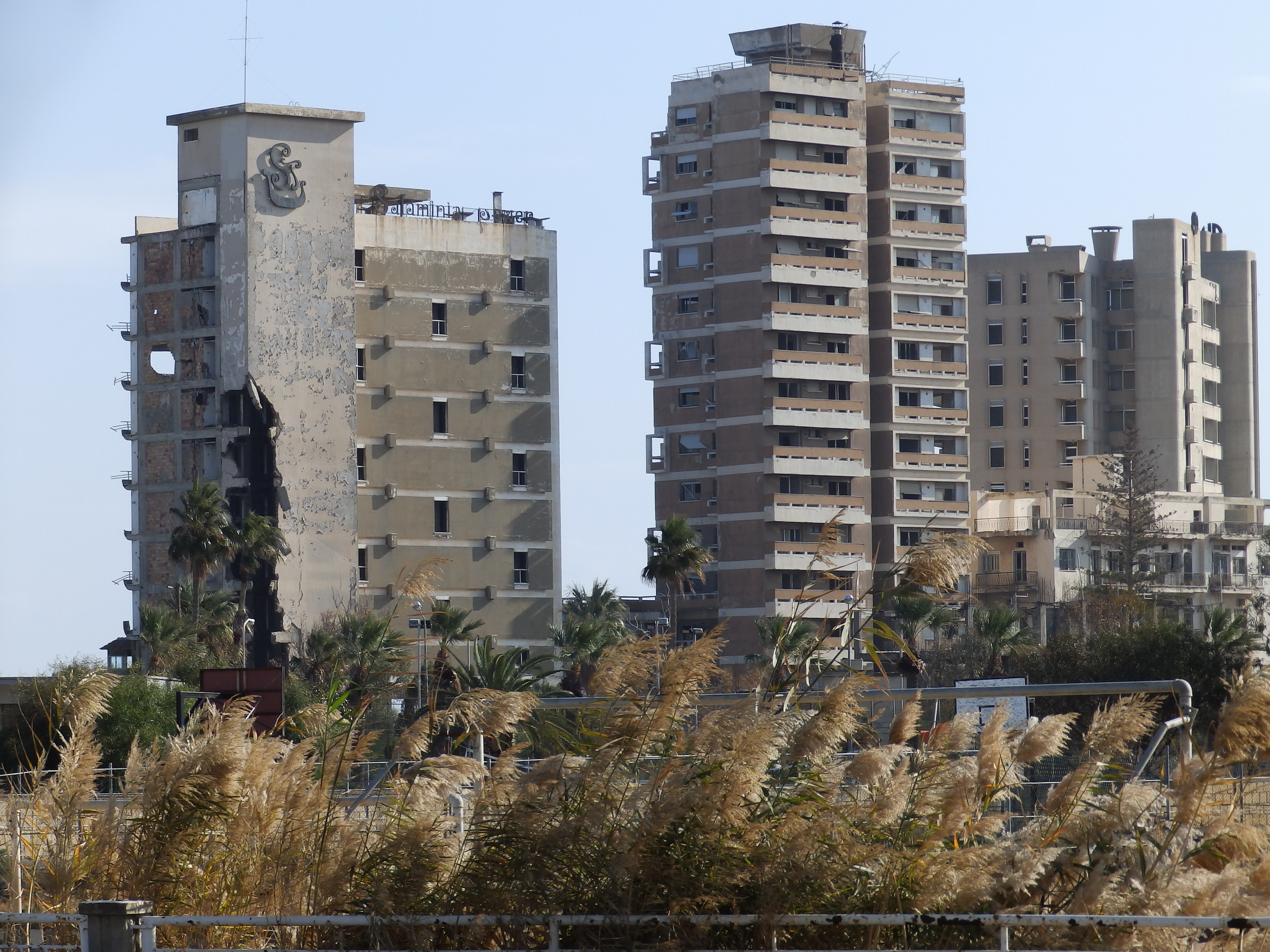
Abandoned hotels (2013)

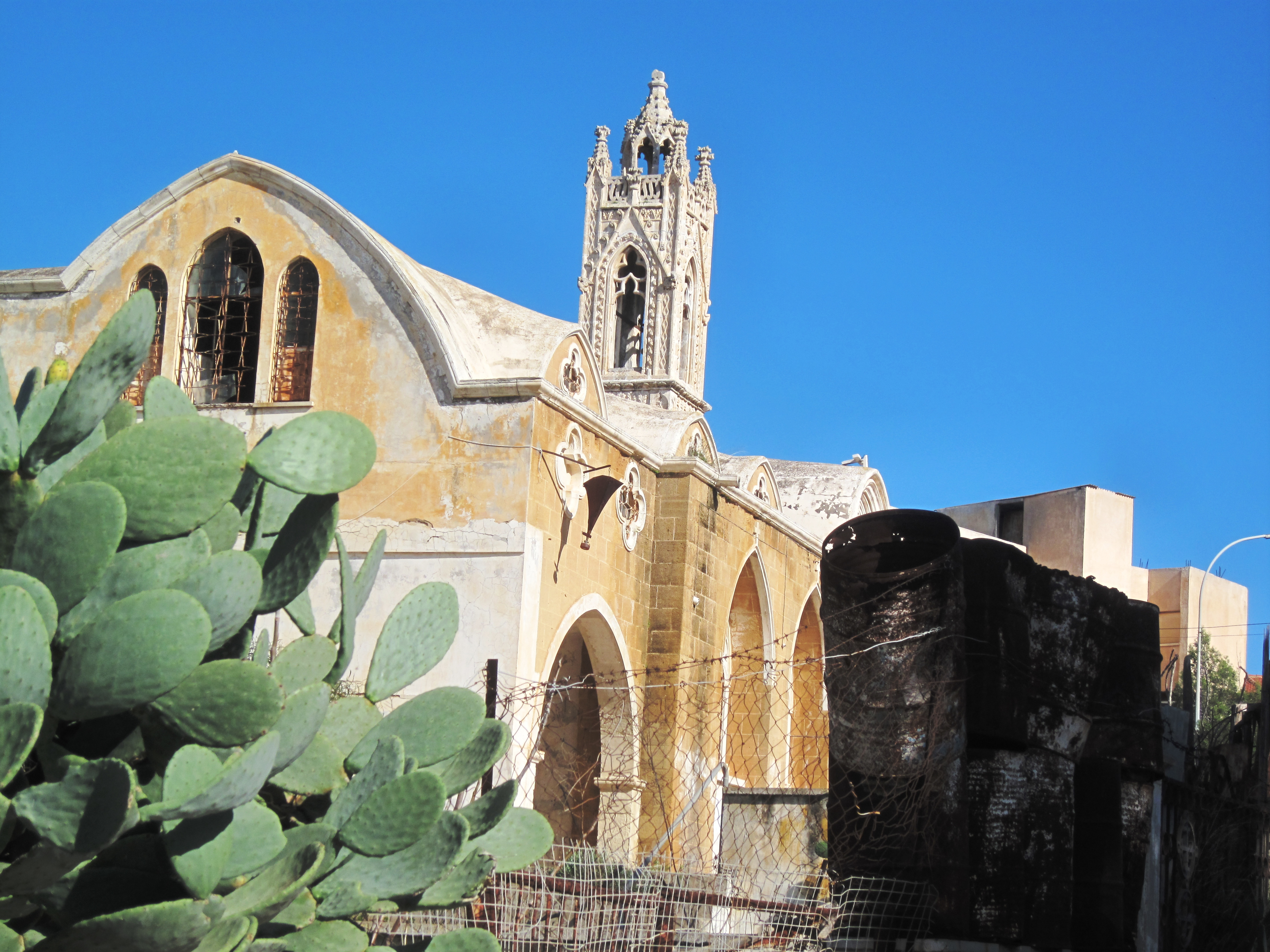
Varosha abandoned
