= Figgs =

Figgs may refer to:

- Figgs, Kentucky, unincorporated community within Shelby County
- The Figgs, American rock band

== People with the name Figgs ==
- George Figgs (born 1947), American actor and projectionist
- Ukari Figgs (born 1977), American basketball player

== See also ==
- Figg, surname
- Fig (disambiguation)
