= Fig Tree =

A fig tree is any of about 850 species of woody trees in the genus Ficus.

Fig Tree or Figtree may also refer to:

== Tree species ==
- Common fig (Ficus carica), a tree cultivated for its edible fruit
- Curtain fig (Ficus microcarpa), also known as Chinese Banyan, Malayan Banyan, Taiwan Banyan, Indian Laurel
- Moreton Bay fig (Ficus macrophylla), a tree with buttress roots that can reach 60 meters (200 ft) in height
- Rusty fig (Ficus rubiginosa), also known as Port Jackson fig or little-leaf fig
- Weeping fig (Ficus benjamina), also known as Benjamin's fig, and often sold in stores as just ficus

== Places ==
- Figtree, New South Wales, Australian; an inner western suburb of Wollongong
  - Figtree High School
- Fig Tree Point, Northbridge, New South Wales, Australia
- Figtree House, Northbridge, New South Wales, Australia
- Fig Tree Bridge, a girder bridge that spans the Lane Cove River in Sydney, New South Wales, Australia
- Fig Tree Hall, University of New South Wales, Sydney, New South Wales, Australia
- Fig Tree Hill, Mount Alma, Queensland, Australia; a hill in the Gladstone Region
- Fig Tree Pocket, Queensland, Australia; a suburb of Brisbane
- Fig Tree Point, Lota, Queensland, Australia; a headland
- La Higuera (Spanish: The Figtree), Vallegrande, Santa Cruz, Bolivia
- Fig Tree Bay, Protaras, Cyprus; a bay and beach
- Figtree, Saint Kitts and Nevis; a town on the island of Nevis
- Fig Tree Formation, South Africa; a geologic formation
- Fig Tree Primary School, Nottingham, Nottinghamshire, England, UK; a school in Nottingham
- Fig Tree Cave, Gibraltar, UK; a cave
- Fig Tree Island, Mobile County, Alabama, USA; an island
- Fig Tree Island, Alabama, USA; a city in Mobile County, former name of Satsuma
- Fig Tree Restaurant (San Antonio), Texas, USA
- Figtree, Zimbabwe; a village in the province of Matabeleland South

== As surname ==
- Gemma Figtree, Australian interventional cardiologist

== Film ==
- Fig Tree (film), a 2018 Israeli film
- Fig Trees, a 2009 Canadian documentary film
- Muhwagwa (Korean: 무화과, lit. 'Fig Tree'), a 1935 Korean film

== Literature ==
- "The Fig Tree", a 1960 short story by Katherine Anne Porter originally published in Harper's and later collected in the 1965 anthology The Collected Stories of Katherine Anne Porter
- The Figtree (Arabic: التين, romanized: Al-Tin, lit. 'The Fig'), the ninety-fifth surah of the Qur'an
- Fig Tree, an imprint of Penguin Books
- 'The Fig Tree’ is a prose poem in Sylvia Plath's novel The Bell Jar

== See also ==
- Figuier (French: Figtree), a French surname
- Figs in the Bible, references to figs and fig trees in the Tanakh and the New Testament
- Curtain Fig Tree, a heritage-listed tree in Queensland, Australia
- Moreton Bay Fig Tree (Santa Barbara, California), the largest Ficus macrophylla in the United States
- Tree (disambiguation)
- Fig (disambiguation)
