= Thoko Remigia Makhanya =

South African activist and poet

- Occupations: anti-apartheid activist, environmental activist, women's health specialist, poet and translator
- Organization(s): United Democratic Front, Biowatch South Africa
- Children: Mondli Makhanya

Thoko Remigia Makhanya is a South African anti-apartheid activist, environmental activist, women's health specialist, poet and translator.

== Biography ==
Makhanya was an activist for the anti-apartheid organisation United Democratic Front (UDF).

In 1993, Makhanya composed the praise poem "A Noble Woman of Africa" in Zulu to honour Nokukhanya Bhengu, the anti-apartheid activist and widow of Albert Luthuli. Makhanya had met Bhengu when she had been celebrating her eightieth birthday. Makhanya has also translated Elizabeth Ncube's praise poem to Mbuya Nehanda from French into English.

Makhanya later became a health specialist and development practitioner with a focus on women’s development and health. She volunteered for the PPHC HIV/AIDs group in Durban during the 1990s.

In 2010, Makhanya joined the board of trustees of the environmental justice NGO Biowatch South Africa, campaigning against genetically modified organisms (GMOs) and the industrialised food system. She was a leader of the GM-Free KwaZulu-Natal campaign, raised awareness about how the American agribusiness corporation Monsanto, in partnership with the South African Government, were handing out free GM seeds to farmers, and has advocated for food sovereignty. She retired from the board of trustees in 2019.

Makhanya's son is journalist Mondli Makhanya.
