= Fig (disambiguation) =

Fig is the sweet edible flower of Ficus carica, small tree cultivated in temperate areas

Fig, figs, or variants, may also refer to:

- Ficus, a genus of about 850 species of tropical shrubs and trees

== Arts and entertainment ==
- Feminist Improvising Group, an English jazz and experimental music ensemble
- Fievel Is Glauque, a Belgian-American jazz-pop duo
- F.I.G, a 2026 album by Naomi Scott

== Businesses and organisations ==
- Fig (company), a crowdfunding platform
- Fig (restaurant), a restaurant in Charleston, South Carolina
- Figs (company), an American clothing company
- Fortress Investment Group, an American investment management firm
- International Federation of Surveyors (Fédération Internationale des Géomètres, FIG)
- International Gymnastics Federation (Fédération Internationale de Gymnastique, FIG)

== People ==
- Anton Fig (born 1952), South African drummer
- David Fig, South African environmental sociologist, political economist, and activist
- Henrik Fig (born 1972), Danish footballer

== Places ==
- Fig, North Carolina, U.S.
- Fria Airport (IATA airport code FIG), Guinea

== Other uses ==
- Fig., the standard botanical author abbreviation for Antonio Bey Figari (1804–1870)
- The Fig (Arabic: التين, romanized: Al-Tin, lit. 'The Figtree'), the ninety-fifth surah of the Qur'an

== See also ==
- Fig Tree (disambiguation)
- Figure (disambiguation)
- Indian Fig (disambiguation)
- Fig leaf, a metaphorical term
- Fig Rig, a camera stabilization device for smaller cameras
- Fig sign, a hand gesture
- Figging, a sexual practice of inserting a piece of ginger root into the anus or vagina
- FIGS
- Xfig, a free and open-source vector graphics editor
