= Kapparis =

Village in Cyprus

Kapparis Κάπαρης (Greek)
- Village
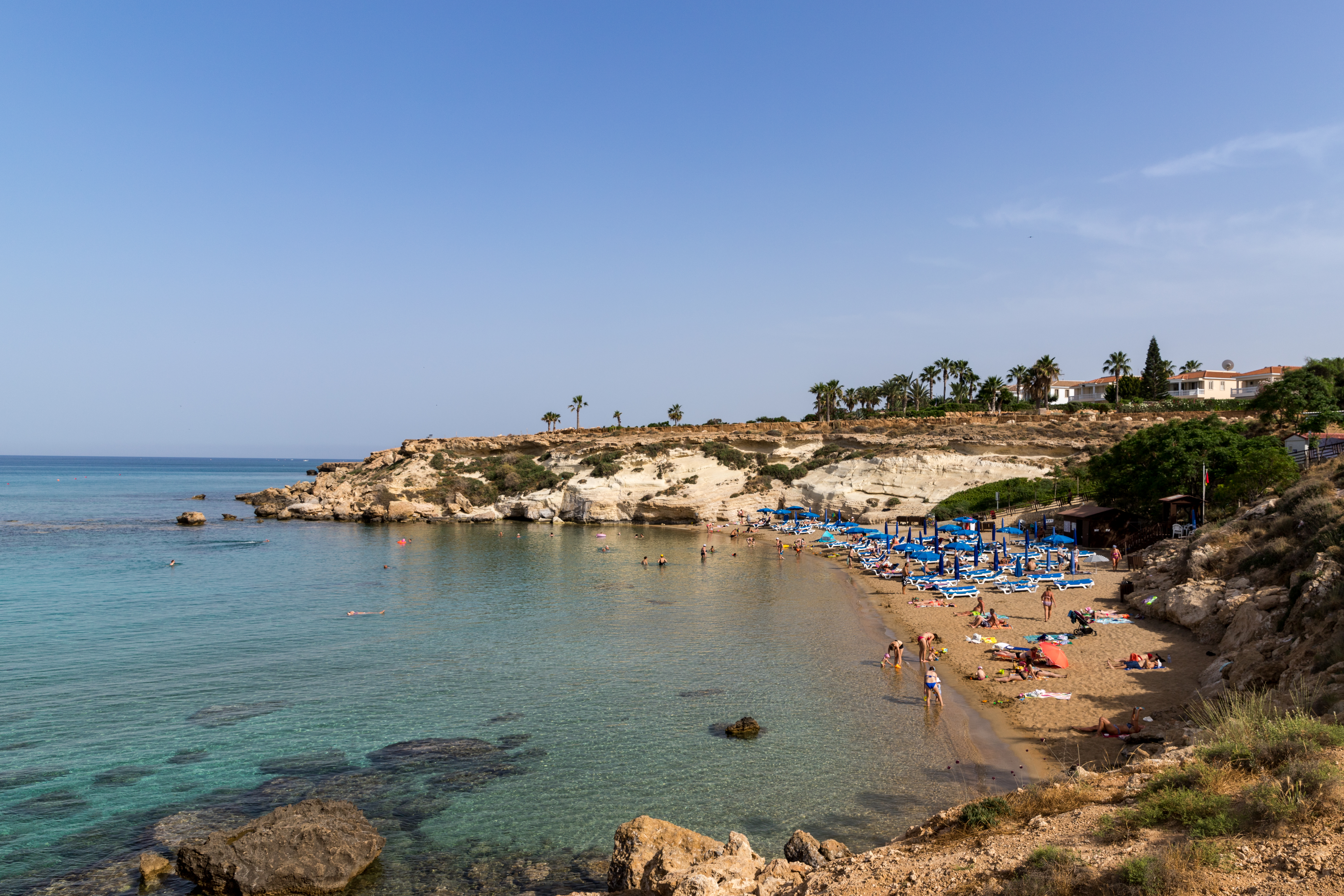
- Kapparis Beach

- Location in Cyprus
- Coordinates: 35°03′10″N 34°00′25″E
- Country: Cyprus
- District: Famagusta District

Government
  - Mayor: Theodoros Pyrillis
- Time zone: UTC+2 (EET)
  - Summer (DST): UTC+3 (EEST)
- Postal code: 5290

Kapparis (Greek: Κάπαρης) is a village located between Paralimni and Protaras in the Famagusta District of Cyprus. It is a relatively new tourist location, offering a quieter alternative to nearby Ayia Napa and Protaras. It has three beaches and numerous shops, bars, and restaurants; some of these establishments are British-owned and cater to the sizable number of British immigrants in the village, as well as attracting British tourists staying in Ayia Napa and Protaras. There are some air raid shelters in the area that were built during the 1974 Turkish invasion of Cyprus.
