= Mondli Makhanya =

South African journalist

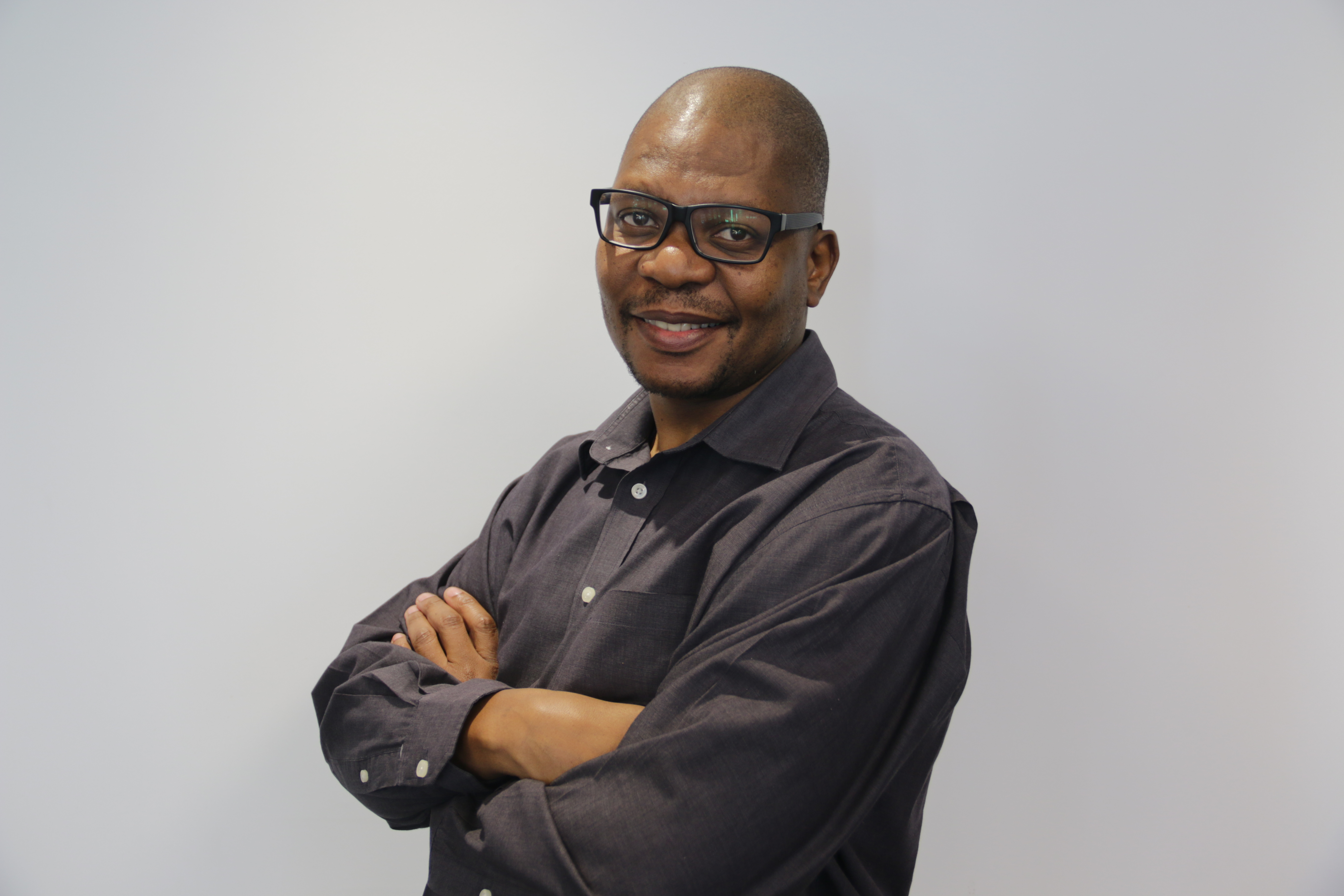
- Makhanya in 2017
- Citizenship: South Africa
- Occupation: Journalist
- Years active: 1990–present
- Employer: City Press
- Mother: Thoko Remigia Makhanya

Mondli Makhanya is a South African journalist who has been editor-in-chief of City Press since 2016. He was formerly the editor of the Mail & Guardian from 2002 to 2003, the editor of the Sunday Times from 2004 to 2010, and the editor-in-chief at the Times Media Group from 2010 to 2013. He is also a former chairperson of the South African National Editors' Forum. He is well known for his political commentary, currently published in City Press columns.

== Family ==
Makhanya is the son of South African activist and poet Thoko Remigia Makhanya.

== Career ==
Makhanya began his career as a journalist at the Weekly Mail in 1990. He interned at Newsweek in New York and then returned to the Weekly Mail, where he was head of the Cape Town bureau from 1994. In 1995, he moved to the Star, where he spent four years as a political reporter and deputy news editor before he was appointed associate editor of the Sunday World, a newly launched publication under Fred Khumalo's editorship, in 1999. As the Sunday World quickly became a tabloid, Makhanya left in 2000 to join the Sunday Times as a political editor; he later became the paper's deputy managing editor for politics and policy.

=== Mail & Guardian: 2002–2003 ===
On 1 October 2002, Makhanya began a new position as editor of the Mail & Guardian, succeeding Howard Barrell. However, a little over a year into his tenure, the newspaper announced that he had resigned in order to return to the Sunday Times as editor, a position from which Mathatha Tsedu had recently been fired. After he had resigned from the paper, the Mail & Guardian named him as one of three journalists who were expected to "emerge as key figures in our public life over the next decade", saying, "Few South African editors enjoy as much respect from their peers and political movers and shakers". He was succeeded at the Mail & Guardian by Ferial Haffajee.

=== Times Media: 2004–2013 ===
Makhanya's appointment at the Sunday Times was effective from 1 February 2004. He remained in the position for six years, during which time the paper's readership grew from 3.2 million to almost four million. During this period, in 2006, he was named as one of the World Economic Forum's Young Global Leaders. As editor, he printed a notorious satirical cartoon by Zapiro, the Rape of Lady Justice, in 2008; he and Zapiro were both named in the resulting defamation lawsuit lodged by former Deputy President Jacob Zuma, the subject of cartoon. He also printed a highly controversial column by David Bullard and then invited further controversy by firing Bullard.

In March 2010, it was announced that Ray Hartley would replace Makhanya as Sunday Times editor and that he in turn would become editor-in-chief of all Avusa Media newspapers. Although this was presented as a promotion, Tawana Kupe observed that Makhanya's new role appeared relatively narrow and speculated that Makhanya, "at a young age and in his prime as an editor, has been retired by being kicked upstairs". Makhanya remained in the position after Avusa changed ownership and became the Times Media Group, but he resigned in early 2013 to write a book about South African politics. During his time at Avusa, he also served a term as chairperson of the South African National Editors' Forum.

=== City Press: 2016–present ===
Makhanya became editor-in-chief of City Press with effect from 1 August 2016.

== Views and controversies ==
=== Mbeki and the Arms Deal ===
As a columnist, Makhanya was an outspoken critic of the 1999 Arms Deal and frequently clashed with the government and supporters of former President Thabo Mbeki.

=== Buthelezi and the IFP ===
Makhanya has also been openly critical of Mangosuthu Buthelezi since the early 1990s, during South Africa's democratic transition; at that time, supporters of Buthelezi's Inkatha Freedom Party (IFP) were engaged in a low-intensity civil conflict with supporters of the rival African National Congress in the PWV and KwaZulu-Natal regions. In 2010, IFP politician Mario Ambrosini, wrote to the Sunday Times in 2010 to demand that the paper should, for the sake of its credibility, "bar [Makhanya] from writing about Buthelezi", given the volume of Makhanya's "preposterous attacks". In August 2022, City Press published a particularly energetic column, entitled "Hail the mass murderer", in which Makhanya wrote of Buthelezi:

It boggles the mind how a nation that claims to be appalled at South Africa’s high levels of violent crime can celebrate a mass murderer who contributed so much to the culture of violence that prevails today; how a people that is so fixated on the sins of the past can so casually overlook the sins of a man who was responsible for so much of the killing that happened in the name of apartheid... It is hoped that the pain that still flows in many families and communities that fell victim to Buthelezi and the IFP’s many raids, assassinations and massacres will haunt those who want to sanitise history and salute the mass murderer.

In response to the column, the IFP organised a protest march on City Press's Johannesburg offices, with IFP president Velenkosini Hlabisa expressing the IFP's "de-satisfaction about the way Mr Mondli Makhanya has been behaving for many years". SANEF condemned the protest as an attempt to intimidate a journalist. In the same week, IFP spokesman and parliamentarian Mkhuleko Hlengwa told Eusebius McKaiser of the Sunday Times that Makhanya was incapable of writing "objectively" about Buthelezi because he was himself implicated in the political violence of the 1990s: pressed for details, Hlengwa said, without providing evidence, that Makhanya had been involved in killing IFP members. Makhanya said the claim was "balderdash".

A similar claim had been made in June 2022 by IFP president Hlabisa, who had said that Makhanya "has a history of hating [the] IFP" and was a "self-confessed murderer": according to Hlabisa, Makhanya had written a column in the Weekly Mail in 1990, under the pseudonym Oscar Gumede, in which he "confessed that he used to rejoice when he participated in the killing of IFP members by setting alight their houses". On that occasion, Makhanya had said that he did not dispute that he had written under a pseudonym, but said, "In that article, I wrote about the violence in KwaZulu-Natal, and what they are trying to do now is to turn things around and say that I have murdered a person. I have said nothing about me murdering anyone. I merely spoke of how the violence happened then".

Among Makhanya's criticisms of Buthelezi was that he had exploited Zulu identity for narrow political purposes. On similar grounds, he was also critical of Zulu King Goodwill Zwelithini, who he claimed had enabled the IFP's Zulu nationalism. When Zwelithini died in March 2021, Makhanya's column read:

Zwelithini should be remembered for what his most prominent role was in our history: a useful idiot in the hands of the apartheid government, whose willingness to lend his powerful position to the service of that regime cost tens of thousands of lives.
