= David Fig =

- Education: London School of Economics
- Occupation: environmental sociologist

David Fig
- Born: Jacana
- Occupations: environmental sociologist; political economist; activist

David Fig (Born in Jacana ) is a South African environmental sociologist, political economist, and activist. He holds a PhD from the London School of Economics, with his thesis titled, "The political economy of South-South relations: The case of South Africa and Latin America," and specialises in questions of energy, trade, biodiversity, and corporate responsibility. His recent books include: Staking their Claims: Corporate Social and Environmental Responsibility in South Africa (UKZN Press, 2007), and Uranium Road: Questioning South Africa's Nuclear Direction (Jacana, 2005), which was turned into a 53-minute documentary film in 2007.

Fig chairs the board of Biowatch South Africa, which is concerned with food security and sustainable agriculture, and works closely with various environmental justice non-government organizations. He has previously been executive director of the Group for Environmental Monitoring in Johannesburg, a senior lecturer in sociology at the University of the Witwatersrand, and a board member of South African National Parks.

== Career ==
He is chair of the board of Biowatch South Africa, a non-governmental organization focused on agro-ecology, food independence, and biosafety. In the past, he has held leadership roles at LEAD Southern Africa, the International Sociology Association Research Committee on Environment and Society, and the African Uranium Alliance. He has written numerous publications, including books, monographs, book chapters, and journal articles, which have been published in French, Portuguese, Spanish, and German. He has also provided instruction at UCT and Wits Universities and participated in educational initiatives throughout several countries in Southern Africa.

== See also ==
- Anti-nuclear movement
