= George Figg =

English cricketer

Personal information
- Full name: George Figg
- Born: 13 June 1824; Horsham, Sussex, England
- Died: 20 July 1888 (aged 64); Horsham, Sussex, England
- Batting: Right-handed
- Bowling: Right-arm roundarm medium

Domestic team information
- Years: Team
- 1865–1866: Sussex
- 1850: Middlesex

Career statistics
| Competition | First-class |
|---|---|
| Matches | 11 |
| Runs scored | 77 |
| Batting average | 6.41 |
| 100s/50s | –/– |
| Top score | 26* |
| Balls bowled | 2,031 |
| Wickets | 38 |
| Bowling average | 18.47 |
| 5 wickets in innings | 3 |
| 10 wickets in match | – |
| Best bowling | 6/42 |
| Catches/stumpings | 7/– |
- Source: Cricinfo, 12 July 2012

George Figg (13 June 1824 – 20 July 1888) was an English cricketer. Figg was a right-handed batsman who bowls right-arm roundarm medium. He was born at Horsham, Sussex.

Figg made a single first-class appearance for Middlesex against Surrey at Lord's in 1850. Figg failed to score any runs or take any wickets during the match. Fifteen years later, Figg made a second first-class appearance, this time for Sussex against Nottinghamshire at Trent Bridge. He made nine further first-class appearances for Sussex, the last of which came against Kent in 1866. In his ten first-class appearances for the county, he took 38 wickets at an average of 18.47, with best figures of 6/42. One of three five wicket hauls he took, his best figures came against Kent in 1865. With the bat, he scored 77 runs at a batting average of 7.00, with a high score of 26 not out.

He died at the town of his birth on 20 July 1888.
