= Fig (restaurant) =

American Restaurant

Coordinates: 32°46′57″N 79°55′54″W

Restaurant information
- Established: April 2003
- Location: 232 Meeting Street
- Website: https://eatatfig.com/

Fig, stylized as FIG, is a modern American restaurant located in Charleston, South Carolina. The name is an acronym for "Food Is Good." Established in April 2003 by Mike Lata and partner Adam Nemirow, the restaurant is situated in downtown Charleston. Fig is known for its Southern classics, featuring seasonal ingredients served in a bistro setting.

In 2018, the restaurant won the James Beard Award for Outstanding Wine and Other Beverages Program. Two of its chefs have also won James Beard Awards.

== Background ==
Lata and Nemirow signed the lease for Fig on December 31, 2002. Five months later, in April 2003, FIG opened in the single-story space at the corner of Meeting and Hasell streets.

Lata and Nemirow met while working together at Anson Restaurant and reconnected a few years later when they decided to open Fig. The goal of Fig's menu is to serve local ingredients, with French-influenced cooking, using seasonality and paying homage to European farmhouse cooking.

== Awards ==
In 2018, Fig won the James Beard Award for Outstanding Wine and Other Beverages Program.

Two of Fig's chefs have won James Beard Awards for Best Chef: Southeast, Lata in 2009 and Jason Stanhope in 2015.
