= Indian fig =

Indian fig is a common name for several plants and may refer to:

- Ficus benghalensis, a species of banyan tree also known as East Indian fig.
- Opuntia ficus-indica, a species of cactus also known as Indian fig opuntia.
- Opuntia humifusa, a species of cactus also known as eastern prickly pear.
- Ficus racemosa, is a species of plant in the family Moraceae.
