= William Douglas Figg Sr. =

American pharmacologist

William Douglas Figg is an American scientist (pharmacologist). He is a senior investigator (tenured) at the National Cancer Institute (NCI), National Institutes of Health (NIH), Bethesda, Maryland. He holds multiple titles within the NCI: Associate Director of the Center for Cancer Research, Co-Director of the Office of Translational Resources, Acting Branch Chief for the Genitourinary Malignancies Branch, Chief of the Clinical Pharmacology Program, and head of the Molecular Pharmacology Section. Figg is also the Senior Advisor for Basic Research at the Center for Prostate Disease Research within the Walter Reed National Military Medical Center – Murtha Cancer Center in Bethesda, Maryland.

Figg has more than 875 peer-reviewed articles, and his work has been mentioned over 66,200 times in the scholarly literature. He has an H-index of 136 and an i10-index of 689, both indicators of scientific influence. He has published/edited six books.

== Education ==
Figg grew up in Beaver Dam, Kentucky, and graduated from Ohio County High School, in Hartford, Kentucky (1981). He earned a BS in pharmacy from Samford University (1987), and a doctoral degree in pharmacy from Auburn University (1989). He completed an internship at the UAB Hospital (1990) and a fellowship in drug development at the UNC Eshelman School of Pharmacy (1992). He is a recipient of honorary degrees from Georgetown College and the Philadelphia College of Osteopathic Medicine.

== Research and career ==
Figg is an expert in molecular pharmacology and clinical pharmacology, as well as the application of pharmacological concepts to the creation of anticancer drugs and biomarkers. Figg is presently an adjunct professor of medicine at Columbia University, Vagelos College of Physicians and Surgeons, Department of Medicine, Division of Oncology, New York, NY, and adjunct professor of surgery at Uniformed Services University, School of Medicine, Department of Surgery, Bethesda, MD. Additionally, Figg is a retired captain from the Commissioned Corps of the United States Public Health Service.

== Awards and honors ==
Figg has received awards including the Leon Goldberg Award from the American Society of Clinical Pharmacology and Therapeutics, the Allen J. Brands Award from United States Public Health Service, the Russell R. Miller Award and the Therapeutics Frontier Award from American College of Clinical Pharmacy, the Andrew Craigie Award from Association of Military Surgeons of the United States, the Reynold Spector Award in Clinical Pharmacology and Translational Medicine from the American Society of Pharmacology and Experimental Therapeutics, Distinguished Investigator Award from the American College of Clinical Pharmacology, the Philip C. and Ethel F. Ashby Lecture from the University of Oklahoma, the Sustained Contribution to the Scientific Literature Award from the American Society of Health-System Pharmacists Foundation, the Tyler Prize for Stimulation of Research from the American Pharmacists Association, the Charles Hatfield Lecture at Georgetown College, and the Albert Ebert Memorial Lecture University of Illinois. He has received the NIH's Clinical Center Director Award (2007, 2012, 2015), NCI's Outstanding Mentor Award (2008), and NIH's Director Merit Award (2011). Figg is a fellow of the American Colleges of Clinical Pharmacy and Clinical Pharmacology.
