= Figuier =

Figuier (French for "fig tree") is a French surname. Notable people with the surname include:

- Louis Figuier (1819–1894), French scientist and writer
- Romuald Figuier (1938–2026), French singer

== See also ==
- Gouais blanc
- Figuier's imaginary telectroscope
- Arboretum du Figuier, an experimental arboretum of fig trees located in Nézignan-l'Évêque, Hérault, Languedoc-Roussillon
