= Biowatch South Africa =

South African flag

South African regions

Biowatch South Africa is a non-profit, environmental justice NGO which aims to achieve food sovereignty and food justice for smallholder farmers. Biowatch researches, monitors, and publicizes issues around GMOs, as well as promotes biological diversity, biosafety, food sovereignty, and social justice. Biowatch formed in 1997 and was officially established in 1999. The organization works with community members and the government to ensure the protection of farmer's rights, as well as the continuation of sustainable and ethical food production systems. Biowatch encourages the advance of agroecological practices, hoping to advance farmers abilities and freedom while simultaneously protecting the environment.

Biowatch South Africa receives its funding from five primary donors located at both the national and international levels. In 2000, a 10 year long battle in court was launched between Biowatch and the South African government regarding access to information surrounding the use of genetically-modified organisms in South Africa. Biowatch refused to step down until they felt justice had been fully served in the name of public interests. Since 1999, the organization has released research papers, books, policy submissions, and other resources for the public to engage with and utilize.

== History ==
The South African sector of Biowatch was established in 1999. The organization's head office is located in Durban, and their rural office located in Mtubatuba. However, advocacy and research has occurred at both the local and global levels.

=== Aims and Principles ===
Biowatch works with other civil society organizations and the government to ensure that the people of South Africa have control over their food, agricultural resources and processes, as well as controlling other natural resources in a sustainable way in order to maintain biodiversity within the region. In order to achieve these goals, Biowatch supports policies which encourage agroecology, with hopes that the food production sector can make the best use of nature's goods and services without also damaging these valuable resources. BioWatch argues in favor of agroecology as a way of pushing back against the increase in greenhouse gas emissions that the current industrial food sector of production emits. From land clearing, to monocultures, to packaging, transportation and food waste, the industrial food sector produces nearly 50% of the world's greenhouse gas emissions. In addition to fighting against these current practices, Biowatch resists corporate ownership and exploitation of natural resources.

=== National and International Funders ===
Biowatch South Africa's funding primarily comes from five different programs. Brot für die Welt (Bread for the World) is a German, Protestant church organization committed to enabling smallholder farmers enough land to yield healthy food for their family throughout the year, as well as maintaining control over seeds. The National Lotteries Commission provides funding for the development of projects that increase South African people's well-being. The Swiss Agency for Development and Cooperation (SDC) focuses on development cooperation and policies to achieve social justice for all beneficiaries. The Global Environment Facility Small Grants Program provides financial and technological support to community-based initiatives aimed at bettering the environment. Lastly, the Thousand Currents program, a grassroots charity organization, promotes sustainable food production methods and protecting biodiversity, as well as prioritizing producers over shareholders and corporations.

=== Past & Current Efforts ===
Biowatch South Africa works with different communities, organizations, as well as the government to help protect farmer's rights. BioWatch is the founding partner and project holder of the regional Seed and Knowledge Initiative (SKI), which is a group of South African organizations committed to achieving food sovereignty.

Between 2000 and 2005, BioWatch researched and monitored the socioeconomic impact of genetically modified cotton, also known as Bt cotton, on small-scale farmers. BioWatch interviewed not only farmers, but also industry and government officials, as well as researchers educated in the topic. The study ultimately questioned the relationship between politics and economics, and highlighted how those with political power are often the ones who benefit from technological advances regarding GM content.

Currently, Biowatch is working with women in 5 different communities located in northern KwaZulu-Natal, at adapting to and achieving agroecological practices.

== GMOs in South Africa ==
South Africa was one of the first countries to become thoroughly involved in the production of genetically modified crops. In 1979, the apartheid government gathered a group of scientists educated in the genetic engineering of food, agriculture, and medicine, to form the South African Committee on Genetic Engineering (SAGENE). In 1989, the government decided to begin their first open trial experiments on GM crops, as suggested by SAGENE. Roughly 8 years later, the SAGENE drafted the GMO Act, allowing the production of genetically modified crops, which was passed by parliament in 1997, but not in effect until 1999. Yet, before the Act was even in effect, 178 permits were granted for open field trial experiments on a range of GMOs. Ever since the GMO Act went into effect, thousands of permits have been granted for the use of GMOs in South Africa. Various authorizations have been given to begin the growing of GM maize, GM cotton and GM soya, and millions of tons of GM maize has been imported intro the country from Argentina, effectively contaminating local maize.

In Africa today, South Africa remains the only country to have approved the commercial production of GM crops. According to the ISAAA, a biotech industry that tracks GM crops across the globe, South Africa was the 9th largest producer of GM crops in 2016, growing almost 2.7 million hectares of GMOs. For any foods that contain 5% or more GM content, a GMO label is mandatory for producers to include. Producers may voluntarily choose to label products where GM content is less than 5%, but they can even label something as not having GM content if there is less than 0.9%.

=== Biowatch on GMOs ===
Of all the environmental organizations, Biowatch remains the most active opponent of GMOs in South Africa, lobbying for appealing provisions of the GMO act. Biowatch argues that the regulation of GMOs in South Africa is inherently flawed, as it approves field trials and commercial release of crops that pose major health risks to the environment and the surrounding populations. According to research conducted, a large proportion of crop diversity has been lost and has become increasingly vulnerable to erosion. This loss of diversity contributes to an array of environmental and social issues, including diminished social cohesion, increased reliance on the cash crop economy, reduced ability to cope with external shocks, and the overall reduction of ecological resilience within the affected ecosystems.

One farmer interviewed by Biowatch, Thombithini Ndwandwe, states,

“As agroecology farmers we are independent and grow nutritious food for our families. But now the government is changing the laws on seed. We are worried that these new laws will take away our right as farmers to freely save, exchange, and sell seed and produce. Farmers have always saved and exchanged seed; and this is what makes our seed diverse and strong.”

However, these laws would directly violate the International Treaty on Plant Genetic Resources for Food and Agriculture. In section 9, the treaty states that nothing in the Article can be used to limit any rights that farmers have regarding saving, using, exchanging, or selling seed that was saved.

== Access to Information Court Case ==
The Biowatch South African court case was a 10 year long battle in court against the government of South Africa and Monsanto (a multinational agricultural biotechnology corporation) regarding access to information surrounding GMO usage in South Africa.

=== Background ===
In the post-apartheid era, the new constitution implemented in 1996 sought to increase transparency within South Africa by making access to information from the private sector a constitutional right for citizens. This was progress from the previously oppressive policies, which were exclusive along racial, ethnic, gender and religious lines. A report across five countries, based on a 2003 pilot study conducted by the Open Society Justice Initiative, shows that South Africa responded to only 23% of all access to information requests.

On 2 February 2000 the Promotion to Access of Information Act (PAIA) was implemented. The preamble states, "RECOGNISING THAT- * the system of government in South Africa before 27 April 1994, amongst others, resulted in a secretive and unresponsive culture in public and private bodies which often led to an abuse of power and human rights violations... AND IN ORDER TO- * foster a culture of transparency and accountability in public and private bodies by giving effect to the right of access to information; * actively promote a society in which the people of South Africa have effective access to information to enable them to more fully exercise and protect all of their rights."

=== Request for Access ===
In the same year that PAIA was enacted, Biowatch submitted 3 different requests throughout the year to the National Department of Agriculture (NDA), requesting access to information regarding GMO permits, permit applications, and risk assessments to using GMOs. Despite the government's recognition of lack of transparency, PAIA did not go into full effect until a year later in March 2001. The NDA responded with very little information which was deemed inadequate in fulfilling the requests of Biowatch, leading the organization to seek legal aid the following year, in 2001.

Biowatch's lawyers submitted several follow-ups with requests to access to information, with no substantial response given. The case was then brought to the high court in 2002, but was not heard for 2 more years until May 2004. When the case was finally presented, it was heard by Judge Justice Dunn in the Pretoria High Court (now renamed the North Gauteng High Court).

=== Final Ruling ===
On 23 February 2005 Dunn gave his final judgement, declaring,

“Biowatch sufficiently established its right to some of the information to which it sought access... The Registrar's refusal to grant access to this information thus constituted an infringement of Biowatch's rights under section 32 of the Constitution.”

According to the South African's Constitutional Bill of Rights, section 32 states that "everyone has the right of access to any information help by the state; and any information that is held by another person and that is required for the exercise or protection of any rights".

Although not brought up in court, section 24 also grants the rights to a safe environment, something that Biowatch argues GMOs inherently work against. The section states that "everyone has the right to an environment that is not harmful to their health or well-being; and to have the environment protected, for the benefit of present and future generations, through reasonable legislative and other measures that prevent pollution and ecological degradation; promote conservation; and secure ecologically sustainable development and use of natural resources while promoting justifiable economic and social development".

=== Response and Criticisms ===
For the first time in South African history, information surrounding the impacts of GM crops on environmental and social communities had become available to the public. This court case became notable due to its demonstration of the significance of good relations between the government and community members. Yet, Monsanto's director, Jocelyn Webster, felt that Biowatch had ulterior motives, “Biowatch’s aim is not to contribute to the scientific evaluation of GM technology but to maintain mass negative publicity to sway public opinion". Webster and the company claimed they had always been transparent with information, and voiced concerns towards the spread of misinformation.

Despite Biowatch winning the case, the judge ruled that Biowatch would pay Monsanto's legal costs, supposedly because Biowatch was too general in some of their requests for information, ultimately forcing Monsanto to join the case. However, it was clear that the wealthy corporation was not in need of the money, instead, Biowatch alleged that they were trying to put the organization effectively out of funding and business. Thus, Biowatch requested that Monsanto drop the costs. The appeal unfortunately did not pass, and Biowatch was forced to pay both the legal costs of Monsanto, as well as the legal costs of the appeal for the Minister of Agriculture, the Registrar of Genetic Resources, and the Executive Council for GMOs. Over the next 4 years, Biowatch appealed to the state and awaited what they felt was a just response, demanding that they not pay the legal costs over an issue that was voiced as a public concern. In 2009, the Constitutional Court judges announced that the previous courts had been misdirected in asking Biowatch to pay Monsanto's legal costs, and that the state should be held responsible for such costs. After a 10-year battle, this small environmental organization will go down in history for demonstrating the perseverance of individuals when it comes to upholding constitutional rights.

== Publications and Policy Work ==
Biowatch South Africa has worked extensively towards protecting farmers through policy submissions, research papers, direct action, and more. Between 2010 and 2018, the organization has completed and published 5 research papers surrounding the use of GMO's and its impact on communities. In 2012 the organization had a policy brief written. Between 2017 and 2019, Biowatch submitted 3 separate GM permit objections to the government. Since 2014, the organization has published 2 books, titled "A Landmark Victory for Justice" and "Agroecology Is Best Practice". Their online website also includes a compilation of crop information sheets, handouts, posters, and other fact sheets.

=== Policy Submissions ===
Between 2013 and 2019, Biowatch South Africa submitted 12 policy submissions to the government. These include the following:

- 14 June 2013: Plant Breeders' Rights Bill
- 14 June 2013: Draft Plant Improvement Policy and Bill
- 5 May 2015: Plant Improvement Bill
- 6 May 2015: Plant Breeders' Rights Bill
- 18 April 2017: Plant Breeders' Rights Bill
- 18 April 2017: Plant Improvement Bill
- 30 April 2018: Draft Conservation Agriculture Policy
- 27 July 2018: SA's Accession to the International Treaty on Plant Genetic Resources for Food and Agriculture and UPOV 1991 approval
- 8 August 2018: Climate Change Bill
- 2 October 2018: Draft Climate Smart Strategic Framework for Agriculture, Forestry and Fisheries
- 5 October 2018: National Policy on Comprehensive Producer Development Support
- 6 June 2019: Draft National Climate Change Adaption Strategy
