= Protaras =

Town in Famagusta District, Cyprus

Protaras Πρωταράς (Greek)
- Town
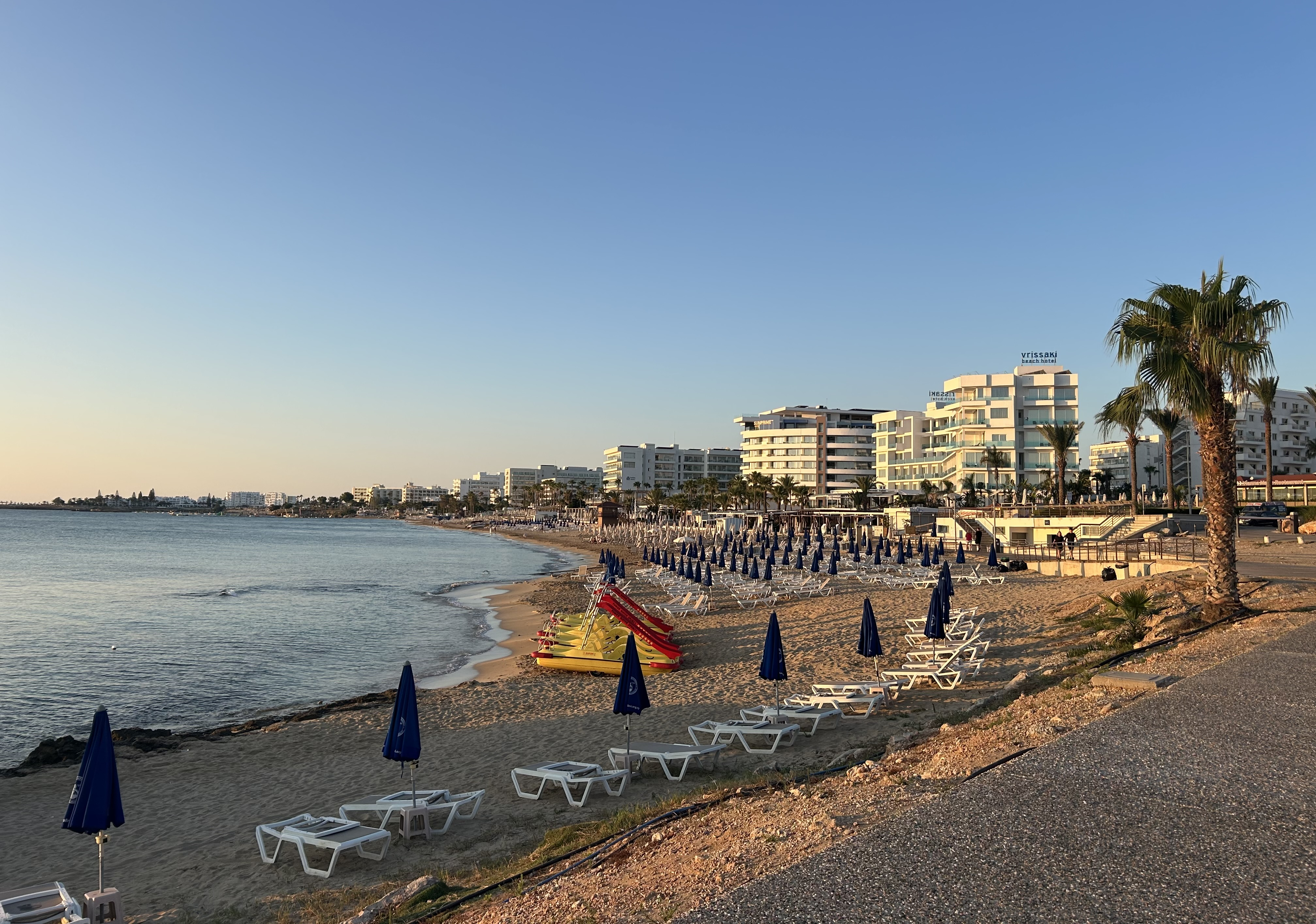
- Protaras beach (July 2026)

- Location in Cyprus
- Coordinates: 35°0′54″N 34°3′15″E
- Country: Cyprus
- District: Famagusta District

Population
  - Total: 20,230
- Time zone: UTC+2 (EET)
  - Summer (DST): UTC+3 (EEST)

Protaras (Greek: Πρωταράς) is a predominantly tourist resort that falls under the administrative jurisdiction of the Municipality of Paralimni in Cyprus. In ancient times, the area was home to the old city-state of Leukolla. The city had a small, safe harbour where Demetrius Poliorketes sought refuge in 306 BC, lying in wait for Ptolemy, one of the successors of Alexander the Great. In the ensuing battle, Ptolemy was defeated and fled to Egypt, leaving Cyprus briefly in Demetrius's hands. Protaras is also known as "the land of windmills" which preserves the nostalgic quality of the past.

Protaras has clear, sky-blue waters and sandy beaches, the best known of which is Fig Tree Bay. Building on the success of Ayia Napa, located about 10 km (6 mi) to the southwest, it has expanded into a modern holiday resort of considerable size with dozens of high-capacity hotels, hotel apartments, villas, restaurants, pubs and associated facilities. Being quieter than Ayia Napa and having less of a club scene, it has a reputation for catering more to families and domestic Cypriot tourism. Cape Greco is a 10-minute drive from the centre of Protaras.

Protaras is a popular diving destination. Green Bay is the most popular dive site and features underwater statues for thousands of first-timers divers to enjoy while practising their scuba skills. Other notable dive sites include The Blue Hole, The Chapel, Decosta Bay, and Malama Bay. Protaras's most famous technical diving site is the Cyclops Bay, located on the border with Ayia Napa.
