= Fig Tree Bay =

Sandy beach in Protaras of Paralimni in Cyprus

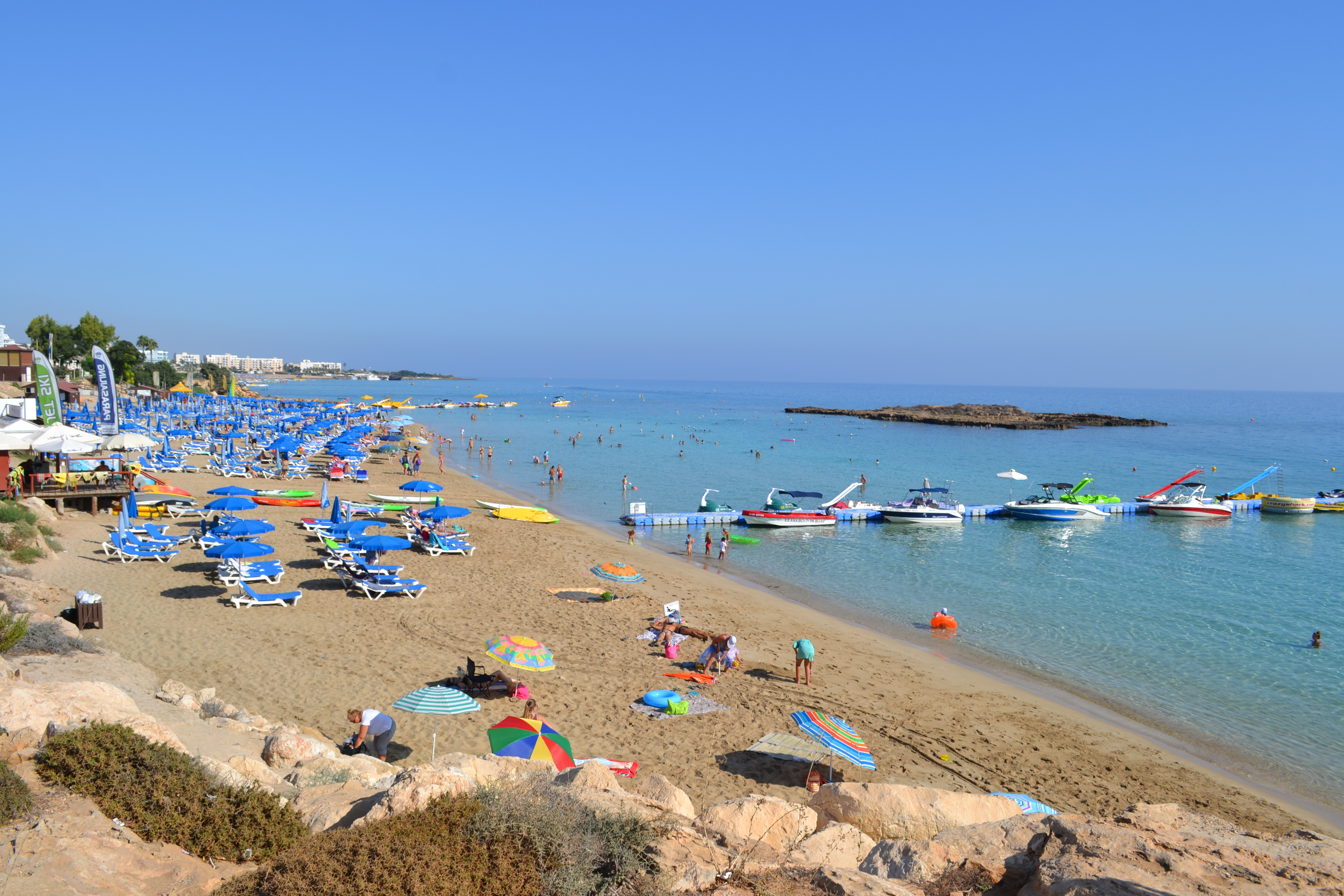
- August 2016

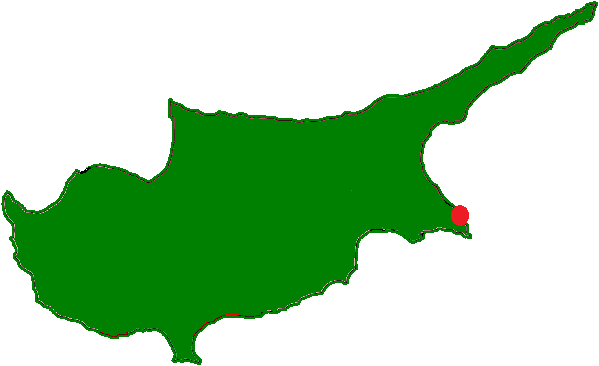

- Location within Cyprus
- Location: Protaras, Cyprus
- Coordinates: 35.0128°N 34.0589°E
- Ocean/sea sources: Mediterranean Sea

Fig Tree Bay is a beach in Protaras, Cyprus. It was named Europe's third best beach by TripAdvisor in 2011, though it had dropped to 13th place by 2013. On the coast of the beach stands a 17th-century fig tree, after which the beach was named.

== Overview ==
As with all beaches in Cyprus, access to the public is free, whilst the hiring of sunbeds and umbrellas is chargeable. A municipal car park provides parking within a short walk. The beach stretches for 500 metres, and the waters are clean enough for the beach to have been awarded blue flag designation. The beach takes its name from the fig trees located close to the coast.

There is an uninhabited islet easily reached by swimming through the shallow waters, the location of which provides a good shelter for the rest of the beach. The islet is covered with low-level local vegetation. In contrast to other local beaches, such as nearby Nissi, Fig Tree Bay has become a popular destination for families. Water sports such as water-skiing, windsurfing, and parasailing are available. From April to October, lifeguards and lifesaving equipment are available on the beach from 9am to 6pm.

In 2010, during structural improvements to the beach, an ancient Greek tomb was unearthed.

In 2018, the Paralimni municipality pumped ocean sand onto the shoreline to prevent erosion.

== In popular culture ==
The song "Fig Tree Bay" from English musician Peter Frampton's 1972 album Wind of Change is about the beach.
