= Gold Rush (Slagharen) =

Steel roller coaster in the Netherlands

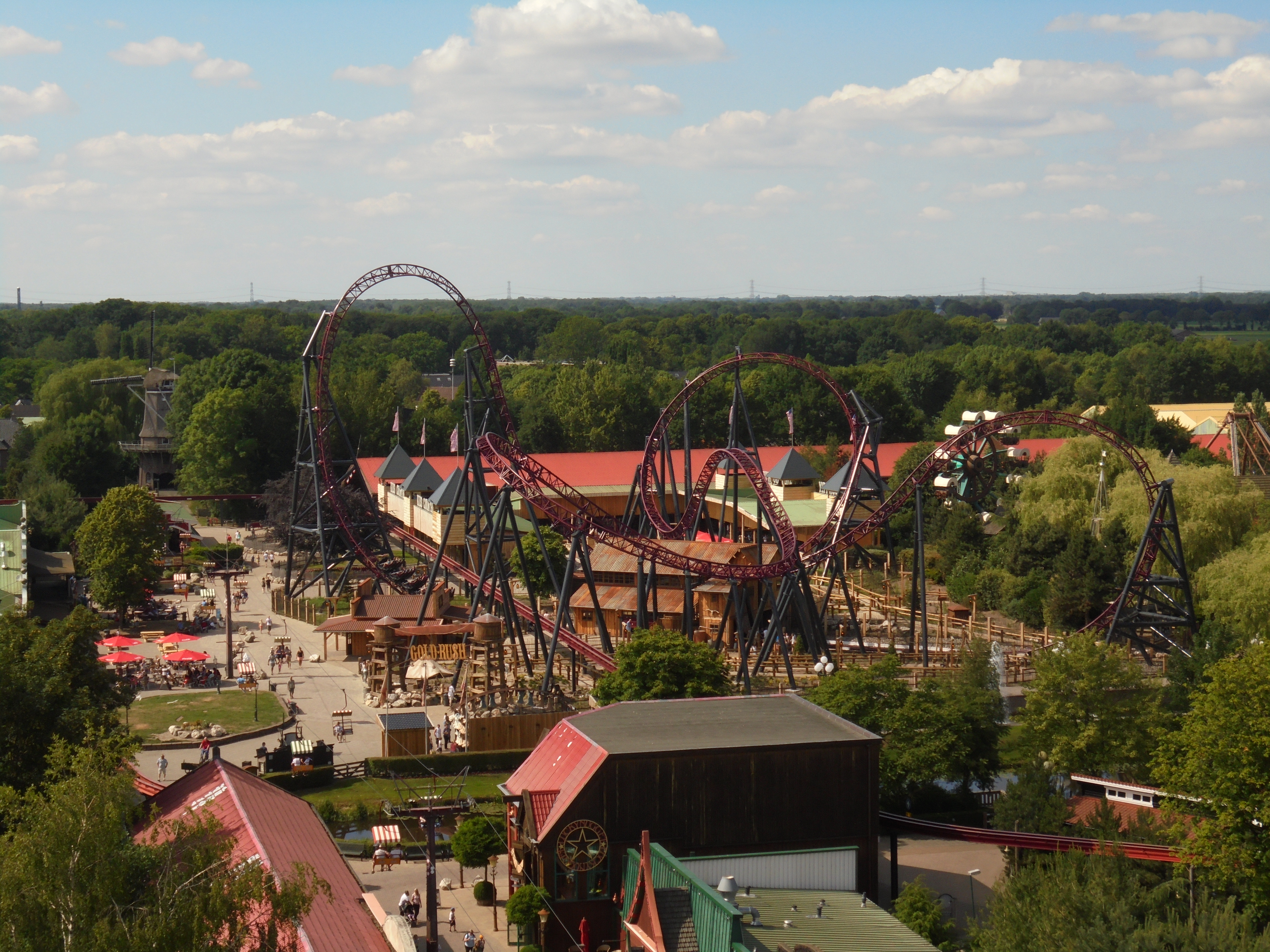

Attractiepark Slagharen
- Location: Attractiepark Slagharen
- Coordinates: 52.624357°N 6.561886°E
- Status: Operating
- Opening date: April 13, 2017
- Cost: €5,000,000
- Replaced: Thunder Loop

General statistics
- Type: Steel – Launched
- Manufacturer: Gerstlauer
- Model: Infinity Coaster
- Lift/launch system: LSM launch
- Height: 108.3 ft (33.0 m)
- Speed: 59 mph (95 km/h)
- Inversions: 2
- Capacity: 800 riders per hour
- Height restriction: 130 cm (4 ft 3 in)
- Trains: Single train with 5 cars. Riders are arranged 4 across in a single row for a total of 20 riders per train.
- Physical Length: 1,312.3 feet (400.0 m)
- Total length Traversed: 2,034.1 feet (620.0 m)
- Official Website: Official website
- Gold Rush at RCDB

Gold Rush is a steel launched roller coaster at Attractiepark Slagharen in Slagharen, Overijssel, of the Netherlands. The coaster is manufactured by Gerstlauer and replaced the aging Thunder Loop attraction, which now operates in Cyprus. Gold Rush is heavily themed to the 1849 California Gold Rush, and features the first (and currently only) triple launch system on a Dutch roller coaster.

== History ==
On June 10, 2016, Attractiepark Slagharen announced that they would retire Thunder Loop, their classic Schwarzkopf Looping Star coaster, which had been in operation since 1979. For those familiar with the park, the announcement came to no surprise, as in the years prior the deteriorating Thunder Loop had become an increasingly costly and often unpredictable asset, having failed multiple technical inspections during that time. Slagharen director Wouter Dekkers stated on multiple occasions that the attraction had long been on the nomination list for removal, but was kept in operation solely because of the park's need to have a major anchor coaster. Because of this factor, park officials also promised to construct a major new replacement coaster for the 2017 season, which would have a western theme to fit in with the park and occupy a larger footprint.

The park would gradually release select details of the replacement attraction over the summer of 2016. In August, it was reported that the ride would be named Gold Rush and be manufactured by German firm Gerstlauer, with leaked snippets of hardware renderings finding their way onto the internet. Gold Rush was formally announced and unveiled on September 8, 2016, packing in two inversions and a triple launch system that was a first for the Netherlands. Thunder Loop's final day of operations was on October 2, after which it was dismantled and sold off. The attraction was refurbished and sent to Parko Paliatso in Cyprus, where it began operation in 2018 and today operates under the name Looping Star.

In January 2017, Gold Rush's track and other hardware began to arrive, and the dive loop became the first part of the coaster to go vertical in mid-February. The rest of the ride quickly followed and was completed within the month, with the single train arriving on March 16, 2017. Testing, landscaping, and the application of many of the themed elements was undertaken soon after.

Gold Rush officially opened to great public fanfare on April 13, 2017. A week after its debut, however, Slagharen officials closed the attraction indefinitely, citing weak concrete foundations that would require significant reinforcement. The ride reopened to the public a week later on April 27, 2017. For the 2026 season, a new single rider queue was constructed, allowing for ride attendants to fill open seats with lone guests.

== Characteristics ==
=== Statistics ===
Gold Rush is 108.3 feet (33.0 m) tall, 1,312.3 feet (400.0 m) long, and reaches a top speed of 59 mph (95 km/h). Despite the shorter physical track length, the coaster train traverses approximately 2,034.1 feet (620.0 m) of track both forwards and backwards. The coaster operates a single train with five cars, each seating four riders in a single row for a total of 20 passengers per ride. Combined with a short ride time and quick operations, Gold Rush can accommodate an advertised 800 riders per hour. As a result of the single train operation, the train is able to pass through the station multiple times, and does so on the Linear Synchronous Motor launch.

=== Contractors ===
Gerstlauer was chosen to manufacture the coaster, as they had the ability to develop major quality projects in a relatively short amount of time. Gold Rush is one of their Infinity Coaster models. The ride was constructed by European construction firm RCS GmbH, who specialized in roller coaster installation across Europe, and the attraction theming was designed by Dutch design firm P&P Projects.

=== Theme ===
The coaster is themed generically around the California Gold Rush of 1849, when sawmill operator James W. Marshall discovered gold at Sutter's Mill in Coloma, California. the coaster spoofs a wild Steam locomotive that serves as a new method of transportation to service the gold rush. Various theming elements can be found throughout the attraction's massive winding queue, with the general area dressed up as an abandoned expedition camp.

== Ride experience ==
Riders are launched out of the station, and roll part of the way up the coaster's top hat. Without enough speed to make it anywhere near the 108.3-foot (33.0 m) peak, the train rolls back and is accelerated backwards by the launch, passing through the station and rolling partway up the dive loop. The train rolls forwards once again and is launched for the third and final time through the station at 59 mph (95 km/h), gaining enough speed to crest the twisted top hat, passing over top of the Monorail and into a "sling loop" (which is seen as a slightly extended Sidewinder inversion). The coaster navigates a camelback airtime hill and a right-hand overbooked helix (crossing over the Monorail once again), before entering the dive loop into the launch area once again. The brakes slow the train down and quickly guide it back into the station, bring the train to a complete stop. One full cycle of the ride lasts just under 45 seconds.
