= Ayia Napa =

Ayia Napa: Αγία Νάπα (Greek); Aya Napa (Turkish); Agia Napa
- Municipality
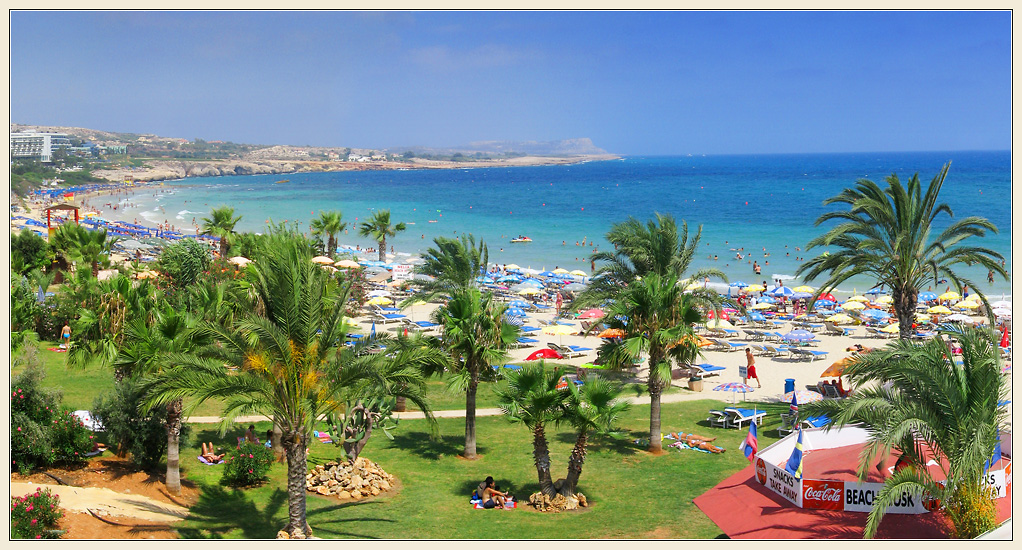
- A beach in Ayia Napa seen from a hotel room with Cape Greco in the distance

- Location of Ayia Napa within Cyprus
- Coordinates: 34.98°N 34.00°E
- Country: Cyprus
- District: Famagusta District

Government
  - Mayor: Christos Zannetou

Area
  - Total: 12.150 sq mi (31.469 km^{2})

Population (2001)
  - Total: 3,200 (year round); 40,000 (active)
- Time zone: UTC+2 (EET)
  - Summer (DST): UTC+3 (EEST)
- Area code: 5330
- Website: http://www.ayianapa.org.cy/

Ayia Napa (Greek: Αγία Νάπα; Turkish: Aya Napa, locally [aˈʝanːapa]), officially romanised Agia Napa, is a tourist resort at the far eastern end of the southern coast of Cyprus.

== Etymology ==
The name Ayia Napa is derived from a Venetian-era monastery of the same name, in the centre of the town, next to the square that today is the clubbing centre. The word Ayia means "holy" in Greek. Napa is archaic and means "wooded valley" or "dell". In ancient times the area surrounding the town was covered with thick forest.

== Geography ==
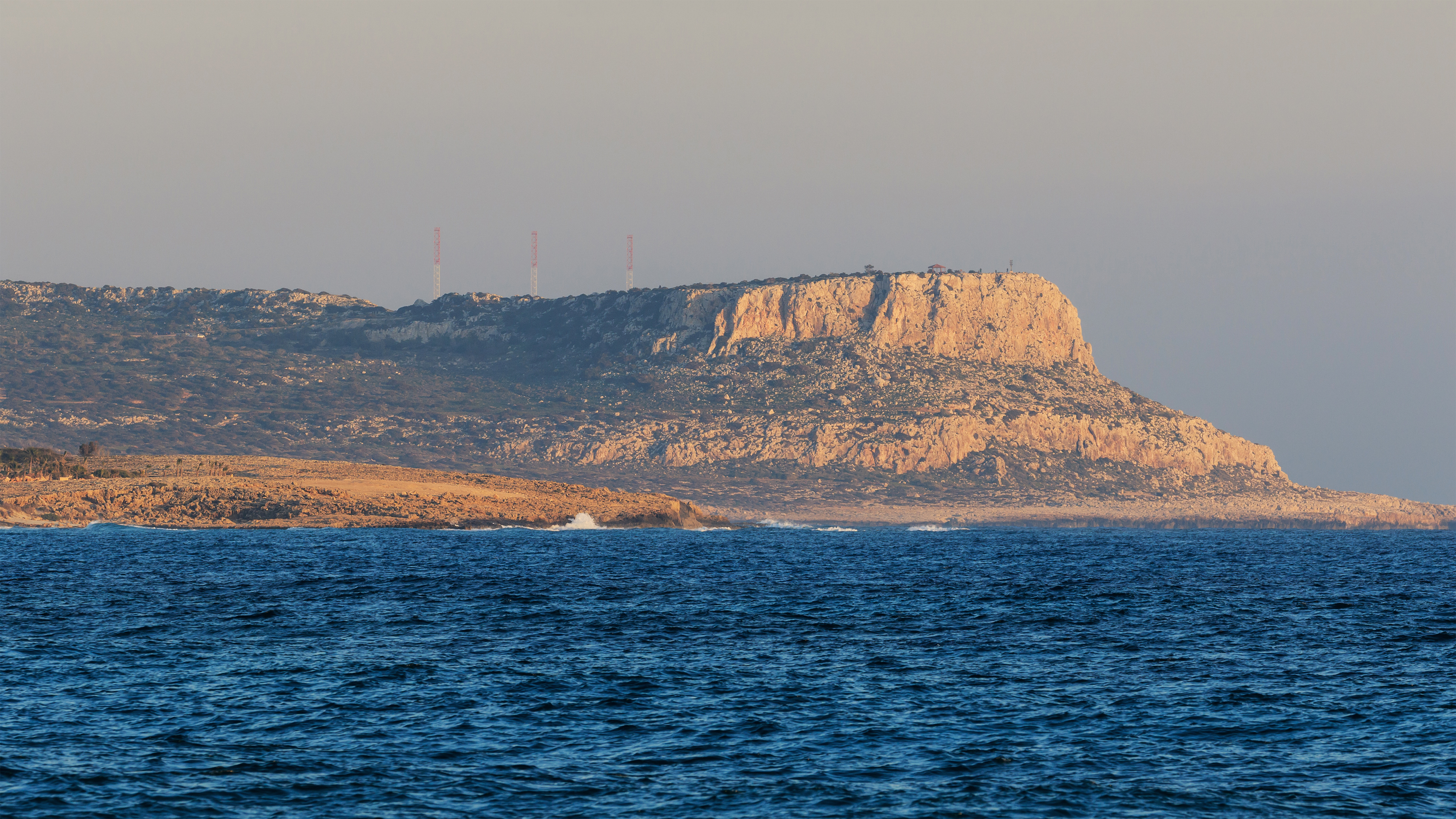
Cape Greco

Ayia Napa lies near Cape Greco at the eastern part of Cyprus, south of Famagusta, and forms part of a larger area known as Kokkinochoria ("Red Villages", a name derived from the vivid red colour of the soil). It is in the remaining Republic of Cyprus-controlled portion of Famagusta District. Ayia Napa is about 12 kilometres (7.5 miles) from Protaras, which has also been developed as a tourist destination.

== History ==
According to a local legend, a hunter in pursuit of his prey discovered an icon of the Virgin Mary in a cave, after which a monastery dedicated to her was built around the cave; the name Virgin Mary of Napa was eventually shortened to Ayia Napa. Another legend has it that a Venetian noblewoman fled from her parents, who forbade her from marrying a commoner, to live there as a nun. The Venetians built a church in c. 1500. According to local tradition, the area (except for the monastery) was uninhabited until about 1790, when Nikolaos Kemitzis of Thessaloniki arrived from Greece and settled in the village of Panayia, located in the northeastern part of Ayia Napa. Kemitzis had come into conflict with the Ottoman authorities who then ruled Cyprus, and decided to move near the monastery of Ayia Napa.

Between 1999 and 2003, Ayia Napa was the UK garage music summer holiday destination, attracting DJ Spoony, MC Creed, MC DT, Norris "Da Boss" Windross, Kele Le Roc, MC CKP, Little Charlie, and So Solid Crew.

In 2014, Ayia Napa was given the status of a main city-urban centre by the Government of Cyprus, in recognition of its importance to the economy. This was credited to the efforts of Mayor Yiannis Karousos, elected in March 2013. The city of Ayia Napa has the seventh largest budget of the 30 active municipalities of Cyprus, and employs 280 people.

== Government ==
The City of Ayia Napa is governed by a mayor, an alderman, and a six-member city council; Christos Zannettou was elected mayor in January 2020. It is well known for its municipal management, which has influenced that of other local authorities in Cyprus.

=== Public beaches ===
Until the end of 2014, beaches in Cyprus were under the management of private individuals and companies which were given licences to manage the beaches directly and without public tenders. Mayor Yiannis Karousos led an initiative to place all the city's beaches under direct city management. Ηe and the councillors who voted for the proposal faced threats and legal actions, but as of 2018 the city received over 3.5 million euros in annual revenue from beaches, and all beaches in Cyprus are now managed by the local authorities.

=== Participatory budget ===
In October 2017, the city decided that €240,000 of its development budget will be allocated to projects proposed and chosen by citizens and organisations of Ayia Napa, becoming the first city in Cyprus to implement a participatory budget.

=== Live webcast ===
In January 2017, Ayia Napa become the first city council in Cyprus to transmit a live webcast of its council meetings.

=== Annual survey ===
Starting in 2017, the city instituted an annual survey of citizens, businesses, and visitors evaluating the city and giving feedback.

=== City improvement app ===
Through an online app, citizens and visitors can report issues and make complaints and track how long it takes the city to fix the problem.

=== Blockchain and smart city ===
On 2 May 2018, the city signed an agreement with the University of Nicosia under which the university will act as consultant to the city in implementing blockchain technology, artificial intelligence, and smart city utilities; it is the first city in Cyprus to implement blockchain technology.

== Tourism ==
=== Overview ===
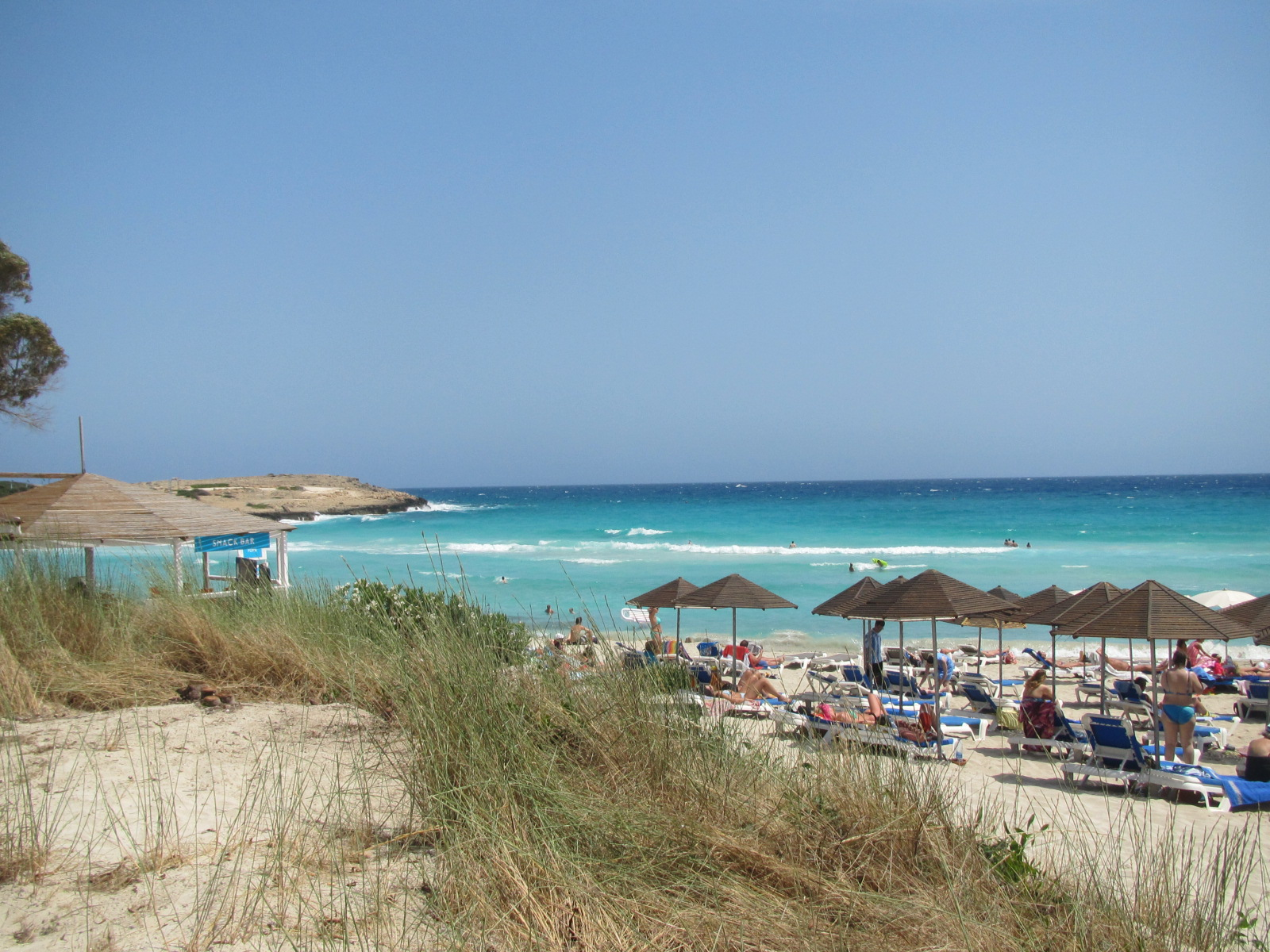
Nissi Beach

Ayia Napa is the largest tourist resort in Cyprus, with a 27,000-person-bed capacity and more than 175 hotels and apartments of all sizes. In 2017, the resort received over 700,000 tourists and accommodated 5 million overnight stays, representing approximately 30% of all overnight stays in Cyprus.

Beginning in the 2010s, under Mayor Yiannis Karousos, the city has sought to expand tourist offerings and declared an aim of discouraging rowdy groups of young tourists and becoming "the best and most cosmopolitan tourist resort of the Mediterranean" by 2030. Since 2013, it has shut down problematic establishments, upgraded infrastructure, hotels, and restaurants, and added facilities such as a new marina and the underwater museum. The vision set by the city is supported by the Cyprus Tourism Strategy, which was completed in March 2017 and aims for Ayia Napa to be "regarded as one of Europe's top three beach and nightclubbing holiday destinations [...] offering the best beach and marine experience in Cyprus for young adults, complemented by international standard beach clubs and nightlife". The strategy evaluated the then quality of Ayia Napa as 3.4/5 and proposed that it should plan to increase its quality to 4.4/5.

Ayia Napa was recognised as a Prime City Destination by the Oxford Business Assembly, and in 2018 was awarded the International flag of investment and innovation attractiveness "Flag of Europe" and the International Certificate of Excellence in Investment and Innovation.

=== Beaches ===
The resort has 27 beaches, of which 14 have been awarded the Blue Flag award, more than any other resort in Cyprus; the island itself has the second highest amount of Blue Flags in the world, behind only Croatia. In 2011, Nissi Beach topped the TripAdvisor list of the best beaches in Europe. In 2017, Makronissos Beach was chosen by Travel Weekly as the third best beach for Cyprus and Greece. In 2018, it was announced that Nissi Beach ranked third in the list of the most popular beaches on Instagram. A CNN feature ranked Nissi Beach as the best beach to visit for the month of July 2018.

=== Marina ===
The foundation stone for Ayia Napa Marina was laid on 30 September 2016. It was the largest private project in Cyprus at the time and is expected to cost €250 million and be completed in 2021. The main investor is Egyptian billionaire Naguib Sawiris, who was presented with a golden key to the city by Mayor Yiannis Karousos at the foundation ceremony.

== Cultural sites and events ==
=== Sites ===
Ayia Napa Monastery is the main point of historical interest in the Ayia Napa area. The oldest parts of the existing monastery are some wall sections from the Middle Byzantine era (before 1191); most of the buildings are from the 14th–18th centuries. It now houses a museum.

The Makronissos Tombs are an archaeological site consisting of set of ancient rock-cut tombs, an adjacent sanctuary and quarry, and evidence of funeral pyres.

The town contains two municipal marine museums: the Tornaritis-Pierides Museum of Marine Life and the Thalassa Agia Napa Municipal Museum (also known as the Thalassa Museum of the Sea). The former, founded in 1992, displays marine fossils, specimens, and dioramas. The latter, founded in 2005, displays the "marine heritage of Cyprus, from prehistoric times to the present" and features a full-scale replica of a c. 300 BCE merchant ship which was salvaged during the 1960s.

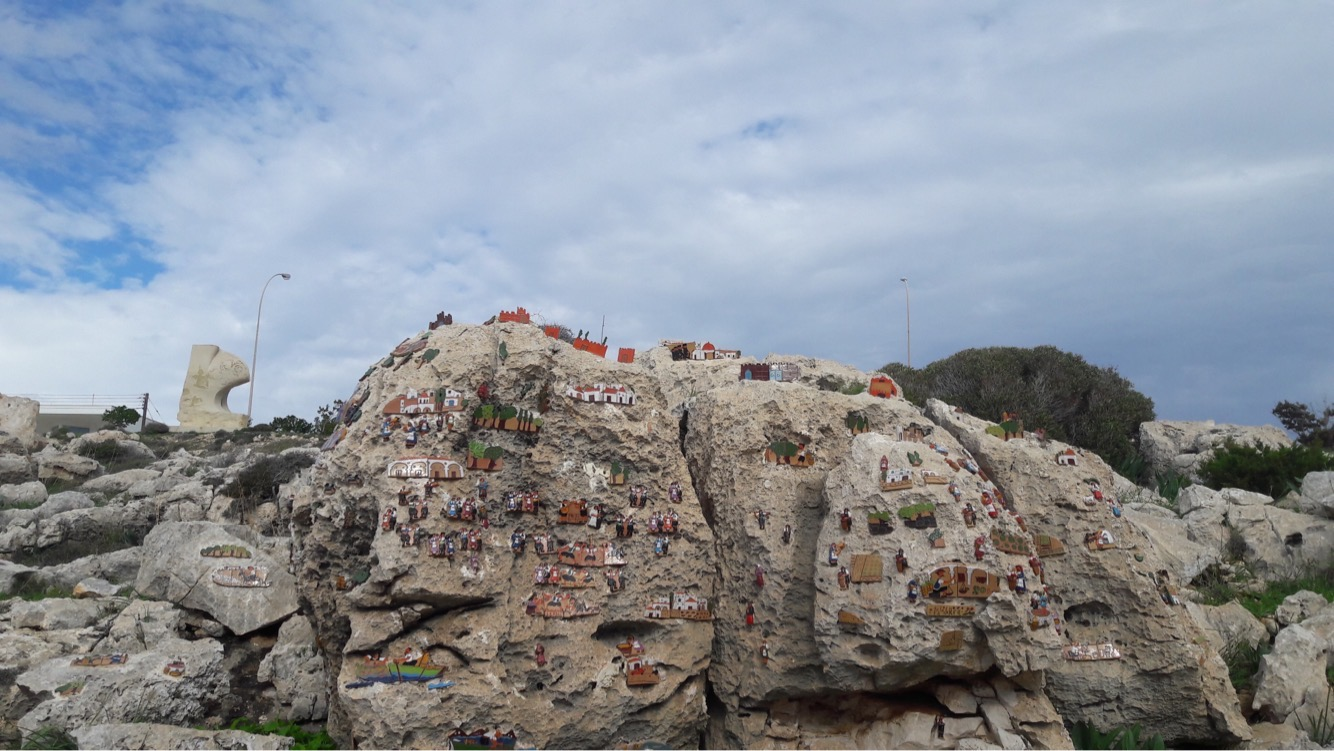
Sculpture by Christos Askotis and Loizos Sergiou, Ayia Napa Sculpture Park

The Ayia Napa Sculpture Park, on the east side of the city, was inaugurated in May 2014 with 17 sculptures. By January 2018 it included more than 200 sculptures by 140 sculptors from all over the world. The sculpture park was accepted as a member to the International Sculpture Symposium Alliance, and has been turned into an international attraction, with the participation of artists from all over the world.

The Museum of Underwater Sculptures Ayia Napa, with 93 works by British sculptor Jason deCaires Taylor off Pernera Beach, opened in 2021. Sculptures are at a depth of 8–10 metres (26–33 ft), accessible to both snorkellers and scuba divers. It is the first of its kind in the Mediterranean.

=== Monuments ===
The Fisherman of Ayia Napa, inaugurated in June 2015, is dedicated to the fishermen of the world. The population of Ayia Napa once consisted of mainly fishermen and farmers.

The Mermaid of Ayia Napa, a sculpture at the harbour inaugurated in 2015, was inspired by the poetry of George Seferis and by the legendary sister of Alexander the Great. She has two tails.

The Farmer of Ayia Napa, inaugurated in July 2016 in a square created on Yiannaki Pappoulis Street as part of the initiatives to improve the city centre.

Kemitzides, the Family of Ayia Napa, a group of three statues donated to the city by five local families and inaugurated in September 2016: a man in Greek dress, a classic Cypriot woman, and a child, commemorating the founding family of the city and symbolising their continuation.

From Yorgopotamos to El Alamein, dedicated to the citizens of Ayia Napa who participated in the World Wars and was inaugurated in October 2016 in the presence of the Minister of Defence.

=== Festivals ===
The Ayia Napa International Festival, first held in September 1985, is held annually in Seferis Square in Ayia Napa Monastery, usually over the last weekend of September. The festivities reflect the historic, cultural and agricultural traditions of Ayia Napa and Cyprus as a whole. The programme includes theater performances, operas, concerts, and Cypriot and foreign folk dancing. Visitors can also enjoy art and photo exhibitions, wood carving and silversmithing workshops, and culinary shows with halloumi cheese making.

The Ayia Napa Youth Festival was established in 2010 when the Ayia Napa Youth Council accepted the proposal of its president Yiannis Karousos and decided to organise a festival similar to the large music festivals of Europe. The first festival took place at the harbour square and received more than 10,000 visitors over three days; bands included the Greek reggae act Locomondo, pop-rock band MPLE, and hip hop band Stavento featuring Ivi Adamou. In 2011, the festival became international and included Stratovarius, Sabaton, Rotting Christ, Nightstalker, and other bands from across Europe. The third Ayia Napa Youth Festival took place in 2012.

=== Greek dancing world record ===
On 16 September 2007, following the proposal of Yiannis Karousos, President of the Ayia Napa Tourism Committee, the world's longest chain of syrtaki dancers danced in synchronised step to "Zorba's Dance" (from the 1964 film Zorba the Greek) in a successful attempt to enter the Guinness Book of World Records. The chain had a total of 268 members of eight dancing groups. Ayia Napa mayor Antonis Tsokkos said the aim of the event was to send the message that the area was interested in Greek culture and to promote the tourist resort abroad. The event drew the attention of tourists and locals, many of whom danced on the beach and in the sea.

== Points of interest ==
=== Amusement parks ===
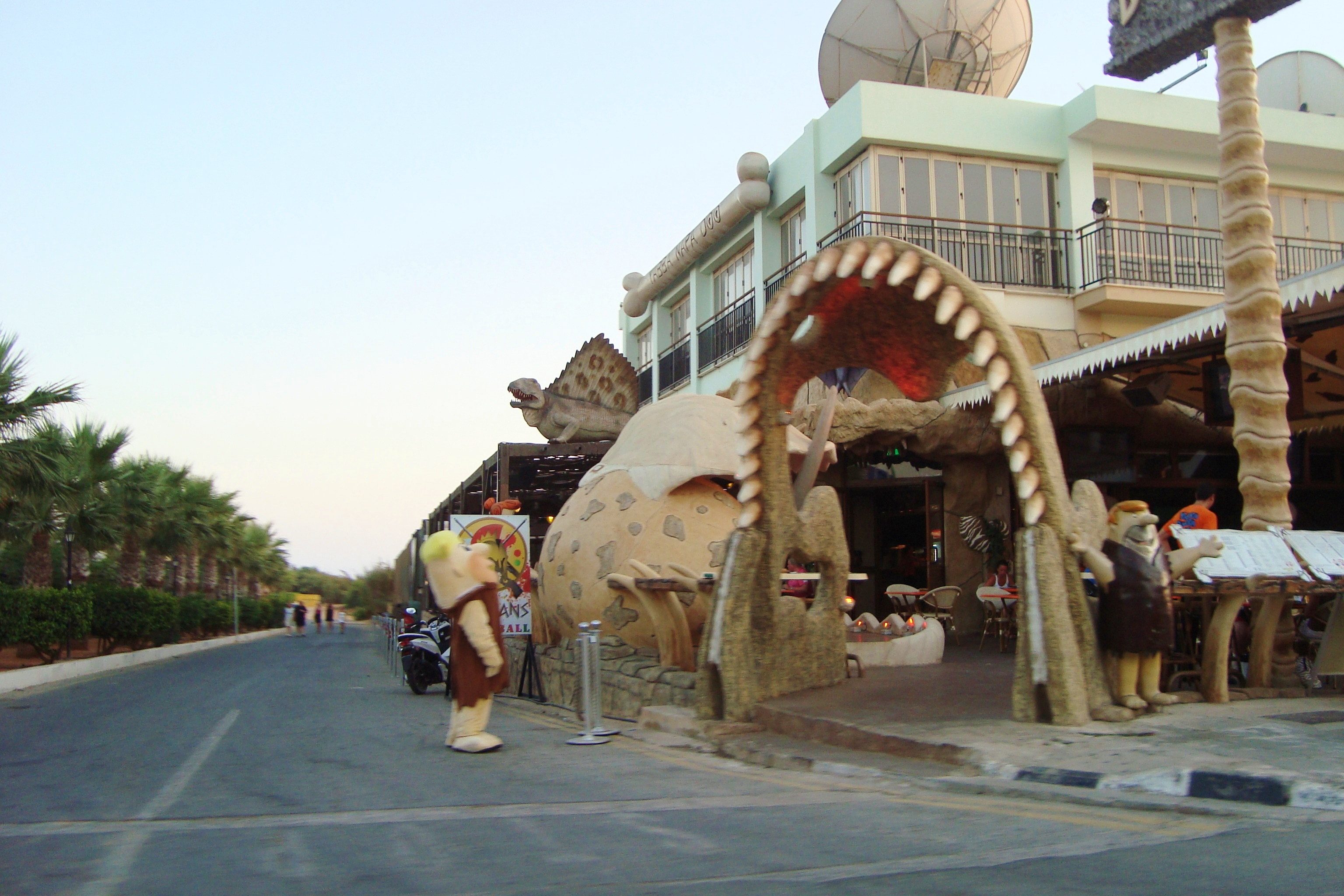
Flintstones themed cafeteria in Ayia Napa

The town has an amusement park called Parko Paliatso and a water park called WaterWorld. WaterWorld has a theme of Ancient Greece, and opened on 6 May 1996.

=== Artificial reef ===
The main interest point inside the artificial reef is the Kyrenia Ship, which was donated by the Ministry of Defense to Ayia Napa. Other underwater sculptures are also located in the reef. It was inaugurated in February 2015.

=== Cactus Park ===
Located next to the sculpture park, the cactus park was created with voluntary work and includes more than 10,000 cacti and desert plants.

=== Cape Greco Environmental and Educational Centre ===
The centre provides information and education in association with the national park of Cape Greco, a Nature 2000 protected area. It was inaugurated in May 2017.

=== Fishing boats roundabout ===
To create positive feelings when entering the city, old fishing boats have been placed on the first main roundabout of Ayia Napa.

=== Sculpture Park ===
The sculpture park in Ayia Napa is free to visit. The park covers approximately 20,000 m^{2} (220,000 sq ft). It is a "large collection of pieces by over 50 artists from around the world who have participated in the annual Sculpture Symposium held by Agia Napa Municipality. The expansion of the collection is an ongoing project that is continually being added to ..."

== Twin towns ==
Ayia Napa is twinned with:

- Mellieħa, Malta
- Byblos, Lebanon
- Guangzhou, China
- Ivanovo, Russia
- Minsk, Belarus
- Ioannina, Greece
- Rethymno, Greece
- Serres, Greece
- Gelendzhik, Russia
- Metallostroy, Russia
