= Attractiepark Slagharen =

Theme park in Hardenberg, the Netherlands

Attractie- & Vakantiepark Slagharen
- Previously known as Ponypark Slagharen

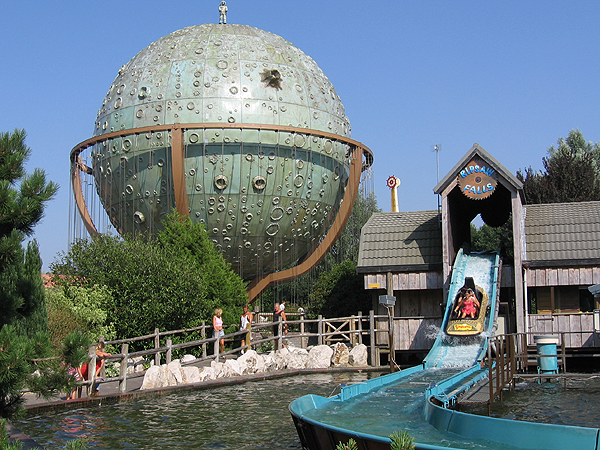
- Interactive map of Attractie- & Vakantiepark Slagharen
- Location: Slagharen, Netherlands
- Coordinates: 52°37′28″N 6°33′43″E
- Opened: 1963
- Owner: (Spain) Parques Reunidos
- Theme: Wild west
- Slogan: Het avontuur gaat door! (The adventure continues)
- Attendance: 1.052.568 (2017)
- Area: 83 ha (210 acres)

Attractions
- Total: 35
- Roller coasters: 2
- Water rides: 4
- Website: http://www.slagharen.com/

Attractie- & Vakantiepark Slagharen is an Amusement park and holiday resort in Slagharen, Netherlands. The park opened in 1963 and was originally named Ponypark Slagharen. The logo contains the English name Slagharen Themepark & Resort.

The Amusement park contains two areas, which are connected by a main street containing shops and restaurants. The park has more than 30 attractions, including 2 Roller coasters. The park contains 6 themed areas: Indian, Yellowstone, New Orleans, Mexican, Wild West and Jules Adventureland (named after the French writer Jules Verne).

The entrance and Apollo, Enterprise and Free Fall rides are all found at the southern end of the park. Whilst, the larger roller coasters including Gold Rush, Wild West Adventure and Tomahawk rides are at the northern end of the park. The flour mill built in 1859 named De Pionier can also be found at the northern end of the park.

Adjacent to the main street is the ferris wheel and the Sky Tower. A cable car suspended above the main street connects the different areas of the park and has a number of stations including those located within the Apollo and Kids Country.

Within the park, there are a number of mobile homes and bungalows for visitors to stay in. The park expanded to include an area with tipi tents and a water park named Sunny Beach. The park further expanded in 2002 to include a campground.

== History ==
=== 1960s ===
In 1963 a shopkeeper named Henk Bemboom built some vacation homes on a piece of farmland around an old farmhouse in Slagharen. As an extra attraction he offered every vacation home a Shetland pony and a small carriage. During Pentecost the holiday park opened with twenty-four homes. During this time Shetland ponies were a rare sight in the Netherlands. Because of this, the park gained a lot of attention. The following year the amount of homes doubled. A further large outdoor swimming pool and play area was added.

During 1965, development started on the amusement park. For the enjoyment of the guests of the park, fairground rides were placed in the park. A theater with a Water organ and distorting mirrors were added. The holiday park was expended to 100 homes.

In 1966 Sulky was added in addition to a pony track, a bowling-ally and a Diorama.

In 1968 a Dark ride opened named "Nautilus". This has now been broken down. When it first opened, the ride was named Onderwaterwereld. This served as the third large attraction in the park. the holiday park also expanded further. In 1967 it already contained 160 homes. In 1969 Bumper cars and a Calypso were added. This ride was broken down in 2013.

=== 1970s ===
The holiday park was further expanded to a total of 171 homes in 1970, 183 in 1971 and 302 in 1972. Furthermore, a large restaurant was opened in 1971.

In the years following the park expanded to become an amusement park. In 1972 Bemboom introduced the principle of a ticket were you would pay once and get unlimited access to all the attractions. Previously visitors would have to pay for every ride. In 1973 the rides Octopus (renamed to "El Torito" in 2016) and Weens Reuzenrad (Ferris wheel) were added to the park. Weens Reuzenrad was later replaced by Chuck Wagon. A large slide named the Mountain Slide was added to the park in 1974. The same year The Lunik was built in the park. In 1975 the park acquired a secondhand 28 meter high watchtower named Zeppelin. In the same year 25 new homes were added to the holiday park.

In 1976 a kind of carousel themed after the landing on to moon was added to the park, which was then named Apollo 14. The same year the Dombomolen was added. This year the cable car was also constructed. 5 kilometers away from the park, two holiday parks were built with 185 homes (including ponies).

In 1977 a small Carousel, named Merry Go Mad, was added to the park. A new ponyhal, shooting range (Shooting gallery) and the slightly larger rides Enterprise and Tomahawk (a Troika) were also built.

A large monorail was built in the park in 1978. Its track reached almost everywhere in the park. The same year the film theater named El Teatro opened. This film theater has now been transformed into a 4D cinema. In 1979 the large roller coaster named Looping Star (later demolished in 2016) was built. This was the first roller coaster featuring a loop in the Netherlands. Furthermore, in the same year the fifty-meter-high Ferris wheel, Big Wheel was built and Rodeo Rider was added.

== Attractions ==
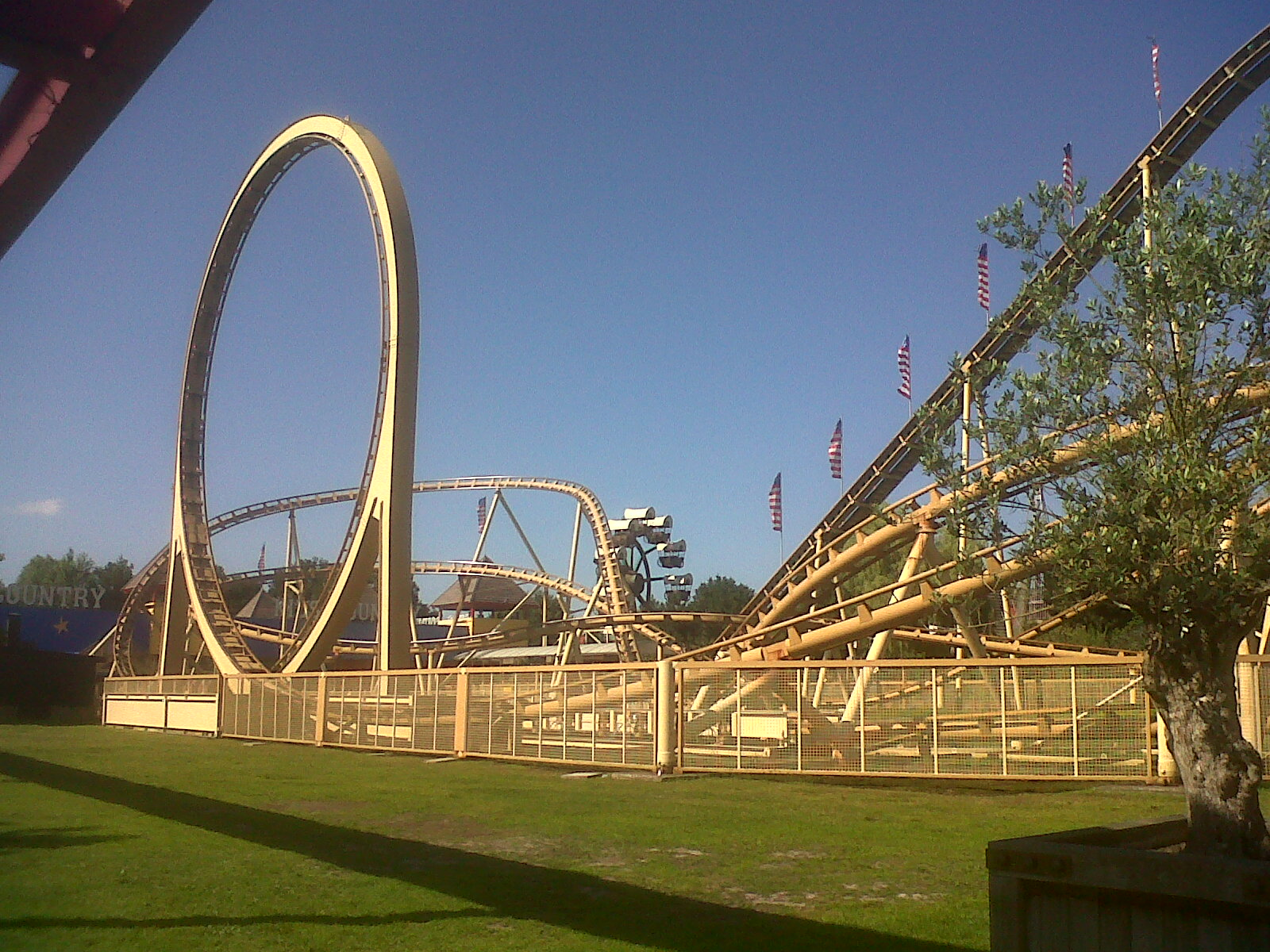
Thunder Loop

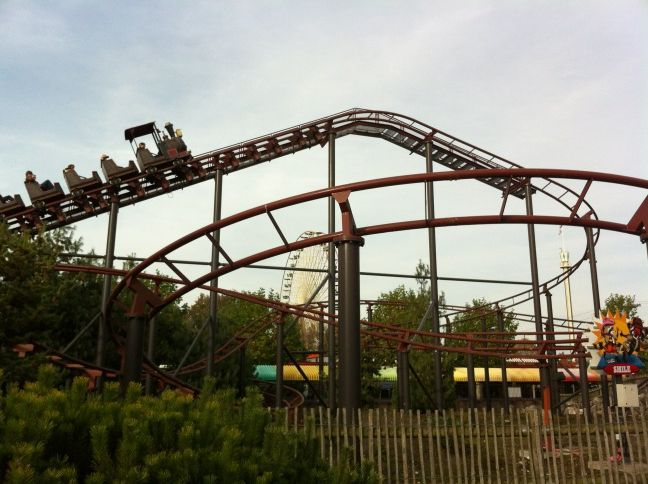
Mine Train

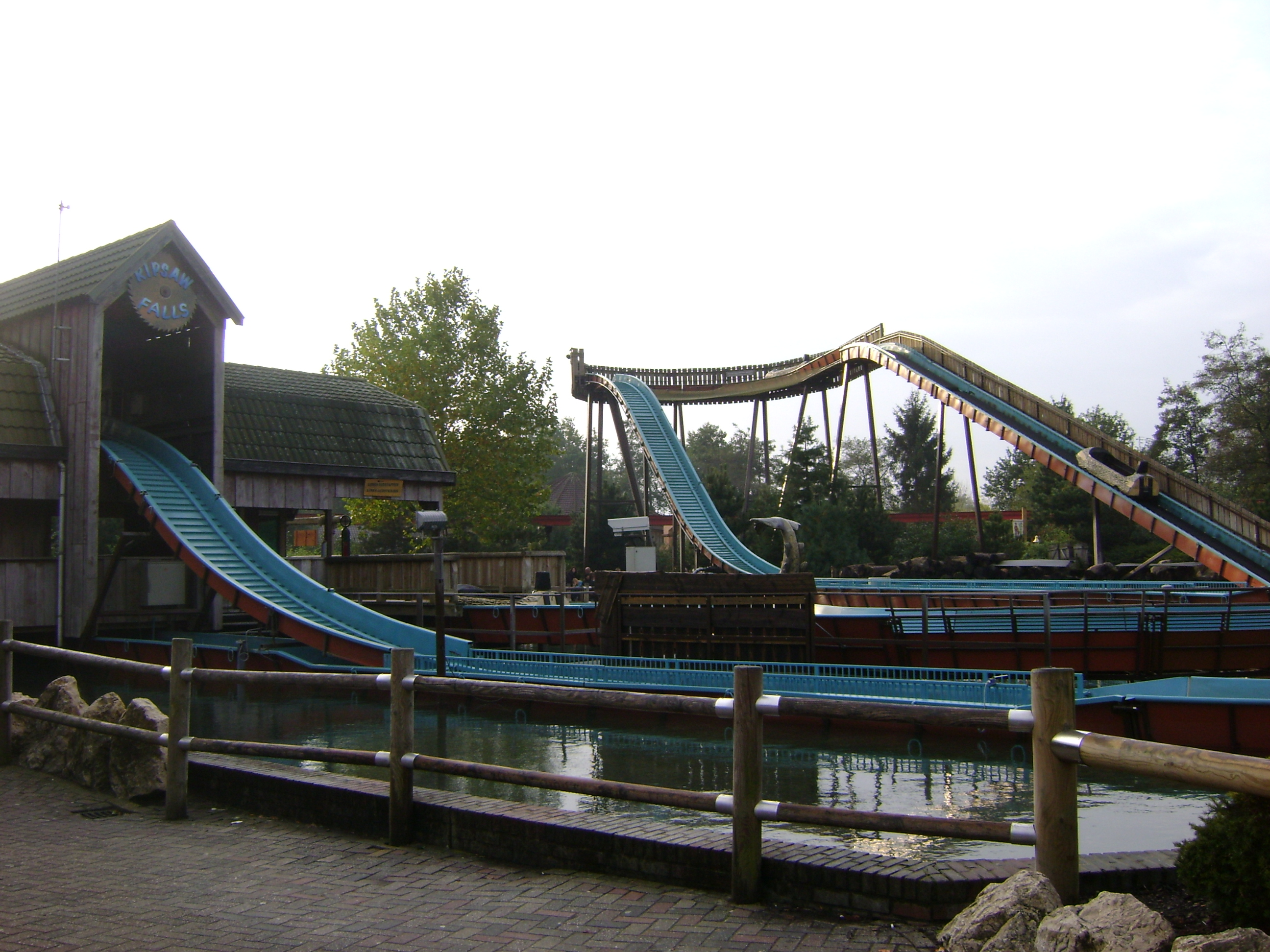
Ripsaw Falls

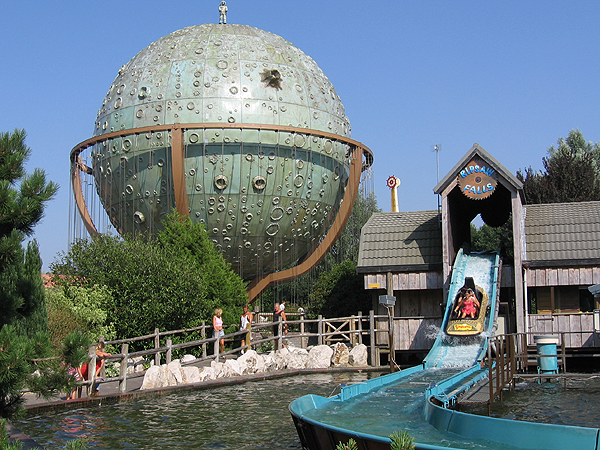
Apollo

=== Roller coasters ===
- Mine Train
- Thunder Loop (Closed 2 October 2016)
- Gold Rush (Opened 13 April 2017, replacing Thunder Loop)

=== Water rides ===
- Expedition Nautilus
- Ripsaw Falls

=== Other rides ===
- Apollo
- Big Wheel
- Chuck Wagon
- Eagle
- El Teatro
- Enterprise
- Fogg's Trouble
- Free Fall
- Gallopers
- Kabelbaan
- Loggers Slides
- Magic Bikes
- Merry go Mad
- Pioneer Express 63 (Monorail)
- Mountain Slide
- Indian Pony ride
- Jumbo
- Kids Country
- Octopus
- Old Timer
- Passepartout Explorer
- Phileas Fun House
- Pirate
- Sky Tower
- Sky Sifter
- Tomahawk
- Western Village Theater
- Wild West Adventure

== Popular culture ==
Slagharen was featured in the satirical commercial-like clip about Trump called "America first, Netherlands second" by comedian Arjen Lubach. Within weeks, the “ad” generated more than 24 million views on YouTube. In the video, they mention two parks as one: Slagharen and PonyParkCity. The video only shows a few seconds' worth of footage from Slagharen before quickly changing to show the ponies at PonyParkCity.

== See also ==
- Parques Reunidos
