= Nissi Beach =

Beach in the resort of Ayia Napa, Cyprus

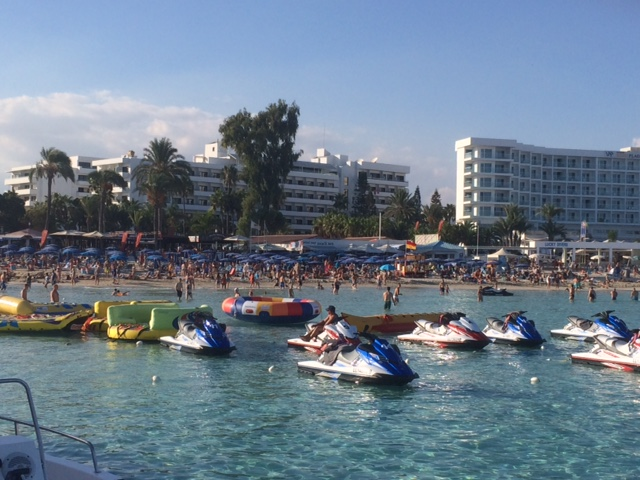
- Nissi Beach, October 2017

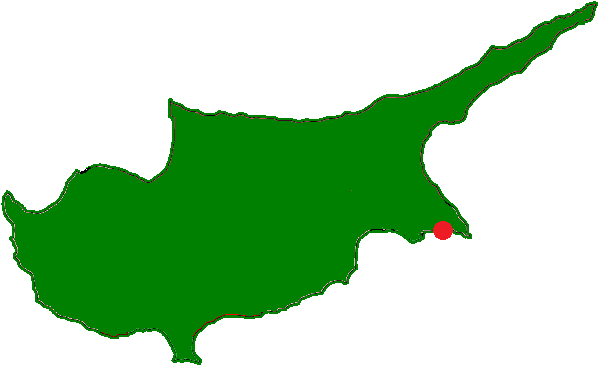

- Location within Cyprus
- Coordinates: 34.988°N 33.969°E
- Ocean/sea sources: Mediterranean Sea
- Basin countries: Cyprus

Nissi Beach is a popular beach in the resort of Ayia Napa, Cyprus.

The beach stretches for 500 metres and the water is clean enough for the beach to have been awarded the blue flag designation. The beach, which runs the length of its own cove, takes its name from the small islet of Nissi (Greek: Νησί) located close to the coast. The uninhabited islet can be easily reached on foot through the shallow waters and its location provides a good shelter for the rest of the beach. The islet is covered with low-level local vegetation.

Nissi Beach has become a popular destination for clubbers following live programs transmitted through BBC's Radio 1 Roadshow during the summer tourist season since 2002. Nissi Bay Beach Bar is very popular with locals and tourists alike, playing music throughout the day and organizing events such as foam parties and catwalks with guest DJs. Water sports such as water-skiing and windsurfing are available. There are also two beach volleyball courts open to the public.

In 2005, archaeological excavations along the western borders of the bay revealed evidence of fire-lighting equipment dating back 12,000 years, indicating that the area could have been settled by the first humans on the island.

== Gallery ==
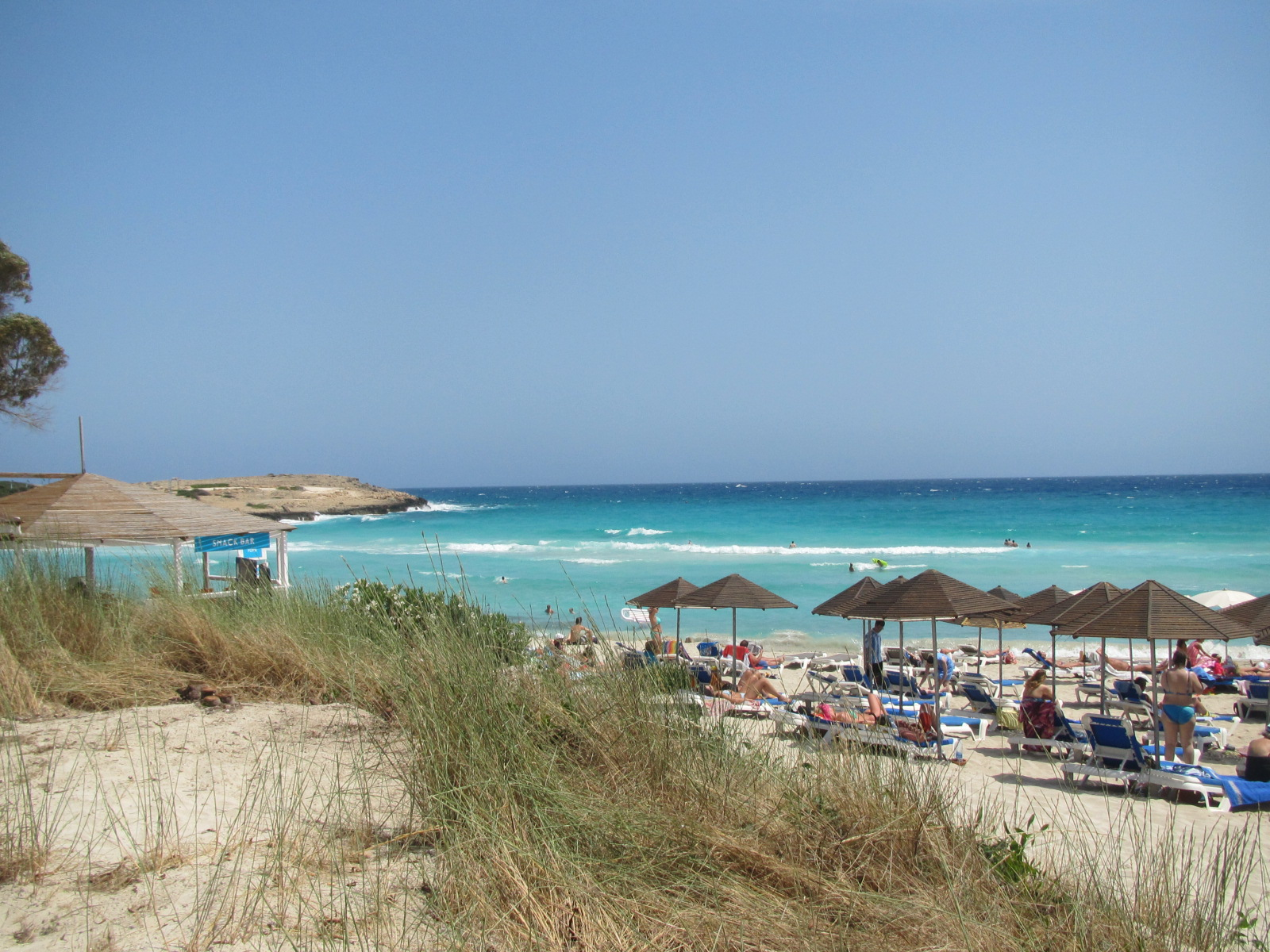
Nissi Beach in May 2012

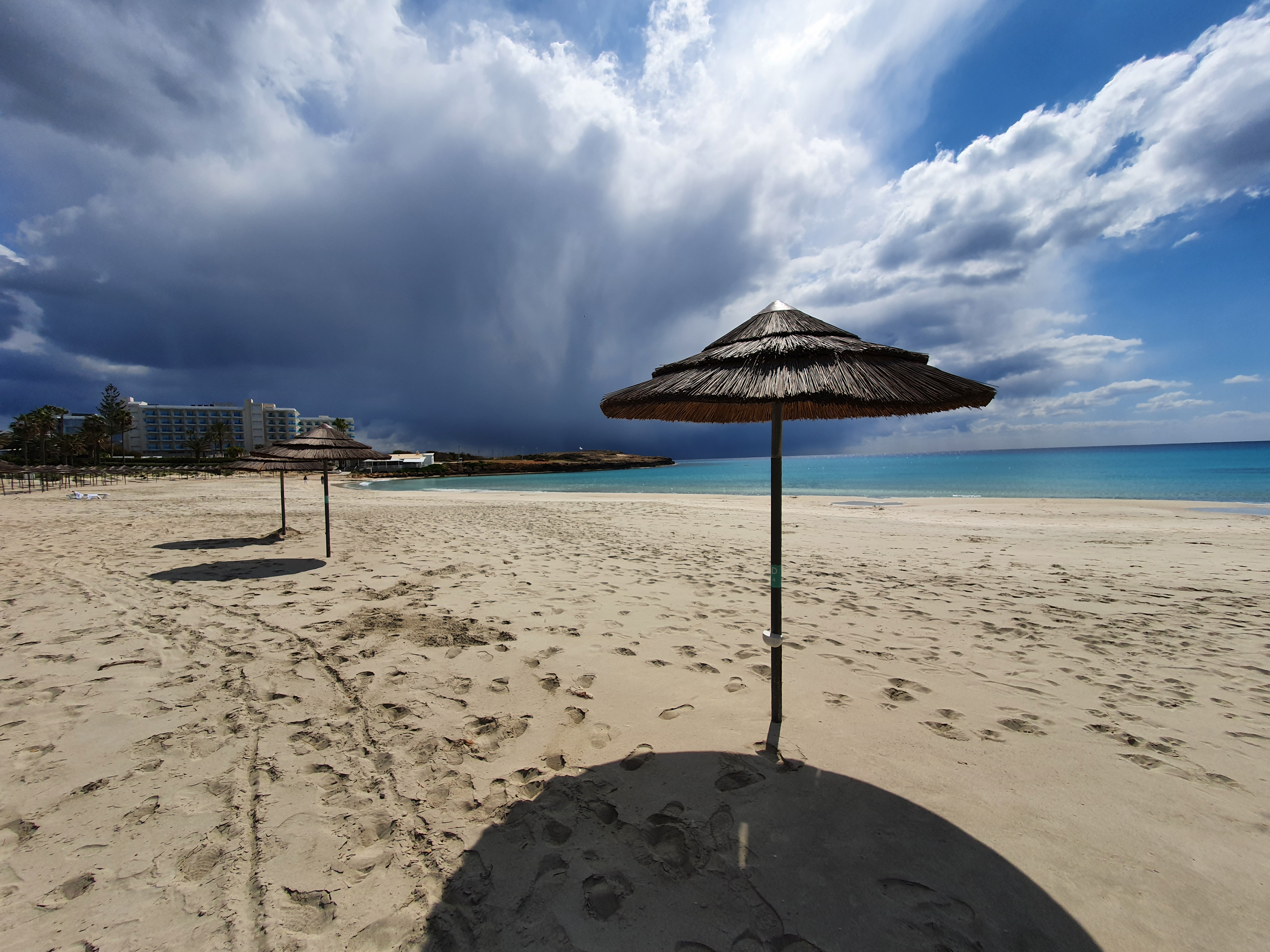
Nissi Beach in March 2022

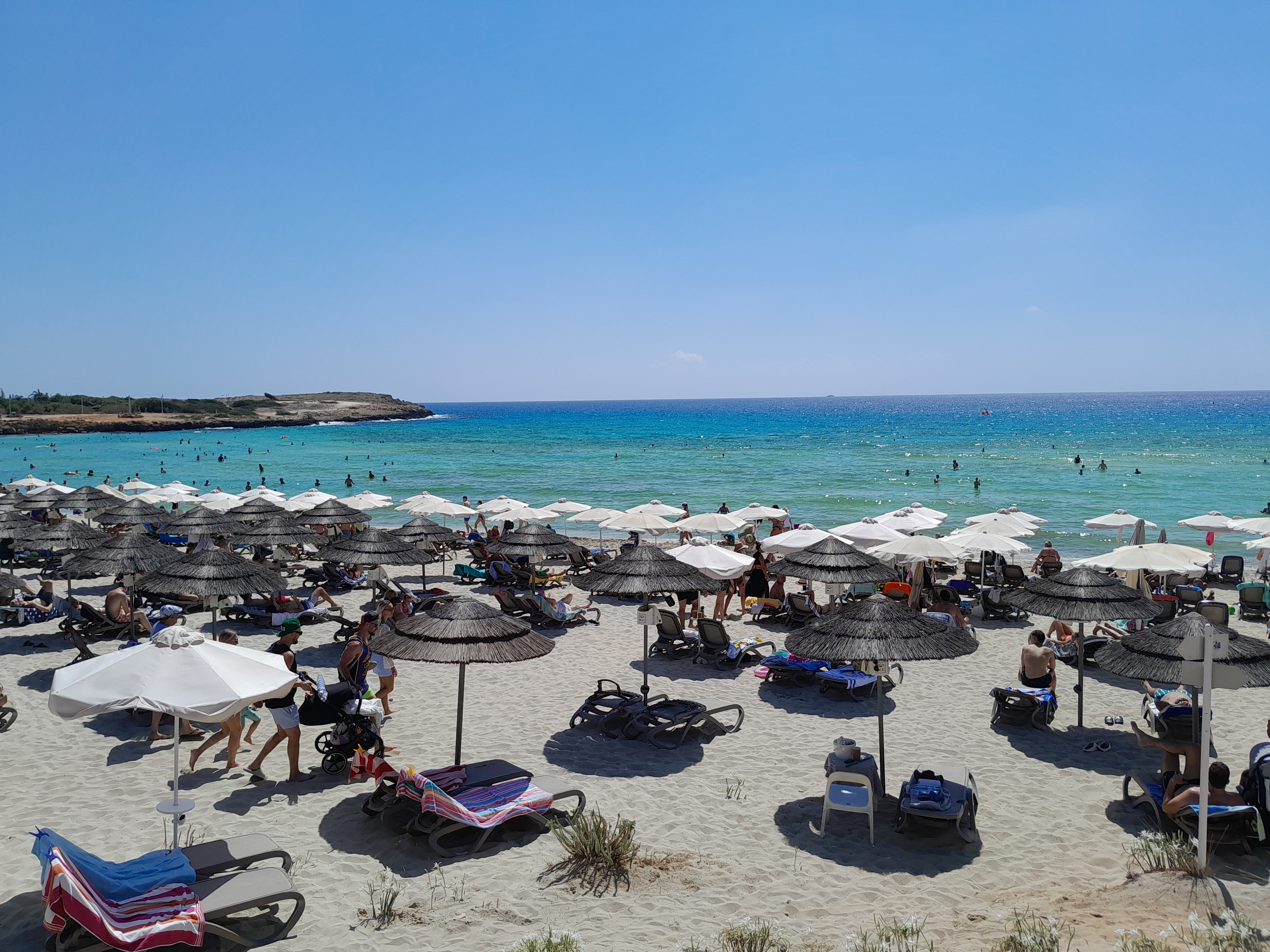
Nissi Beach in September 2025
