= Parko Paliatso =

Amusement park in Cyprus

Parko Paliatso Luna Park
- Interactive map of Parko Paliatso Luna Park
- Location: Ayia Napa, Cyprus
- Coordinates: 34.98555°N 33.99769°E
- Status: Operating
- Opened: August 1999
- Owner: Vali Amusements Ltd.
- Slogan: Enjoy the ride!
- Operating season: April to October
- Area: 7.41 acres (3.00 ha)

Attractions
- Total: 25 (2025)
- Roller coasters: 2
- Website: parkopaliatsocy.com

Parko Paliatso Luna Park is an amusement park in Ayia Napa, Cyprus. It is the largest amusement park in Cyprus, built on a 30,000 m^{2} (7.4 acres) land, and is free to enter.

== Overview ==
The park was established in 1999 by Vali Amusements. Due to its central location in Ayia Napa, a parking area is available that can host up to 300 cars. During Christmas holidays, Paramythoupoli and Christmas Land operate between November and January. The first one takes place in Nicosia and the second one in Limassol. Parko Paliatso is usually closed between late October and early April, though its indoor playground and restaurant remain open to be hired for birthday parties and other events.

The park has 25 rides and attractions separated into three main categories: extreme, family, and child rides. The biggest and most popular attraction is the 90-metre (300 feet) tall SlingShot, one of the tallest rides in Europe. In 2010, the park acquired a 45-metre (147 feet) tall Giant Wheel. It also offers a variety of amusement arcade games and carnival games (shooting gallery, lucky games, etc.) as well as a Ride the Bull attraction. The park has a 1,000 m^{2} (11,000 sq ft) restaurant, a free playground area, stands selling food, and bars selling drinks.

In 2021, Vali Amusements opened a sister park at Cavo Greco Avenue in Protaras called Protaras Fun Park.

== Rides ==
=== Extreme rides ===
- Break Dance
- SlingShot
- Street Fighter (Rolling Stones 360)
- Booster
- Wild Mouse

=== Family rides ===
- Swing Ride
- Crazy Frog
- Caterpillar Coaster
- Musik Express
- Giant Wheel
- Ghost Train - Fantasma
- Adult Bumper Cars
- 5D Cinema

=== Child rides ===
- Carousel
- Safari Train
- Tea Cups
- Bungee Trampolines
- Kids Paradise
- Paratrooper
- Mini Wheel
- Convoy
- Trampolines
- Bumper Boats
- Motorbikes
- Junior Bumper Cars

== Accidents and incidents ==
On 12 April 2019, a 44-year-old Russian woman and her seven-year-old son were riding the Star Flyer when their swing collided with a metal pole after the ride failed to slow down, reportedly due to an error on the ride operator's part; they were both ejected from their seats and the boy fractured his leg while his mother suffered cuts to her leg, a broken arm, and a concussion. The case was settled out of court in 2021. The ride was removed from the park and allegedly sold to Abie Danter, a company specialising in amusement parks for hire in England.

== Gallery ==
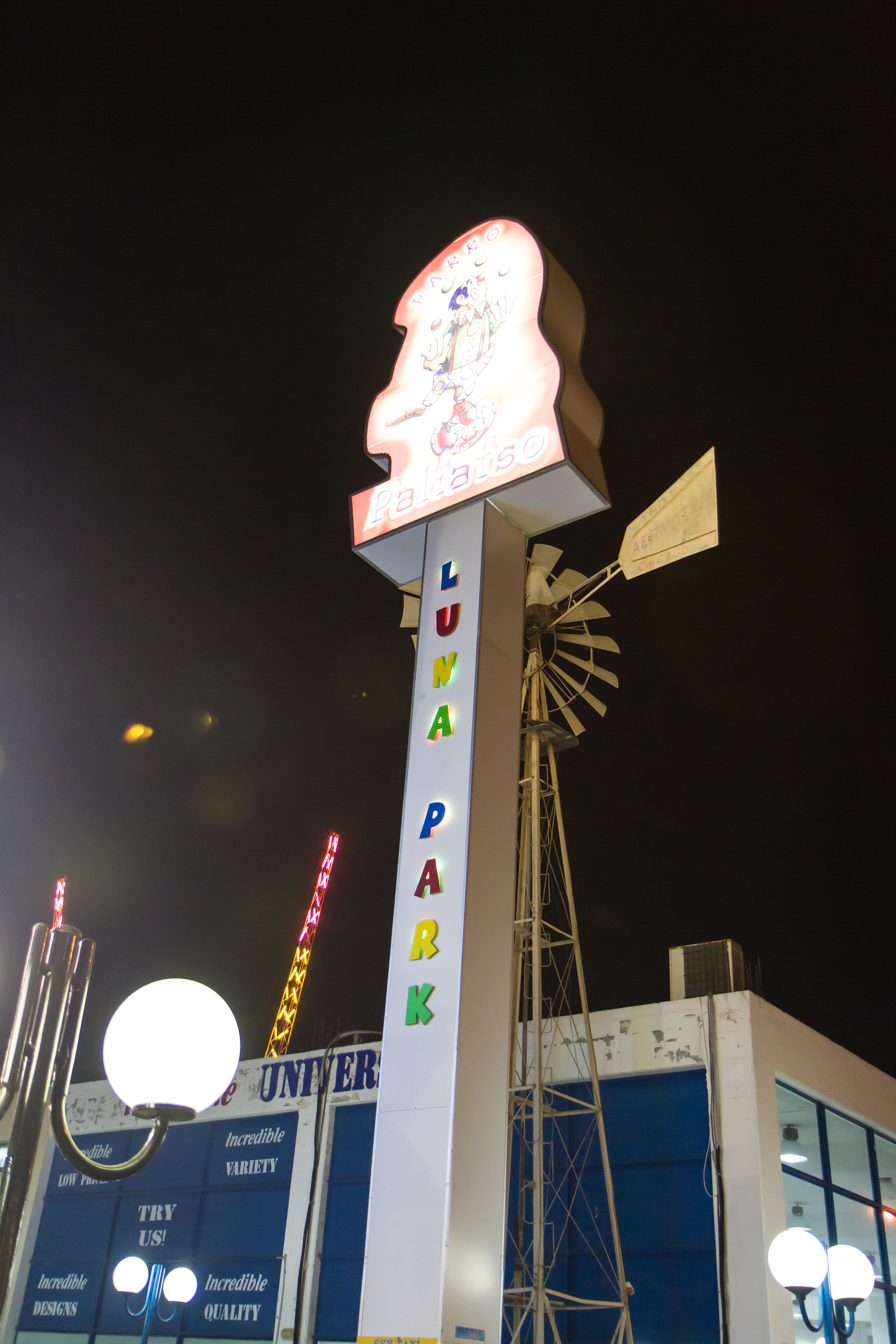
The park's north entrance

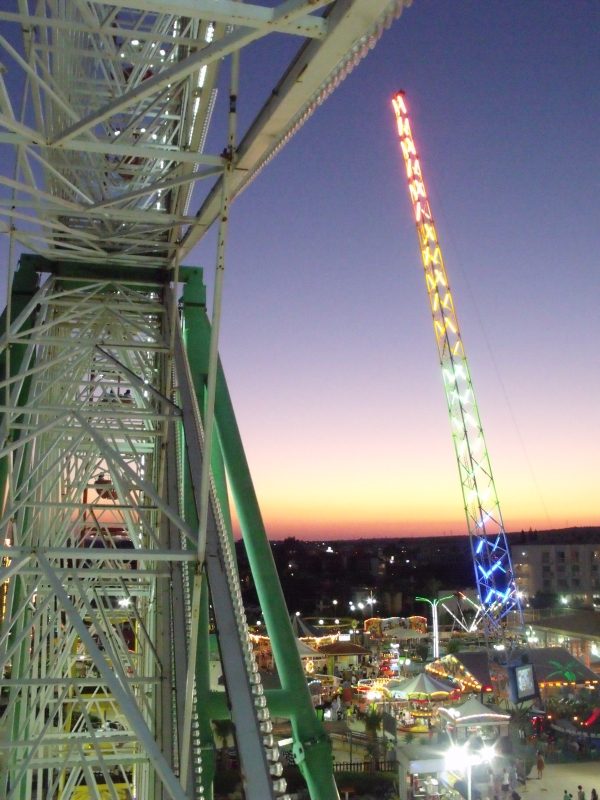
On the giant wheel

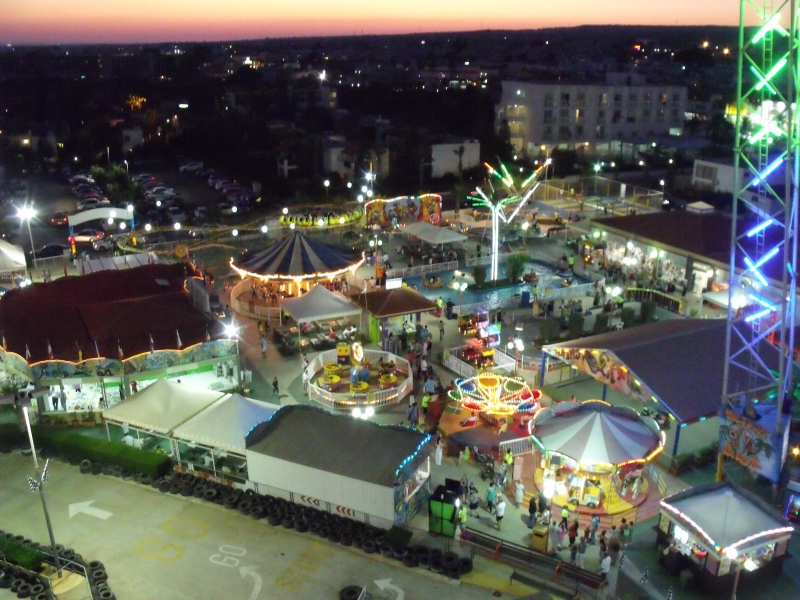
View from the giant wheel

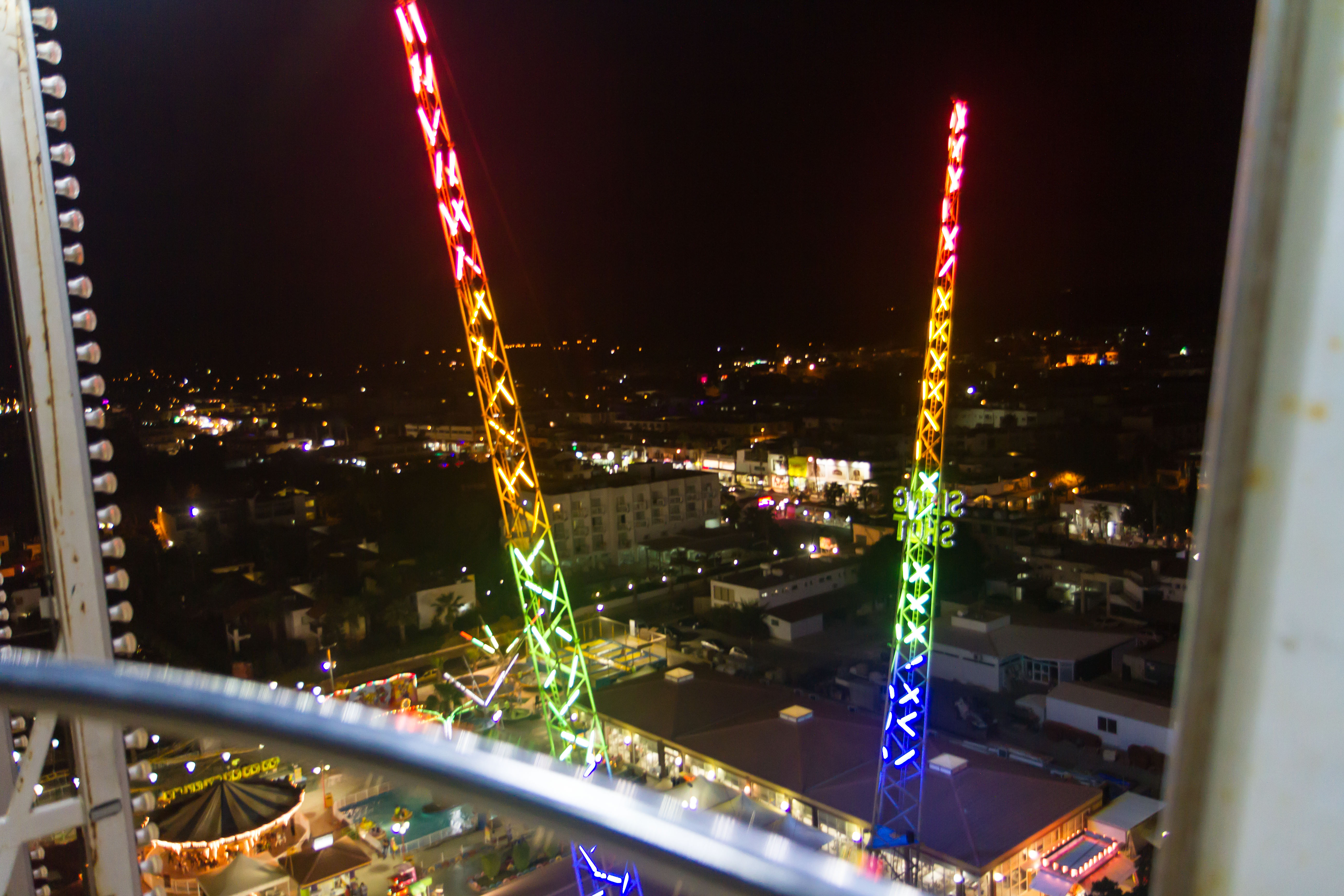
View from the giant wheel

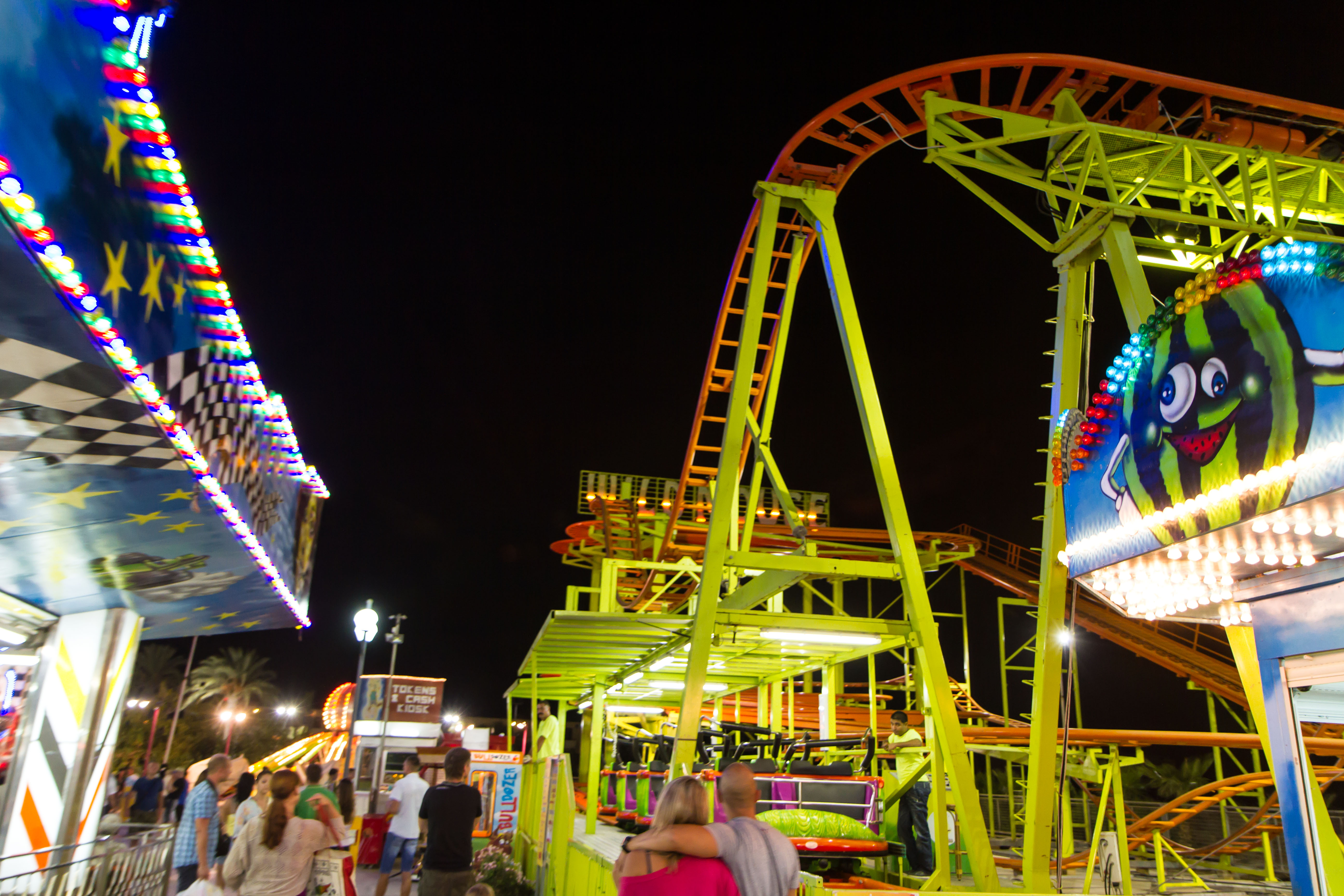
Adult bumper cars on the left and the Wild Mouse on the right

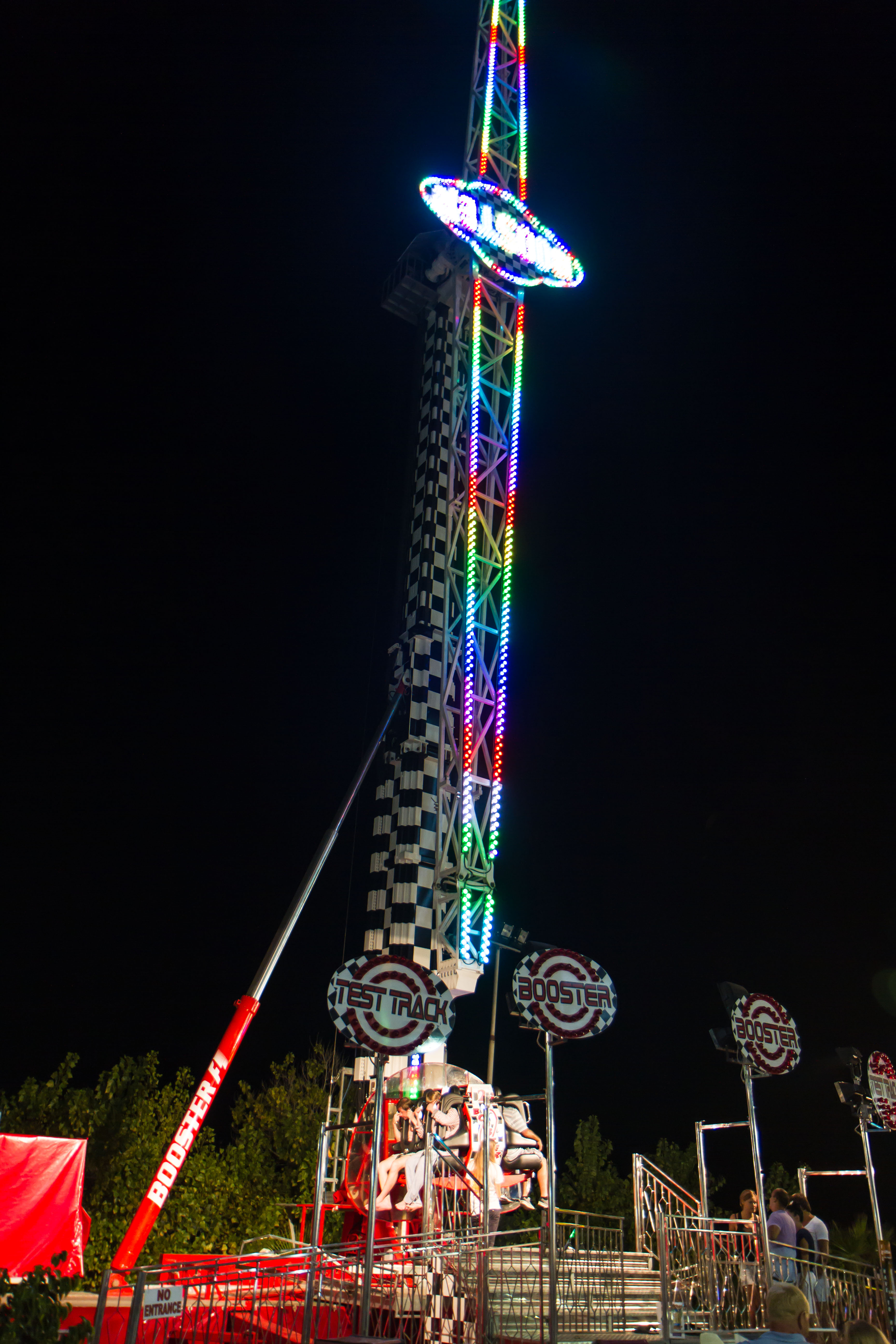
The 45-metre (147 feet) tall Booster

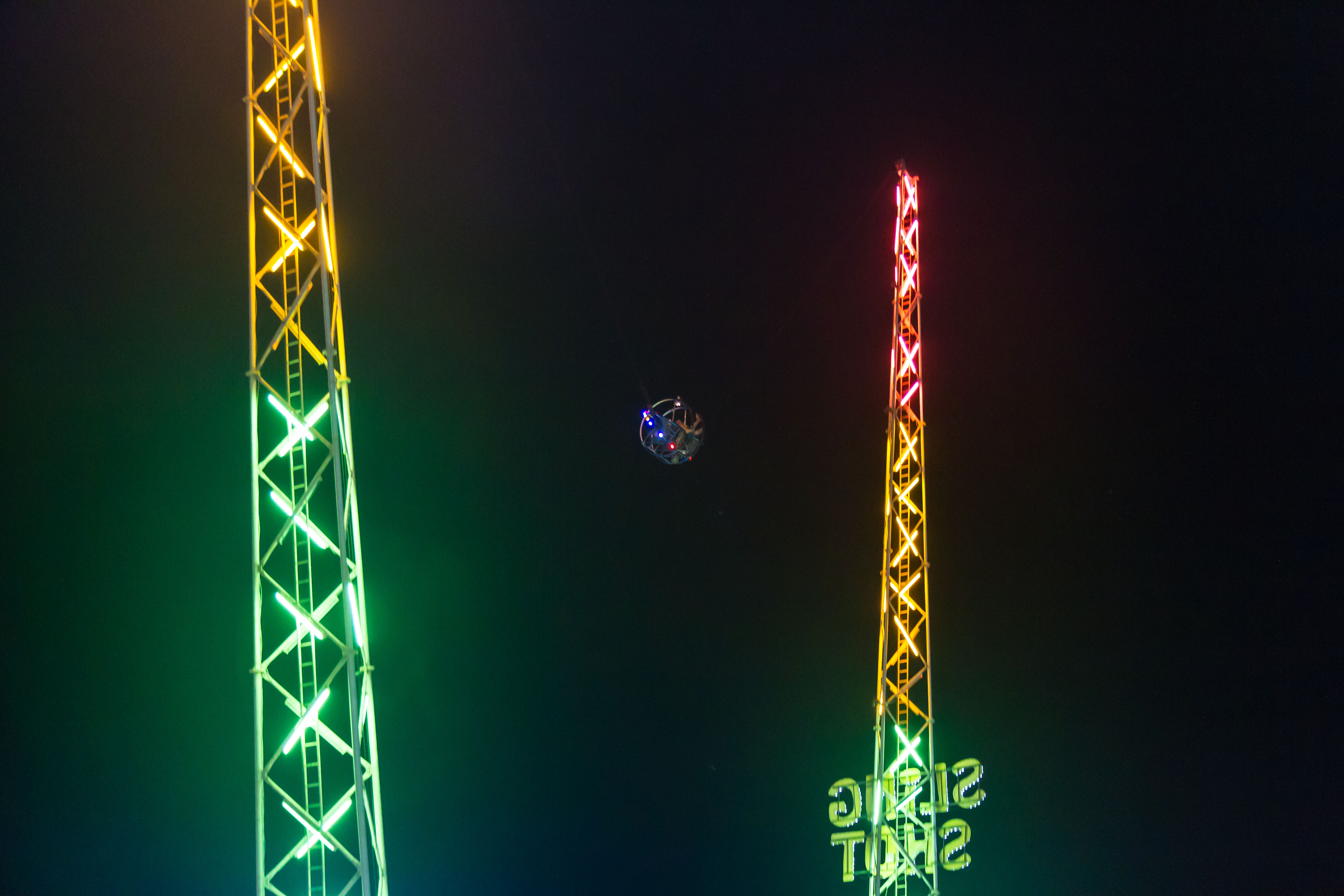
The 90-metre (300 feet) tall SlingShot, one of the tallest rides in Europe

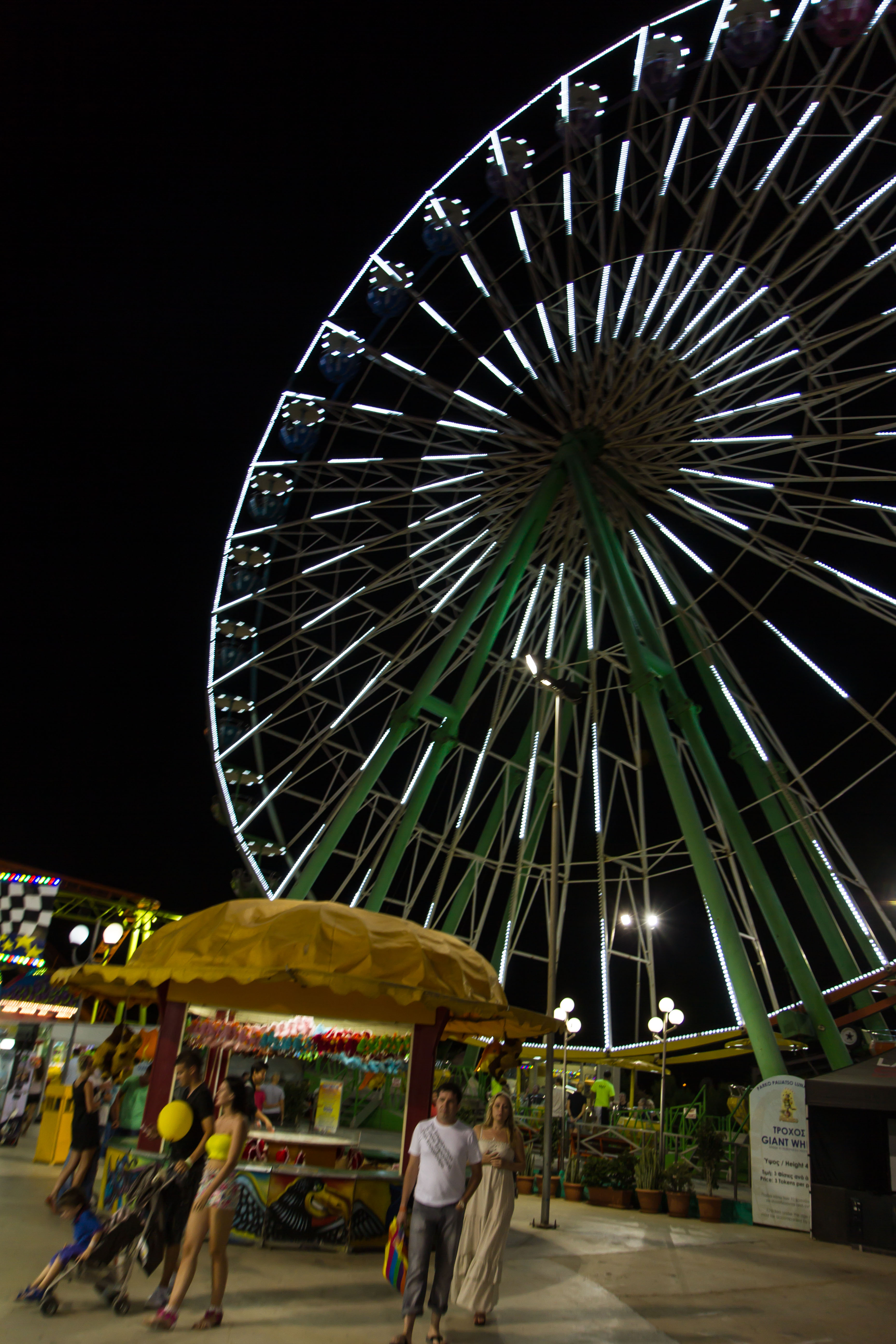
The 45-metre (147 feet) tall giant wheel
